= Aunarius =

Roman Catholic saint and Bishop of Auxerre

Saint Aunarius (Aunacharius)
- Born: c.540
- Died: c.603 Auxerre
- Venerated in: Roman Catholic Church; Eastern Orthodox Church
- Feast: 25 September

Saint Aunarius (Aunacharius) (French: Aunaire, Aunachaire, Anachaire) (c.540 – c. 603 AD) was bishop of Auxerre during the 6th century.

== Life ==
Born in Orleans of noble birth, he was brought up in the royal court of Guntram. His brother Austrenus became Bishop Orleans; his sister, (Saint) Agia was the mother of Lupus, Archbishop of Sens. After making a pilgrimage to Tours, Aunarius decided he wanted to become a priest. Learning of this, Saint Syagrius of Autun undertook his instruction and later ordained him. Eventually Aunarius was made Bishop of Auxerre.

His administration is noted for certain important disciplinary measures that throw light on the religious and moral life of the Merovingian times. He caused solemn litanies to be said daily in the chief centers of population, by rotation, and on the first day of each month in the larger towns and monasteries. He attended the Synod of Paris in 573, and the Synod of Mâcon in 581.

Aware that Aunarius held a degree of influence with the Frankish kings, Pope Pelagius II wrote to him, asking that he persuade the Franks to come to aid of Rome against the Lombards. The Franks did attack the Lombards, but withdrew upon payment of a fee.

He enforced daily attendance at the Divine Office on the part both of regular and secular clergy. He held (in 578 or 585) the Council of Auxerre, an important synod of four bishops, seven abbots, thirty-five priests, and four deacons for the restoration of ecclesiastical discipline and the suppression of non-Christian religious practices. The decrees illustrate the life and manners among the newly-converted Teutonic tribes and the Gallo-Romans of the time.

In 592 he wrote the Institutiones de Rogationibus et Vigiliis. He caused the lives of his predecessors Amator and Germanus to be written.

== Veneration ==
Aunarius was buried at the Abbey of Saint-Germain d'Auxerre. His remains were later enclosed in a golden chest, but were partially dispersed by the Huguenots in 1567. A portion, however, was placed in the hollow pillar of a crypt, and saved.

His feast day is celebrated on 25 September.
