= Council of Auxerre =

The Councils of Auxerre were local church councils held in the Ancient Diocese of Auxerre.

== First Council of Auxerre ==
The first Council of Auxerre was held in 585 (or 578) by St. Annacharius. It formulated forty-five canons, closely related in context to canons of the contemporary Council of Lyon and Third Council of Mâcon.

== Second Council of Auxerre ==
The second Council of Auxerre was presumably the last Frankish council before the 742/3 Concilium Germanicum. Its canons are concerned chiefly with the Divine Office and ecclesiastical ceremonies.
