= Aposiopesis =

Figure of speech: an unfinished sentence

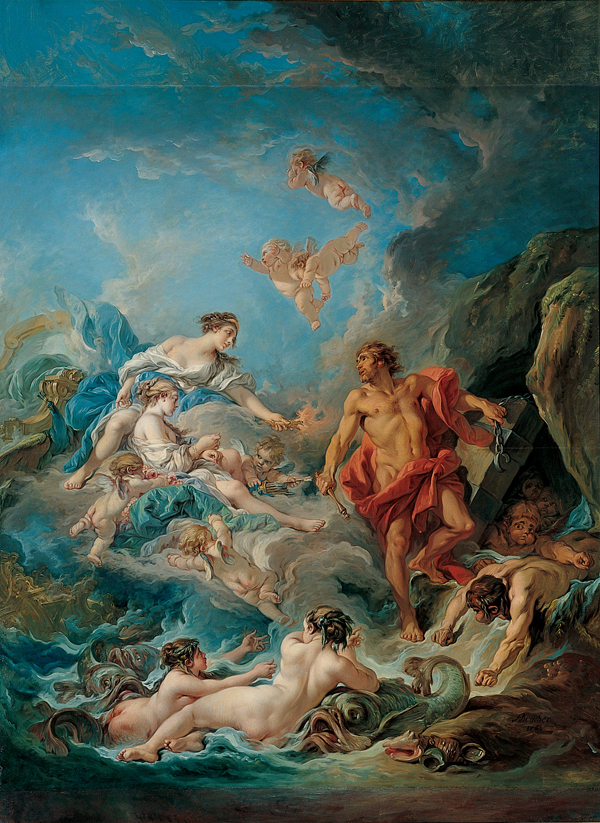
In Virgil's Aeneid, after the events of the above painting by François Boucher— Juno Asking Aelous to Release the Winds— Neptune berates Aeolus aposiopetically, shouting, "You whom, I—! But it is better to settle the agitated waves."

Aposiopesis (/ˌæpəsaɪ.əˈpiːsɪs/; Classical Greek: ἀποσιώπησις, "becoming silent") is a figure of speech wherein a sentence is deliberately broken off and left unfinished, the ending to be supplied by the imagination, giving an impression of unwillingness or inability to continue. An example would be the threat "Get out, or else—!" This device often portrays its users as overcome with passion (fear, anger, excitement) or modesty. To mark the occurrence of aposiopesis with punctuation, an em rule (—) or an ellipsis (…) may be used.

== Rhetorical use ==
Aposiopesis, also known as praecisio, reticentia, obticentia, interruptio, silence, and figure of silence, refers to the sudden termination of a sentence; it may or may not be marked with punctuation.

Most simply, aposiopesis may be used when one is unable to continue speaking. For example, in Shakespeare's Henry IV, Part 1, Henry Percy, about to die, utters:

But thought's the slave of life, and life's time's fool;
And time, that survey of all the world,
Must have a stop. O, I could prophesy,
But that the earthly and cold hand of death
Lies on my tongue: no, Percy, thou art dust
And food for ...

After which he dies, his sentence being ended on account of his inability to speak.

Aposiopesis can also occur when one does not know what to say. For instance, in Shakespeare's King Lear, the eponymous protagonist, lacking an appropriate threat for his mischievous daughters, exclaims:

No, you unnatural hags,
I will have such revenges on you both,
That all the world shall— I will do such things,—
What they are, yet I know not: but they shall be
The terrors of the earth.

Intentional use of aposiopesis can be both logical and emotional: this may encompass purposefully pausing, such as to allow an argument to situate with an audience or to stop oneself from speaking when it would compromise their own position, or because one is too overcome with intense emotion or passion such as fear, wrath, or sadness (though this latter reason may be obligatory, if one is so overcome they literally are unable to speak). In Shakespeare's Julius Caesar, Mark Antony interrupts his own speech and pauses suddenly during it:

O judgment! thou art fled to brutish beasts,
And men have lost their reason. Bear with me,
My heart is in the coffin there with Caesar,
And I must pause till it come back to me.

In this case, Mark Antony is purposefully pausing (citing the reason as being emotional) from speaking for rhetorical effect: this allows him to gauge the audience's reaction and allow his words to puncture the crowd.

Aposiopesis can also be used when the rest of the sentence (especially when it is proverbial) is well-known or well-known, thus one may say "when in Rome" or "speak of the devil," expecting the audience knows the extended meaning ("When in Rome, do as the Romans do" and "Speak of the devil, and he shall appear," respectively).

== Examples ==
- One classical example of aposiopesis in Virgil occurs in Aeneid 1.135. Neptune, the Roman god of the Sea, is angry with the winds, whom Juno released to start a storm and harass the Trojan hero and protagonist Aeneas. Neptune berates the winds for causing a storm without his approval, but breaks himself off mid-threat:

Aeneid 1.132-141
Latin

Iam caelum terramque meō sine nūmine, ventī,
miscēre et tantās audētis tollere mōlēs?
quōs ego—sed mōtōs praestat compōnere flūctūs.

English

Now, winds, you dare to embroil the sky and the earth without my approval,
and raise up such a mass?
You whom, I—! But it is better to settle the agitated waves.

- Another example in Virgil occurs in the Aeneid 2.100. Sinon, the Greek who is posing as a defector to deceive the Trojans into accepting the Trojan Horse within their city wall, tells about how Ulixes lied to spur on the war.

Vergil, Aeneid 2.97-101
Latin

hinc mihi prima malis labes, hinc semper Vlixes
criminibus terrere nouis, hinc spargere uoces
in uulgum ambiguas et quaerere conscius arma.
nec requieuit enim, donec Calchante ministro—
sed quid ego haec autem nequiquam ingrata revoluo?

English

This was the time when the first onslaught of ruin began for me.
Ulixes kept terrifying me with new accusations,
kept spreading ambiguous rumors among the people,
and kept looking for quarrel.
Nor did he in fact ever stop, until with the help of Calchas—
But why should I go through this cruel story in vain?

- For an example from classical Latin theater, this occurs multiple times in one speech in Terence's Adelphoe, lines 159–140. In the play, Demea has two sons. He has given one to his brother Micio to raise. In the following scene, Demea has worked himself up in anger over his brother's laxer parenting style. The following speech provides multiple examples of aposiopesis:

Terence, Adelphoe 135-140
Latin

iam si uerbum unum posthac—
An non credis? repeton quem dedi?
aegrest; alienus non sum; si obsto—em desino.
unum uis curem? curo. et est dis gratia,
quom ita ut uolo esse est; tuos iste ipse sentiet
posterius—nolo in illum grauius dicere.

English

Now, if one single word ever again—
But do you not believe me? Am I asking for my child back, whom I gave?
This troubles me. I am no stranger. If I'm in the way—look, I'm not in the way.
You want me to care for one [child]? I care [for one child]. And, thanks to the gods, he is
one as I want him to be. He, that son of yours, he is going to experience
some day—I don't want to speak harshly against him.

- A biblical example is found in Psalm 27, verse 13. (Note: Other English translations insert extra words, example "I had fainted, unless" (King James Version). Another example is "Yet I am confident that" (New Living Translation). Only the Hebrew conjunction "unless" appears – translators add the extra words to make the phrase appear as a complete thought.) It says: "Unless I had believed I would see the goodness of the Lord in the land of the living …" The implication is that the author does not know what he would have done.
- Aposiopesis also occurs at the agitated climax of Mercutio's "Queen Mab" speech, resulting in a calming intervention by Romeo:

Mercutio. This is the hag, when maids lie on their backs,
That presses them and learns them first to bear,
Making them women of good carriage:
This is she—
Romeo. Peace, peace, Mercutio, peace!
Thou talk'st of nothing. (Shakespeare, Romeo and Juliet, I.iv)

- Dante Alighieri used an Aposiopesis in his Divine Comedy, Hell IX, 7-9 (citation from the translation by Henry Wadsworth Longfellow) (Virgil speaks to himself):

“Still it behoveth us to win the fight,”
Began he; “else . . . Such offered us herself . . .
O how I long that some one here arrive!”

== Grammatical definition ==
In syntax, an aposiopesis arises when the "if" clause (antecedent ) of a condition is stated without an ensuing "then" clause, (consequent). Because a consequent implies the trailing off of thought, it is never directly followed by a period, which would effectively result in four consecutive dots. For example, the sentence "If you don't clean your room ..." provides the antecedent but replaces the consequent (for example, "then, you can't go out tonight!").

== See also ==
- Anacoluthon
- Anapodoton
- Ellipsis (linguistics)
- Prosiopesis
- Quos ego
- Figure of speech
- Non sequitur (literary device)
