= Jespersen's cycle =

Linguistic process

An illustration of Jespersen's cycle in French

Jespersen's cycle is a series of processes in the historical development of the expression of negation in a variety of languages, from a simple pre-verbal marker of negation, to a discontinuous marker (elements both before and after the verb) and in some cases to subsequent loss of the original pre-verbal marker. The pattern was formulated in Otto Jespersen's 1917 book Negation in English and Other Languages, and named after him in 1979.

== General description ==
The linguist Otto Jespersen began his book Negation in English and Other Languages (1917):

The history of negative expressions in various languages makes us witness the following curious fluctuation: the original negative adverb is first weakened, then found insufficient and therefore strengthened, generally through some additional word, and this in turn may be felt as the negative proper and may then in the course of time be subject to the same development as the original word.

He elaborated somewhat in The Philosophy of Grammar (1924):

The general history of negative expressions in some of the best-known languages presents a curious fluctuation. The negative adverb is often weakly stressed, because some other word in the sentence has to receive a strong stress of contrast. But when the negative has become a mere proclitic syllable or even a single sound, it is felt to be too weak, and has to be strengthened by some additional word, and this in its turn may come to be felt as the negative proper, which then may be subject to the same development as the original word. We have thus a constant interplay of weakening and strengthening, which with the further tendency to place the negative in the beginning of the sentence where it is likely to be dropped (though prosiopesis) leads to curious results, . . .

The process has since been described for many languages in many different families, and is particularly noticeable in languages which are currently at stage II (as described below) such as French, Welsh, and some dialects of Arabic and Berber.

The fact that different languages can be seen to be in different stages of the process, and that sometimes, as Jespersen says, the whole process can begin again after renewal, prompted the Swedish linguist Östen Dahl, writing in his 1979 article "Typology of sentence negation", to name the process "Jespersen's cycle". The observation widely attributed to Jespersen was however made earlier, most notably by Antoine Meillet, who in 1912 wrote in the context of diachronic change in some Indo-European languages of the expression of negation:

Languages thus follow a kind of spiral development: they add accessory words to obtain an intense expression; these words weaken, are reduced and fall to the level of mere grammatical tools; new words are added, or different words are added for the sake of expression; the weakening starts again, and so on without end. (Note: This is a translation by Olli O. Silvennoinen from Meillet's French: Les langues suivent ainsi une sorte de développement en spirale: elles ajoutent des mots accessoires pour obtenir une expression intense; ces mots s’affaiblissent, se dégradent et tombent au niveau de simples outils grammaticaux; on ajoute de nouveaux mots ou des mots différents en vue de l’expression; l’affaiblissement recommence, et ainsi sans fin.)

(The term Jespersen's cycle has recently been used with reference beyond negation; (Note: "[The term can refer] to any process of grammaticalisation, during which an independent lexical item gradually acquires a secondary grammatical meaning and function, and is consequently subject to a morpho-phonological weakening [resulting in] a clitic, an affix or even a phonologically null element.") this article does not consider such uses.)

== Reason ==
Jespersen explained the causation of these changes. In summary:

The negative adverb very often is rather weakly stressed, because some other word in the same sentence receives the strong stress of contrast – the chief use of a negative sentence being to contradict and to point a contrast. The negative notion, which is logically very important, is thus made to be accentually subordinate to some other notion; and as this happens constantly, the negative gradually becomes a mere proclitic syllable (or even less than a syllable) prefixed to some other word. The incongruity between the notional importance and the formal insignificance of the negative (often, perhaps, even the fear of the hearer failing to perceive it) may then cause the speaker to add something to make the sense perfectly clear to the hearer.

=== Pull chain and push chain ===
Already widely used for describing phonological change over time (especially that of the Great Vowel Shift), the terms "pull chain" and "push chain" have also been applied to Jespersen's cycle.

Jespersen's own early description of the first transition in the process was of "the original negative adverb [being] first weakened, then found insufficient and therefore strengthened". Such a process of weakening prompting reinforcement has been called pull-chain; its reverse, a process of reinforcement prompting weakening, push-chain.

Rebecca Posner has pointed out that Jespersen's pull-chain explanation is inadequate: "The insubstantiality of ne in French cannot in itself account for its elision, for in many South Central Italian dialects the preverbal marker is equally as slight, without showing any signs of disappearing or of requiring supplementation". Alternative pull-chain explanations have been offered by Posner herself and Werner Abraham.

Push-chain explanations have been offered by Kate Burridge, Stefan Frisch, Ulrich Detges, and Richard Waltereit.

David Willis distinguishes between stage IIa, "with an obligatory preverbal negator and an optional emphasiser"; and stage IIb, "where the postverbal element has become compulsory". Breitbarth argues that in stage IIb the preverbal element is no longer a negator (either individually or jointly) but instead is merely a polarity marker (an "exponent of affective polarity"); the simultaneous reanalysis constituting the switch from IIa to IIb has her call the chain "hybrid".

== Examples ==
Elly van Gelderen finds evidence that either (or sometimes both) of two distinct syntactic processes that generate a move along a negative cycle have operated, or operate, in Indo-European (Old Norse and Modern Scandinavian), Uralic (Northern Sámi, Finnish, Kamassian); Athabaskan (Navajo, Ahtna, Koyukon, Upper Tanana, Lower Tanana, Chipewyan); Eyak; Tlingit; Haida); Afro-Asiatic (Berber languages, Arabic, Amharic); Omotic (Koorete); Cushitic (Somali, Beja); Chadic (Hausa); and Chinese (including Cantonese and Taiwanese). In a little more detail:

=== French ===
As a "somewhat oversimplified" (Note: Jespersen himself describes the transition of the expression of negation from Latin to the colloquial French of his day as having occurred in five stages: the first, exemplified by ne dico ('do not say'); this expression strengthened by oenum ('one thing'), which, shortened, resulted in the second stage, non dico; in Old French non becoming nen and thence ne for the third stage, jeo ne di; the addition of postverbal mie ('crumb'), point ('point'), pas ('step'), jamais ('ever'), plus ('more'), aucun ('any'), personne ('person'), rien ('thing'), or guère ('much') for the fourth stage, e.g. je ne/n' dis pas; and ne/n' disappearing for the fifth stage, je dis pas.) example from French, there are three stages, labelled I, II and III:

In Stage I, "Negation is expressed by a single preverbal element":

jeo ne dis.
I NEG say
'I do not say'

In Stage II, "Both a preverbal and a postverbal element become obligatory":

je ne dis pas.
I NEG say NEG
'I do not say'

In Stage III, "The original preverbal element becomes optional or is lost altogether":

je dis pas.
I say NEG
'I do not say'

The use of ne on its own survives in certain set expressions (e.g. n'importe quoi 'no matter what/anything') and with certain verbs (e.g. Elle ne cesse de parler 'She doesn't stop talking').

=== Brazilian Portuguese ===
Spoken Brazilian Portuguese is also in differing stages of Jespersen's cycle, depending on register and dialect. The original way to form a negative, as in most Romance languages, was the negative adverb não, as in Maria não viu o acidente 'Maria did not see the accident'. This pre-verbal não is usually pronounced in a reduced form, which led to another não being used where negative adverbs usually go: Maria não viu o acidente não (IPA: /maˈɾiɐ nũ viʊ̯ u asiˈdẽt͡ʃi nɐ̃ʊ̯̃/). These days, sentences without the initial reduced não can be encountered in colloquial varieties: Maria viu o acidente não.

=== Italic languages ===
Italian and the various Italian regional languages are also undergoing a similar transformation, where all three stages can be seen in action at once: The standard language is generally at stage I, with e.g. Non gliel'ho detto 'I haven't told him/her', and this form is also customary in colloquial language. Especially in North-Western variants, this can become Non gliel'ho mica detto colloquially, however with a slight difference with respect to pragmatics (stage II), and further be reduced to (stage III) Gliel'ho mica detto (sub-standard and only regionally in some varieties) or Mica gliel'ho detto (colloquial, more widespread, but with identical meaning as stage II), which already presents the form of a stage I in a new Jespersen's cycle. The word mica originally means '(pieces of) soft inside of bread' or 'crumb', similarly to more standard mollica; it then grammaticalised in the meaning 'a little, (in) the least'. It is part of a series of words used in various registers, dialects and time periods in this same context, e.g. punto 'point' or passo '(small) step' (like in French), or also affatto, originally 'in fact, at all', now generally perceived with a negative valence: Non gliel'ho punto detto, Non gliel'ho passo detto, Non gliel'ho detto affatto. In Western Lombard, the archaic no l'hoo vist 'I haven't seen him/it' has long since become l'hoo minga vist or l'hoo vist no with no change in meaning (where minga ≡ it. mica).

=== English ===
English passed through Jespersen's cycle early in its history. Jespersen's own example is of the process leading to I don't say. The first stage was Old English ic ne secge with emphasis optionally added via na, nalles, and noht, the last of which led to the second stage, Middle English I ne seye not. The third, I say not, was reached in the 15th century. What Jespersen calls "the universal tendency to have the subject before the verb (that is, the verb that means something)" (Note: As such a "universal" is contradicted even by the examples he has just given from Old Norse, Jespersen here presumably means "universal for English".) prompted wide use by the Elizabethans of do, leading to the fourth stage, I do not say; and from there we get the fifth, I don't say.

Or more simply, "I didn't see" would be expressed in Old English as ic ne geseah; then strengthened with the word nauȝt (from Old English nawiht 'no thing') as Middle English I ne ysauȝ nauȝt; then leading to Early Modern English I saw not.

Phillip Wallage has used the Penn-Helsinki Parsed Corpus of Middle English to see the relative frequencies of ne (by itself), the combination of ne and not, and not (by itself), used for sentential negation (and excluding complex examples), in each of four periods spanning 1150 to 1500. From 1150 to 1250 ne (alone) accounted for 60.5% of examples; from 1250 to 1350 the combination of ne and not for 67.7%; from 1350 to 1420 and from 1420 to 1500 not (alone) for 87.5% and 98.2% respectively. Although Wallage finds "no reasons to suppose that ne is either categorially different or occupies a different position within clause structure at stages one and two", he finds evidence for "a morphosyntactic change, involving the innovation of a feature-checking dependency between ne and not at stage two".

=== Scandinavian languages ===
For an expression meaning 'Haraldr does not know', Old Norse had Haraldr ne veit, with ne as the sole negator. The negation was later emphasized by the addition of at or a; using the former, for either Haraldr ne veit-at or ne veit-at Haraldr. For poetry, prosiopesis (clipping of the start) changed the latter to veit-at Haraldr. For prose, the descendants of Old Norse instead used cognates of Old Norse eigi or ekki; so for example Danish came to use ej (now archaic) or ikke, and Swedish to use icke or inte.

=== German and Dutch ===
In Old High German, (Note: Note that the timespans denoted by "Old", "Middle" and "Modern" vary considerably even among languages that genetically are related as closely as are High and Low German, Dutch, and English.) the negator was ni; in Middle High German, nieht or some alternative was added; but by as early as 1300, "sentential negation was mainly expressed either by niht or by an n-indefinite".

In Old Saxon (Old Low German), the negator was ne; in Middle Low German, an or some alternative was added; ne dropped out from the language between 1450 and 1500.

In Old Dutch (Old Low Franconian) too, the negator was ne; in Middle Dutch, nyet or some alternative was added. It was not until as late as 1600 or so that ne disappeared from the language.

=== Greek ===
Paul Kiparsky and Cleo Condoravdi find that negation in Greek has in some structural aspects been stable for three thousand years: it has had two types, emphatic and plain, both bipartite. The authors ask why the negators are always paired, why lexical replacement here is so frequent, and how these two phenomena can be compatible; to which they respond that "the semantic grounding of the process known as Jespersen's cycle" explains all. For emphatic negation, Greek has used either a minimizer, a word or expression corresponding to 'a drop', 'a twig', or similar, and thereby intensifying quantitatively ('not even something as trivial as ...'), or a generalizer, one corresponding to 'nobody whatever', or similar, and thereby intensifying qualitatively, "extending its scope to include everything in that maximal sortal domain". Minimizers and generalizers may be either nominal or adverbial; over time they develop semantically: minimal piece > minimal quantity > minimal degree; and "every plain negation of Greek was once an emphatic negation, at least in so far as its origin can be determined". The reason for this is overuse of the emphatic intensifier: as it becomes near-obligatory over time, it loses its effect.

Although Kiparsky and Condoravdi say that the changes follow the general pattern described by Jespersen, they disagree with him over the mechanism:

The contrast that the chain shift maintains is not that between affirmation and negation, as Jespersen assumes, but the contrast between plain and emphatic negation. And the weakening that undermines the contrast is not phonetic weakening of plain negation, but semantic weakening of emphatic negation. (Note: Emphases are the authors'.)

=== Welsh ===
For negation of finite clauses, Middle Welsh mainly used ny(t) for main clauses and na(t) for embedded clauses. Each went before the verb (and caused phonological change to its initial segment).

Dim, later to become a negator, "seems originally to have been a noun meaning 'thing' ", similarly to rien in French. From the 14th to the 16th century, dim was optional (but uncommon) as a postverbal addition to the preverbal negator, probably serving to emphasize the negation. (It was used in other non-affirmative contexts as well.)

In informal 17th-century Welsh texts, either the combination of ni(d) and ddim or ni(d) by itself could be used for main-clause negation. Evidence from the late 18th century onwards shows negation with ddim alone (without ni(d)), but it is likely that this started earlier in spoken Welsh.

The postverbal word ddim remained optional until around the early 19th century in spoken Welsh. Present-day spoken Welsh expresses main clause negation with postverbal ddim. Literary Welsh is more conservative, retaining preverbal ni(d), optionally adding postverbal ddim.

=== Egyptian ===
The Egyptologist Alan Gardiner wrote as early as 1904 of the historical transformation of pas and point (without any claim of originality for his observation); he noted that the earliest attested use of the Egyptian word

Z7 E9 N35 G1 A2

is "as an emphatic adverb in negative sentences", and that it seems likely that, like pas and point, it thereafter lost its emphatic role; both in Egyptian and in Coptic, such words came to express negation.

=== Palestinian Arabic ===
Palestinian Arabic creates negation through suffixation (e.g. /biʕrafɛʃ/ 'I don't know' lit. 'I know not' which comes from an earlier/alternate form of (/ma biʕrafɛʃ/ 'I don't know' lit. 'not I know not').

=== Central Atlas Tamazight ===
Central Atlas Tamazight, a Berber language spoken principally in Central Morocco, uses a bipartite negative construction (e.g. /uriffiɣ ʃa/ 'he didn't go out' — the bold elements together convey the negative) which apparently was modeled after proximate Arabic varieties.

=== Kanincin ===
Kanincin is "a variety of Ruund (L53 (Note: L53 is the Guthrie code for Ruund among the hundreds of Bantu languages. Kanincin is not mentioned either in: Guthrie, Malcolm (1967). The Classification of the Bantu languages. London: International African Institute – via Internet Archive. Or in: Maho, Jouni Filip (4 June 2009). "The 2nd New Updated Guthrie List = NUGL Online: The online version of the New Updated Guthrie List, a referential classification of the Bantu languages" (PDF). Brill.))", a Bantu language that uses three or perhaps even four negative markers for a single negation.

Lack of historical data for Kanincin precludes a conventionally diachronic study, but the sufficiency of a sole, preverbal negative marker, ki, both in closely related languages and in Kanincin proverbs suggest that ki once sufficed generally for negation in Kanincin.

Negation using both a preverbal negative marker and either one of what appear to be two postverbal negative markers – pend (whose status is unclear; occurring more frequently in general) or ‑pa (with its allomorphs, occurring more frequently in certain kinds of context) – is common in Kanincin.

‑Pa may be followed immediately by a third negative marker, kwend or kwaam.

But it is argued that pend itself is "an accumulation of two negative markers: ‑pa and ‑end".

When occurring with negative marker pa, a third (kwaam or an inflectional variant thereof) may or may not add emphasis; in certain contexts it is obligatory.

The preverbal negative marker ki‑ is omissible other than when it precedes "a class 1 (third person singular) subject concord". (Note: On "class 1" in Kanincin: "Numbers in the glosses refer to noun classes. All nouns are assigned to a class. Adjectives, pronouns and verbs show agreement with a noun through nominal or pronominal concord markers of the corresponding class.")

Ki ... ‑end (other than ki ... ‑pend), now used for emphatic assertion in response to a denial, seems also to have been used for negation. This and other data suggest that the addition of a fourth-place negative marker after p-end, now used for more or less additional emphasis, may lose its emphatic effect and become part of yet another standard expression of negation.

=== Chamic languages ===
The Chamic languages, spoken in parts of Cambodia, Vietnam, and Hainan, may also be undergoing Jespersen's cycle.
