= Quos ego =

Phrase in Virgil's "Aeneid"

Quos ego (Latin, literally 'Whom I') are the words, in Virgil's Aeneid (I, 135), uttered by Neptune, the Roman god of the Sea, in threat to the disobedient and rebellious winds. Virgil's phrase is an example of the figure of speech called aposiopesis.

Neptune is angry with the winds, whom Juno released to start a storm and harass the Trojan hero and protagonist Aeneas. Neptune berates the winds for causing a storm without his approval, but breaks himself off mid-threat:

Iam caelum terramque meō sine nūmine, ventī,
miscēre et tantās audētis tollere mōlēs?
quōs ego— sed mōtōs praestat compōnere flūctūs.

Now, winds, you dare to embroil the sky and the earth without my approval,
and raise up such a mass?
You whom I— But it is better to settle the agitated waves.

== Cultural references ==
Gustave Flaubert likens a teacher's rebuke of misbehaving students to "the Quos ego" in the opening scene of Madame Bovary.

Depictions in art of Neptune threatening the winds include the engraving by Marcantonio Raimondi and paintings by Peter Paul Rubens and Simone Cantarini.
