= Modesty =

Dress or behavior to avoid sexual attraction

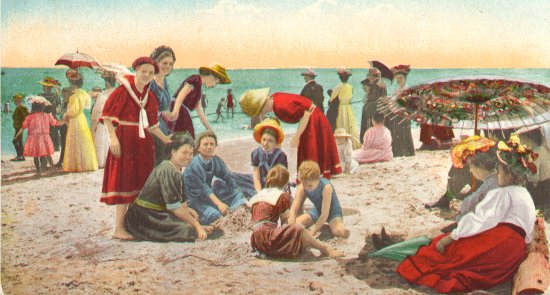
Recreation on a California beach in the first decade of the 20th century, depicting people in modest dress

Modesty, sometimes known as demureness, is a mode of dress and deportment which intends to avoid the encouraging of sexual attraction in others. The word modesty comes from the Latin word modestus which means 'keeping within measure'.

In this use, revealing certain body parts is considered inappropriate, thus immodest. In conservative Middle Eastern societies, modesty may involve women completely covering their bodies with a niqab and not talking to men who are not immediate family members. In Christian Anabaptist and similar sects, it may involve women wearing only ankle-length skirts, blouses up to the collar, and often a small head covering or shawl. In some societies, a one-piece swimsuit may be considered modest while wearing a bikini is not. In most countries, exposure of the body in breach of community standards of modesty, as well as public nudity, is considered indecent exposure and is usually punished by law.

Nudity may be acceptable in public single-sex changing rooms at swimming baths, for example, or for mass medical examinations of military personnel. A person who would never disrobe in the presence of the opposite sex in a social context might unquestioningly do so for a medical examination, while others might allow such examination but only by a person of the same sex.

Overall, standards of modesty vary widely around the world because of sociocultural and contextual differences and particular situations.

In 2023, global spending on modest fashion reached $254 billion, with projections estimating growth to $473 billion by 2025.

== Body ==
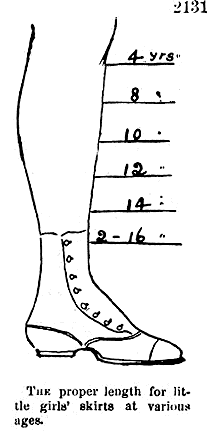
1868 diagram from Harper's Bazaar showing proper girls' skirt lengths increasing as they grow up

Standards of modesty discourage or forbid exposure of parts of the body, varying between societies, which may include areas of skin, the hair, undergarments, and intimate parts. The standards may also require obscuring the shape of the body or parts of it by wearing non-form-fitting clothing. There are also customs regarding the changing of clothes (such as on a beach with no enclosed facilities), and the closing or locking of the door when changing or taking a shower.

Standards of modesty vary by culture or generation and vary depending on who is exposed, which parts of the body are exposed, the duration of the exposure, the context, and other variables. The categories of persons who could see another's body could include:

- a spouse or romantic partner of some sort,
- a friend or family member of the same sex,
- strangers of the same sex.

The context would include matters such as whether it is in one's own home, at another family member's home, at a friend's home, at a semi-public place, at a beach, swimming pool (including whether such venues are considered clothes-optional), changing rooms or other public places. For instance, wearing a bathing suit at the beach would not be considered immodest, while it likely would be in a street or an office. The context may change during specific events or rituals such as Mardi Gras in New Orleans or during neopagan Skyclad work.

Excessive modesty is called prudishness. As a medical condition, it is also called gymnophobia. Excessive immodesty is called exhibitionism.

== In medical settings ==
At times of public or private emergency, expectations of modest dress may be suspended if necessary. This may apply to decontamination after a chemical or biological attack, where removal of contaminated clothing is important, or escaping from a night-time fire without time to dress. For example, during suspected anthrax attacks in 1998 and 2001 in the United States, groups of people had to strip to their underwear in tents set up in parking lots and other public places for hosing down by fire departments. On the other hand, even in an emergency situation, some people are unable to abandon their need to hide their bodies, even at the risk of their life.

== In dress ==
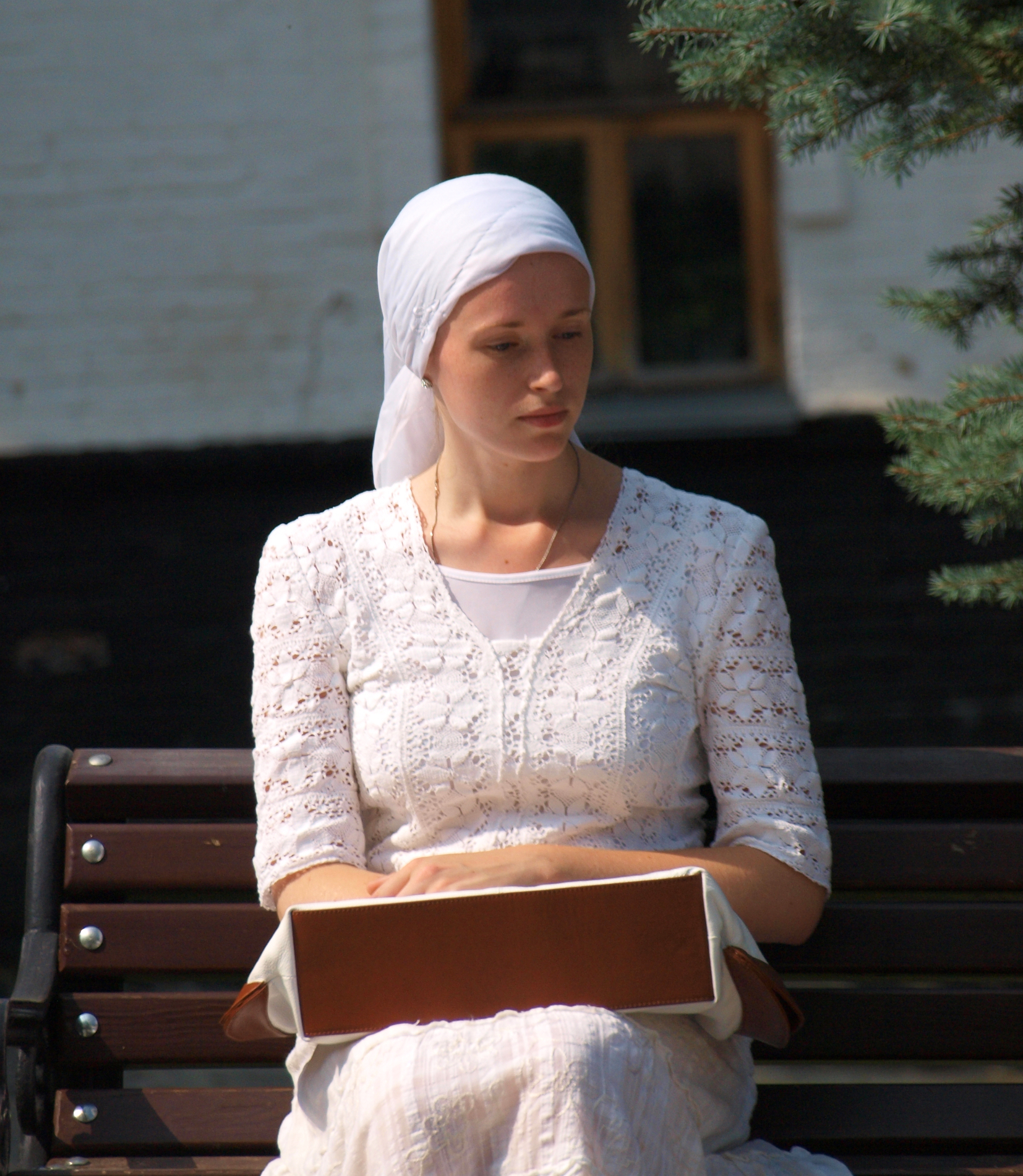
Orthodox pilgrim in the Laure of Kyiv-Perchesk. Pilgrims have to wear modest clothes and women and girls must cover their hair when entering a church or monastery.

Most discussion of modesty involves clothing. The criteria for acceptable modesty and decency have relaxed continuously in much of the world since the nineteenth century, with shorter, form-fitting, and more revealing clothing and swimsuits, more for women than men. Most people wear clothes that they consider not to be unacceptably immodest for their religion, culture, generation, occasion, and the people present. Some wear clothes which they consider immodest, due to exhibitionism, the desire to create an erotic impact, or for publicity.

=== Generally accepted Western norms ===
Appropriate modesty depends on context and place. For example, in single-sex public changing rooms, nudity is often acceptable.

In Western and some other societies, there are differences of opinion as to how much body exposure is acceptable in public. In contemporary Western society, the extent to which a woman may expose cleavage depends on social, cultural and regional context. Women's swimsuits and bikinis commonly may reveal the tops and sides of the breasts, or they may be topless as is common on the beaches of the French Riviera. Displaying cleavage is considered permissible in many settings, and is even a sign of elegance and sophistication on many formal social occasions, but it may be considered inappropriate in settings such as workplaces, churches and schools. Showing the nipples or areolae is almost always considered toplessness or partial nudity. However, in 2014 newly elected Pope Francis drew world-wide commentary when he encouraged mothers to breastfeed in church if their babies were hungry.

In private homes, the standards of modesty apply selectively. For instance, nudity among close family members in the home can take place, especially in the bedroom and bathroom, and wearing of only undergarments in the home is common.

In many cultures it is not acceptable to bare the buttocks in public; deliberately doing so is sometimes intended as an insult. In public, Western standards of decency expect all people to cover their genitalia, and women to cover their breasts.

Since the 1980s it has become more common for young women in Western societies to wear clothing that bared the midriff, "short shorts", backless tops, sheer and other styles considered to be immodest.

In the United States in the early twenty-first century, public breastfeeding has become increasingly acceptable, sometimes protected by law. President Barack Obama's health care bill from 2010 provides additional support to nursing mothers, requiring employers to provide a private and shielded space for employees to use in order to nurse.

=== Gender differences ===
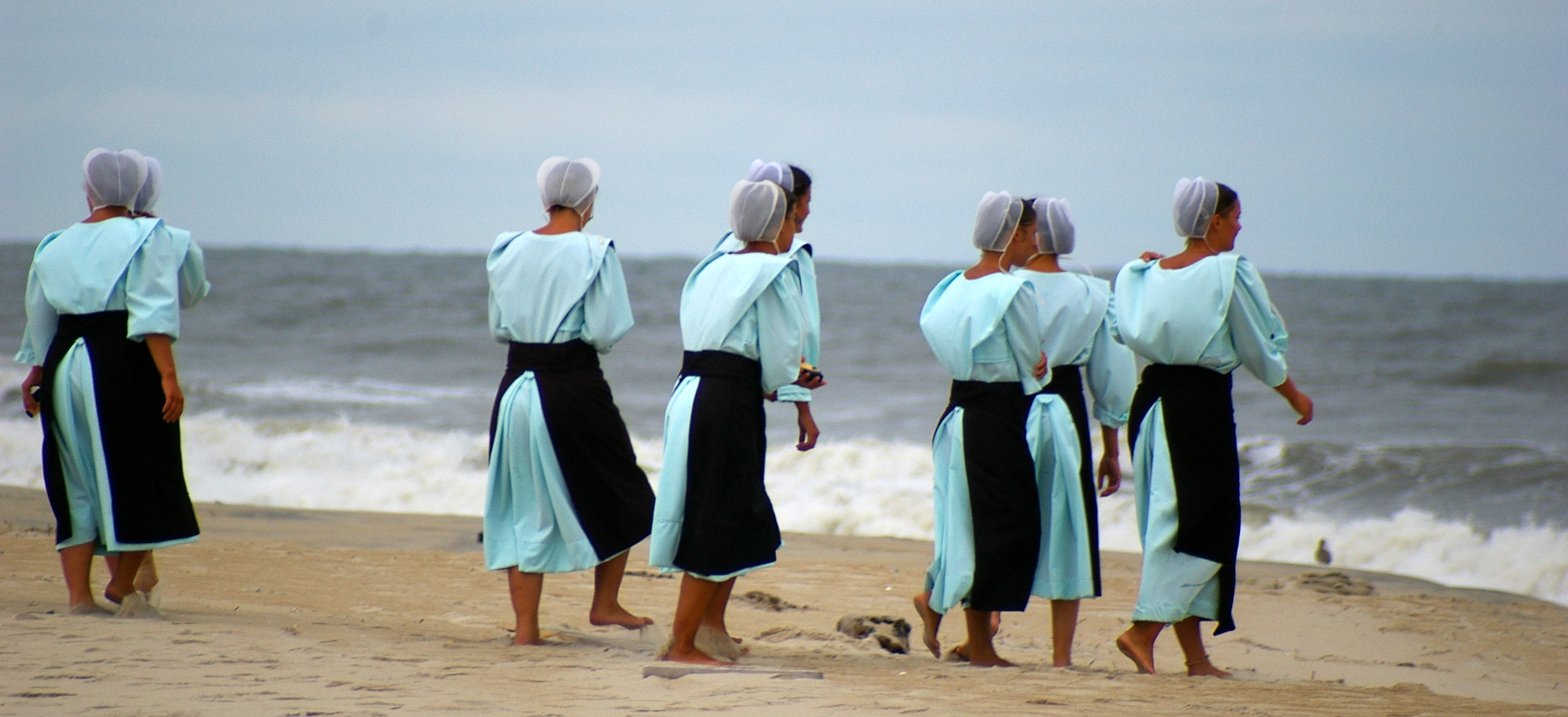
Modesty in dress is a relative cultural concept, even in the West, as seen above in the plain dress of Amish women on an American beach in 2007.

Men and women are subject to different standards of modesty in dress. While both men and women, in Western culture, are generally expected to keep their genitals covered at all times, women are also expected to keep their breasts covered. Some body parts are normally more exposed by women than men—e.g., the midriff and the upper part of the back.

In 1992 New York State's highest court accepted Fourteenth Amendment to the United States Constitution arguments and struck down the provision in New York's Exposure of the Person statute that made it illegal for women to bare their chests where men were permitted to do so.

== Religious traditions ==
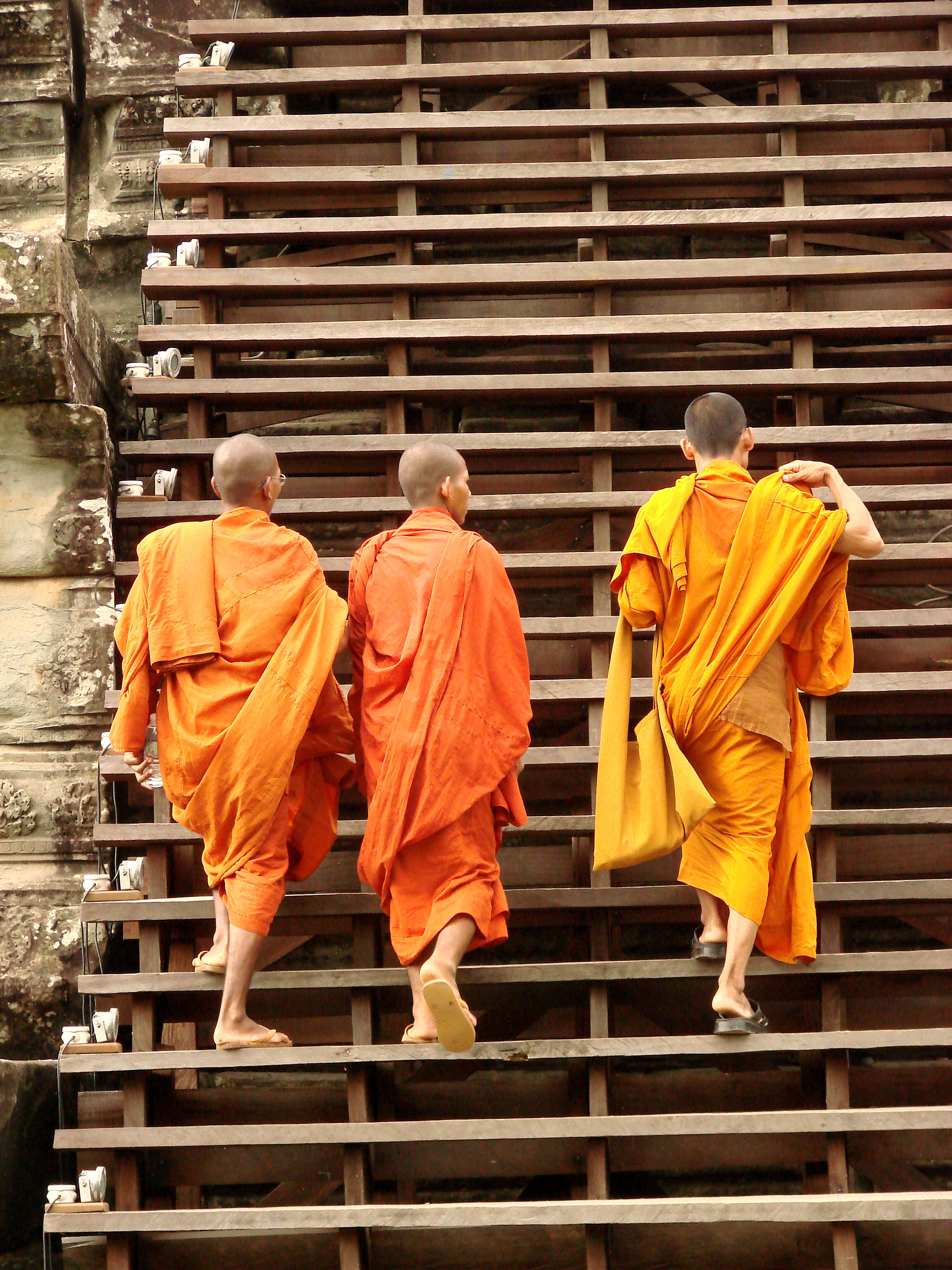
Modesty in dress for Buddhist monks visiting the Hindu-Buddhist temple complex Angkor Wat, Cambodia

Most world religions have sought to address the moral issues that arise from people's sexuality in society and in human interactions. Each major religion has developed moral codes covering issues of sexuality, morality, ethics, etc. Besides other aspects of sexuality, these moral codes seek to regulate the situations which can give rise to sexual interest and to influence people's behaviour and practices which could arouse such interest, or which overstate a person's sexuality. These religious codes have always had a strong influence on people's attitudes to issues of modesty in dress, behaviour, speech, etc.

=== Buddhism ===
Modesty (appicchatà or hiri) is the quality of being unpretentious about one's virtues or achievements. Genuinely modest people are able to see themselves as they really are and rejoice in their good qualities without becoming vain or self-promoting, and acknowledge their faults without shame or self-loathing.

Modesty in dress is important in Buddhism. The Sekhiya rules of Buddhist Monastic code, for example, provide guidelines on proper clothing as well as recommended ways of dressing for monks.

I will wear the lower robe [upper robe] wrapped around (me): a training to be observed.

— Code 1.2, Sekhiya Rule,

I will not go [sit] with robes hitched up in inhabited areas: a training to be observed.

— Code 9.10, Sekhiya Rule,

The 'robes hitched up' phrase above refers to lifting one's 1 or 2 piece cloth robe, thereby exposing either side or both sides of one's body to other human beings in an inhabited area. Such exhibitionism is not recommended to monks. Beyond monks, the Buddhist belief is that modesty has a purifying quality for everyone.

=== Christianity ===
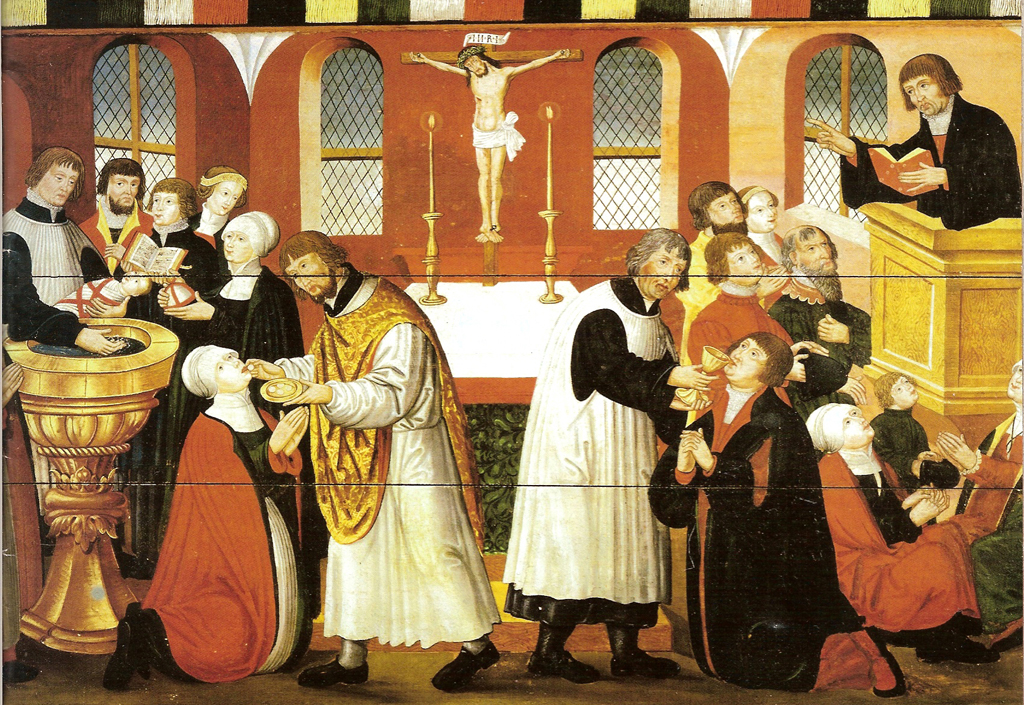
A painting of the Lutheran Divine Service shows women wearing a headcovering.

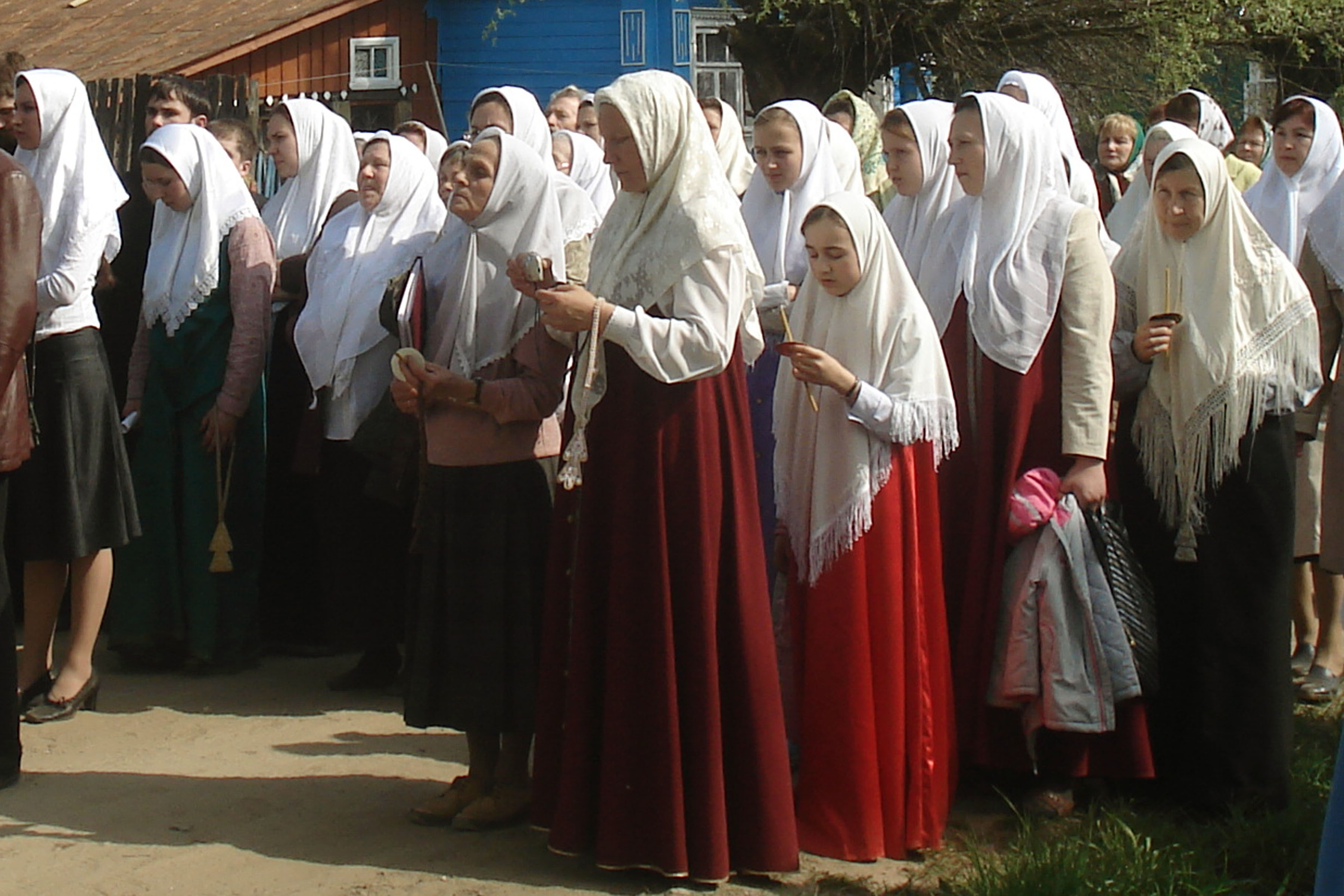
Women seen in modest dress outside a Russian Orthodox Christian, Old-Rite church

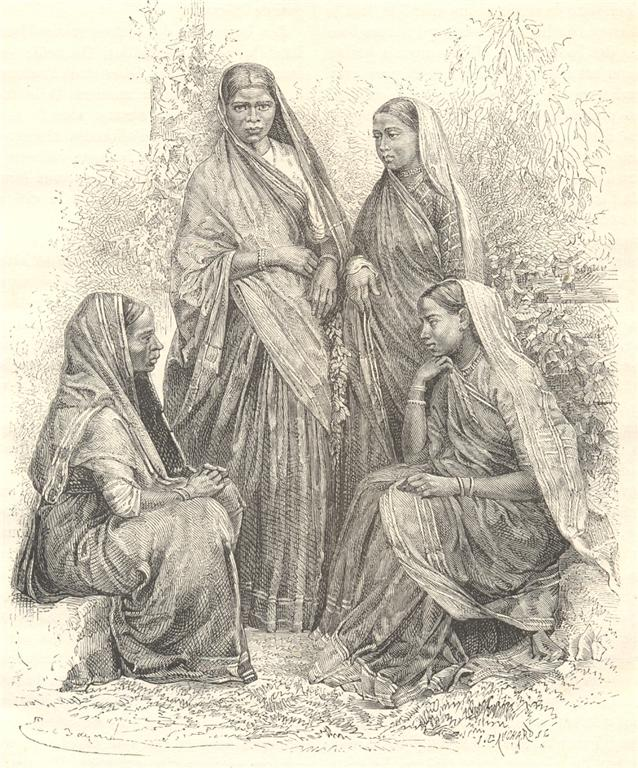
An engraving of Christian women in India (1869)

There are verses in the Christian Bible that discuss the issue of modesty. Before the fall of man, "Nakedness was 'very good' from the beginning, but its innocence was corrupted by the fall", a concept taught in Genesis 1:31 and Genesis 2:25. Genesis 3:8–10, Revelation 3:18 and Revelation 16:15 discuss that after the fall of man, "publicly exposed nakedness is a symbol of the shame of sin." In Genesis 3:7, Adam and Eve tried to cover their nakedness, though their attempt was inadequate for God and so God properly clothed humans in Genesis 3:21. Exodus 20:26 and Exodus 28:42–43 explicate that God instructed humans to cover their torso and thighs. 1 Timothy 2:9–10 instructs Christians to dress in "modest apparel" rather than to adorn themselves; in the same vein, Saint Peter wrote to Christians that "Your adornment should not be an external one: braiding the hair, wearing gold jewelry, or dressing in fine clothes, but rather the hidden character of the heart, expressed in the imperishable beauty of a gentle and calm disposition, which is precious in the sight of God" (1 Peter 3:3–4).

Historically, female communicants of traditional Christian denominations (including Anglican, Baptist, Eastern Orthodox, Lutheran, Methodist, Moravian, Oriental Orthodox, Reformed, and Roman Catholic) wore a headcovering while praying at home and worshipping in the church, or all the time as with Anabaptists such as the Mennonites and the Bruderhof, in keeping with their interpretation of 1 Corinthians 11:2–16, which has been practiced since the time of the early Church. Apostolic Tradition commands: "let all the women have their heads covered with an opaque cloth, not with a veil of thin linen, for this is not a true covering." John Chrysostom (c. 347 – 407) delineated Saint Paul's teaching on the wearing of headcoverings by Christian women, continually:

Well then: the man he compelleth not to be always uncovered, but only when he prays. "For every man," saith he, "praying or prophesying, having his head covered, dishonoureth his head." But the woman he commands to be at all times covered. Wherefore also having said, "Every woman that prayeth or prophesieth with her head unveiled, dishonoureth her head," he stayed not at this point only, but also proceeded to say, "for it is one and the same thing as if she were shaven." But if to be shaven is always dishonourable, it is plain too that being uncovered is always a reproach. And not even with this only was he content, but he added again, saying, "The woman ought to have a sign of authority on her head, because of the angels." He signifies that not at the time of prayer only but also continually, she ought to be covered. But with regard to the man, it is no longer about covering but about wearing long hair, that he so forms his discourse. To be covered he then only forbids, when a man is praying; but the wearing of long hair he discourages at all times.

These ancient Christian practices regarding modesty continue to be normative among Christians in regions such as in Eastern Europe and in South Asia, though they have waned in the Western world starting in the 1960s. Many Trinitarian Christians consider modesty extremely important, though considerable differences of opinion exist about its requirements and purposes. The early Church stressed the importance of modesty in the practice of Christianity, with early Church Father Clement of Alexandria teaching:

Woman and man are to go to church decently attired, with natural step, embracing silence, possessing unfeigned love, pure in body, pure in heart, fit to pray to God. Let the woman observe this, further. Let her be entirely covered, unless she happen to be at home. For that style of dress is grave, and protects from being gazed at. And she will never fall, who puts before her eyes modesty, and her shawl; nor will she invite another to fall into sin by uncovering her face. For this is the wish of the Word, since it is becoming for her to pray veiled. (The Instructor 3.11)

The early Christian manual Paedagogus (198 AD) teaches that clothing worn by faithful Christians should extend beyond the knees and warns against the wearing of expensive clothing, in addition to forbidding the excesses of jewelry:

As, then, in the fashioning of our clothes, we must keep clear of all strangeness, so in the use of them we must beware of extravagance. For neither is it seemly for the clothes to be above the knee, as they say was the case with the Lacedaemonian virgins; nor is it becoming for any part of a woman to be exposed. Though you may with great propriety use the language addressed to him who said, "Your arm is beautiful; yes, but it is not for the public gaze. Your thighs are beautiful but, was the reply, for my husband alone. And your face is comely. Yes; but only for him who has married me." But I do not wish chaste women to afford cause for such praises to those who, by praises, hunt after grounds of censure; and not only because it is prohibited to expose the ankle, but because it has been enjoined that the head should be veiled and the face covered; for it is a wicked thing for beauty to be a snare to men.

Early ecclesiastical writer Tertullian echoed the same teachings regarding modesty in his On the Apparel of Women, also including a prohibition on Christian men and women dyeing their hair. Rather than to ostentatiously display the hair, Tertullian said that Christian women are to wear a headcovering in public. He taught that Christians should be able to be easily distinguished from non-Christians by their wearing of modest clothing.

==== Anabaptists ====
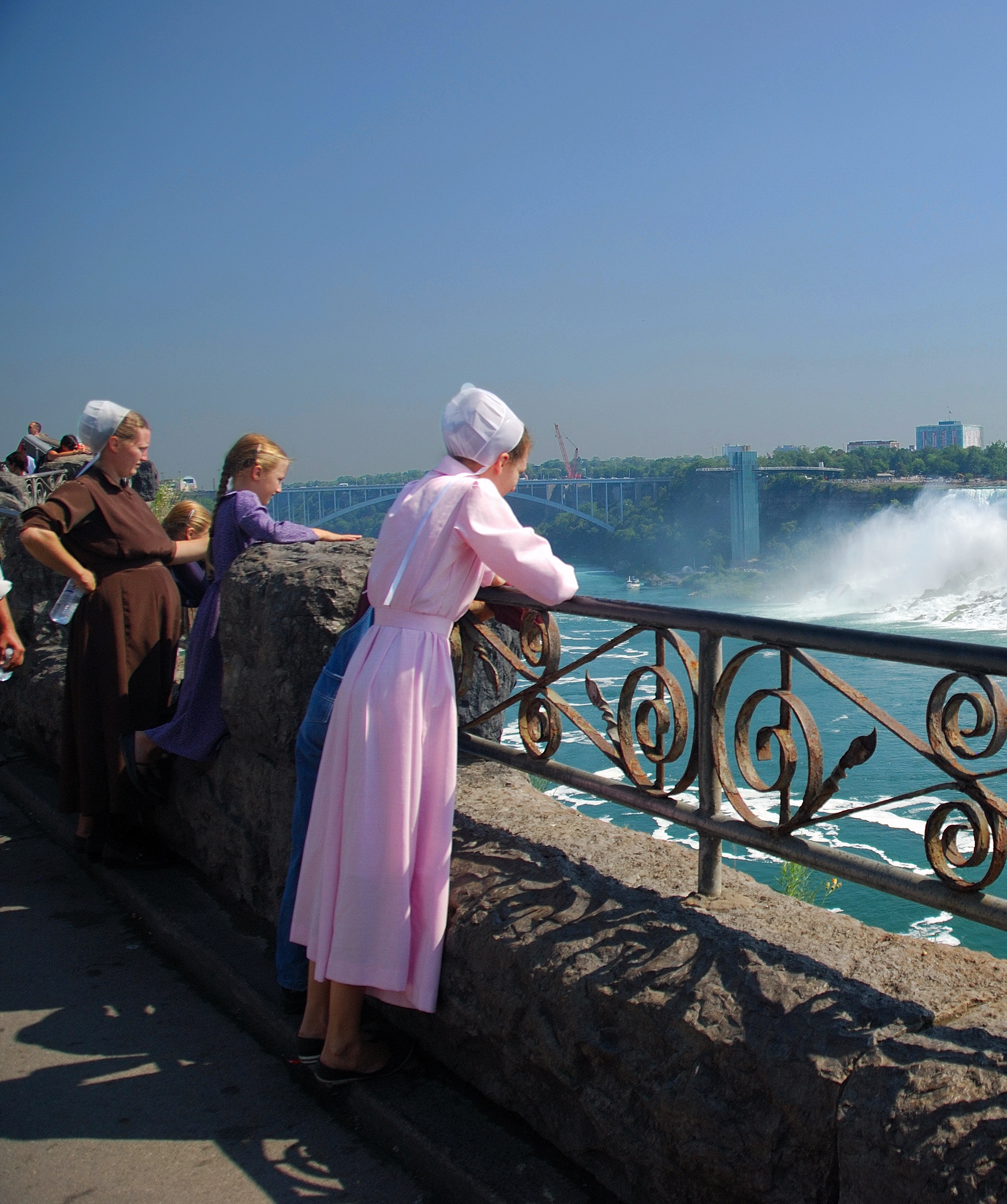
An Anabaptist Christian lady wearing a cape dress and headcovering

Many Christians belonging to the Conservative Anabaptist and Old Order Anabaptist traditions (including the Amish, Conservative Mennonites, Old Order Mennonites, Hutterites, Apostolic Christians, Charity Christians, Bruderhof, River Brethren and Schwarzenau Brethren) have plain dress prescriptions designed to achieve modesty and create a sense of church identity, as Petrovich writes: "Their dress standard is not only intended to specify a pattern which all members agree to be a modest covering for the human form but must also correspond to their vision of Jesus as meek and humble, dressed as a simple peasant from a common village. Since an established dress standard promotes uniformity, it also provides a sense of shared purpose." These requirements are either written in denominational or congregational statements or are understood and reinforced through informal pressure and ministerial reminders.

Requirements vary across churches and denominations; however, all conservative Anabaptist women wear Christian headcoverings and a skirt or dress, and all men wear long trousers. From there, considerable variation exists in men's, women's, and children's styles. Anabaptist adherents read a church group's relative strictness, distance from popular culture, and even religious ideas by their appearance and the speed of dress changes. Accordingly, the extent to which popular fashion elements show up in an Anabaptist person's dress often depends on the social distance of that church from popular culture. For example, women's headcoverings have numerous subtle design elements that distinguish church association, age, and attitude toward modest dress. Women in more fashion-conscious groups, especially among some Conservative Mennonites as well as young adults among some Old Order Amish, may wear a lacy doily that fits a stylized appearance, whereas groups and individuals holding to a distinctive form of modesty wear a fixed-style kapp with a back part that covers the hair bun and is pleated to a front part that vertically encircles the head.

Churches vary in how much members may experiment with modesty and fashion in dress. Some groups, for example, may be less inclined to censure tight dresses so long as the church's distinctive style is maintained or to censure popular swimwear worn while swimming in groups or in public; others carefully observe and embrace their church's pattern for modest, distinct dress on all non-private occasions.

==== Catholicism ====
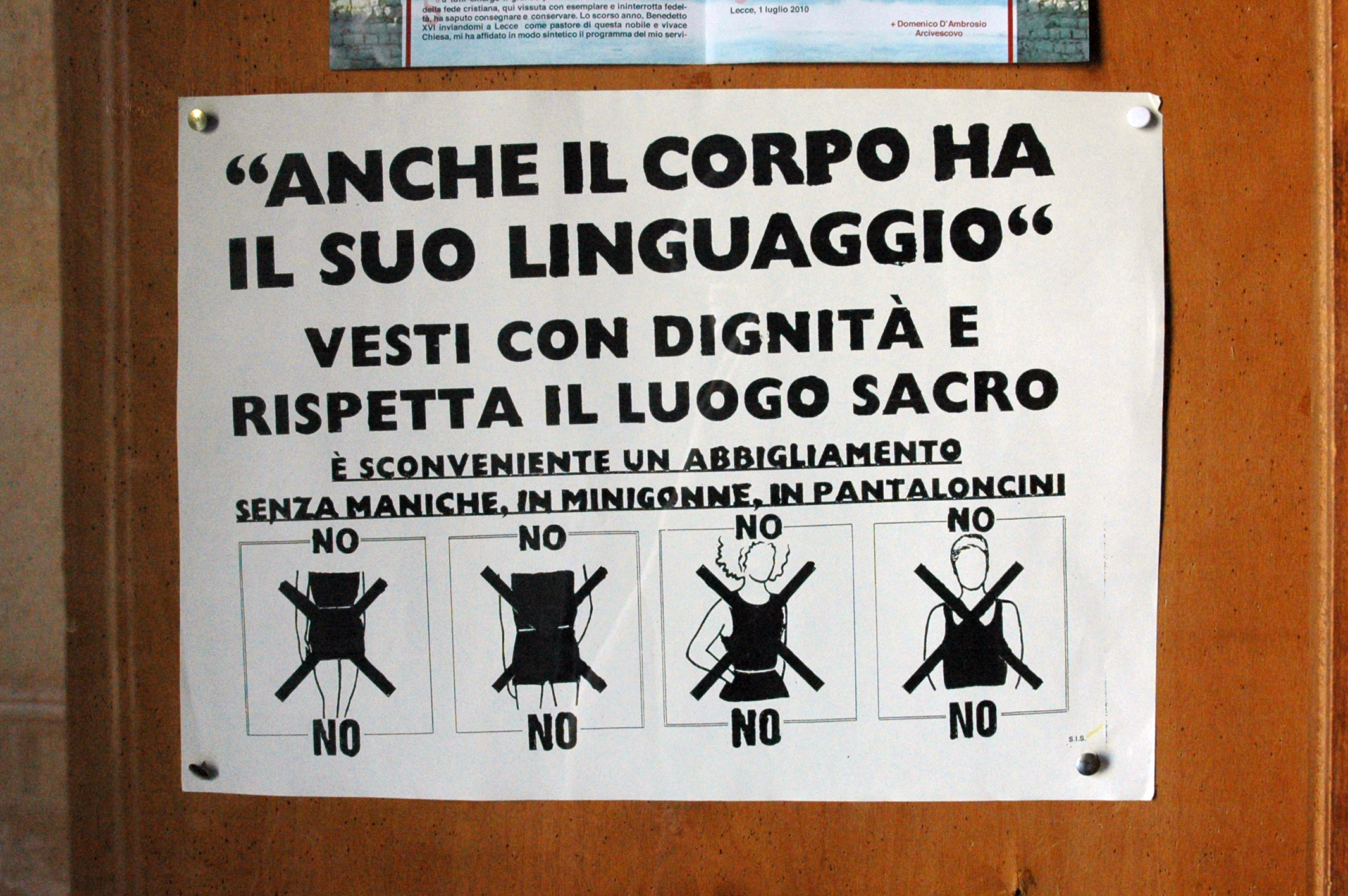
A placard "Dress with dignity and respect the sacred place" informs visitors about the minimum dress standards required to enter the Lecce Cathedral in Italy.

Saint Thomas Aquinas defined modesty as "humility, studiousness, temperance in outward movements and in apparel". The Second Vatican Council included "modesty in speech" as a learning objective for candidates undertaking seminary training.

The Catechism of the Catholic Church points out that "Modesty is decency. It inspires one's choice of clothing" (CCC, 2522)."

The wearing of a veil (headcovering) for women while praying at home and while worshipping at Mass has been practiced by Christian women since the time of the early Church. The wearing of headcoverings during the celebration of the liturgy was mandated as a universal rule for the Latin Church by the Code of Canon Law of 1917, abrogated by the Code of Canon Law of 1983.

The standards issued by Pope Pius XI declared that "women who wear immodest dress shall be denied Holy Communion, and shall not be admitted as a godmother at Baptism or as a sponsor at Confirmation". They further stated "Nuns, in accordance with the Letter of 23 August 1928, of the Sacred Congregation of Religious, shall not admit to their colleges, schools, oratories, or amusement centers, nor allow to remain there any girls who do not observe Christian modesty in dress; and in the education of their charges they shall take special care to sow deeply in their hearts a love of chastity and Christian modesty.

Pope Pius XI also issued the standard of decent dress, declaring that "A dress cannot be called decent which is cut deeper than two fingers breadth under the pit of the throat; which does not cover the arms at least to the elbows; and scarcely reaches a bit beyond the knees. Furthermore, dresses of transparent materials are improper."

Between 1933 and 1980, the Catholic Legion of Decency was active in monitoring morally objectionable content in films. It condemned a number of films, including several on account of the clothing worn. For example, the Legion has condemned the display of cleavage in The Outlaw (1941) and in The French Line (1954).

In 1944 on the feast of the Immaculate Conception, the so-called "Marylike Crusade" (formally known as the "Purity Crusade of Mary Immaculate") was initiated by Rev. Bernard Kunkel to codify Pope Pius' XII directives on the Catholic standards of dress, known as "Marylike modesty". It seeks for Christians to emulate the Blessed Virgin Mary under the title "Mother Most Chaste" as the model for modesty. Mary-like Modesty includes for women, wearing sleeves "extending at least to the elbows" and "skirts reaching below the knees", as well as having a neckline no more than two inches with the rest of the bodice fully covered. The Marylike Crusade promotes a vow for Catholics to take: "While I am determined always to dress with Marylike modesty, both at home and in public, I intend to be specially careful to do so when visiting any place dedicated to God." The Marylike Crusade received an Apostolic Blessing from Pope Pius XII on 14 July 1954 and on 11 May 1955, Pope Pius XII extended this "to the members, to their Directors and Moderators, to their families and loved ones, and to all who further their laudable movement for modesty in dress and behaviour." The standards of Mary-like Modesty established by the Purity Crusade of Mary Immaculate continue to be promoted by Traditionalist Catholics as normative.

In 2004 Cardinal Anthony Okogie sent letters to the priests in the Roman Catholic Archdiocese of Lagos and asked them to prohibit "fashions promoting lust and immorality" within churches. Under this rubric, people wearing "clothes which reveal sensitive parts of the body such as the bust, chest, belly, or upper arms, transparent clothing or dresses with slits above the knees" are forbidden to attend Mass inside the church. The faithful Catholics in the Archdiocese have been wholly supportive of the dictum concerning modesty, with many women practicing Christian headcovering with the Virgin Mary as their model.

Some Catholics have attempted to form cohesive theories of modesty. Sometimes this is from a sociological perspective, while at other times it takes a more systematic, Thomistic approach, combined with the writings of the Church Fathers. Approaches arguing primarily from traditional practices and traditional authorities, such as the saints, can also be found. In various localities, from time to time the church hierarchy have given opinions on various matters regarding dressing and modesty of the faithful. While Nicholas the Great wrote to the first Christian ruler of Bulgaria, Boris I, in the 9th century, that it was acceptable for the Bulgarian women to continue to wear trousers, Giuseppe Cardinal Siri stated in 1960 that trousers were unacceptable dress for women. Many traditional Catholics have attempted to further expand on this latter standard. Around 1913, it became fashionable for dresses to be worn with a modest round or V-shaped neckline. In the German Empire, for example, all Roman Catholic bishops joined in issuing a pastoral letter attacking the new fashions.

==== Methodists ====
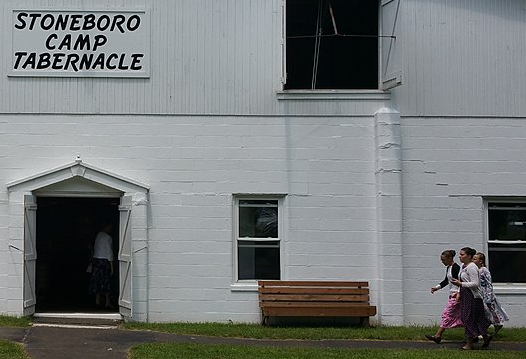
Wesleyan Methodist girls enter the tabernacle at a camp meeting.

Methodists belonging to the conservative holiness movement, such as the Allegheny Wesleyan Methodist Connection and Evangelical Wesleyan Church, have guidelines on modest apparel in accordance with the Wesleyan-Arminian doctrine of outward holiness. The Fellowship of Independent Methodist Churches, which continues to observe the ordinance of women's headcovering, stipulates "renouncing all vain pomp and glory" and "adorning oneself with modest attire." Their interpretation of Exodus 20:26 and Exodus 28:42–43 is seen as forbidding the exposure of the body from torso to thighs, while Deuteronomy 22:5 is interpreted as God mandating gender-distinct clothing. The 2015 Discipline of the Evangelical Wesleyan Church, for example, states: "We require our women to appear in public with dresses of modest length, sleeves of modest length, modest necklines and modest hose; the wearing of split skirts, slacks, jeans, artificial flowers or feathers is forbidden." It goes on:

Moreover, we require our men to conform to the scriptural standards of decent and modest attire; we require that when they appear in public they wear shirts with sleeves of modest length. We require that all our people appear in public with sleeves below the elbows. Women's hemlines are to be modestly below the knees. Our people are forbidden to appear in public with transparent or immodest apparel, including shorts or bathing suits. Parents are required to dress their children modestly in conformity with our general principles of Christian attire. We further prohibit our people from participating in the practices of body-piercing, tattooing or body art.

==== Pentecostals ====
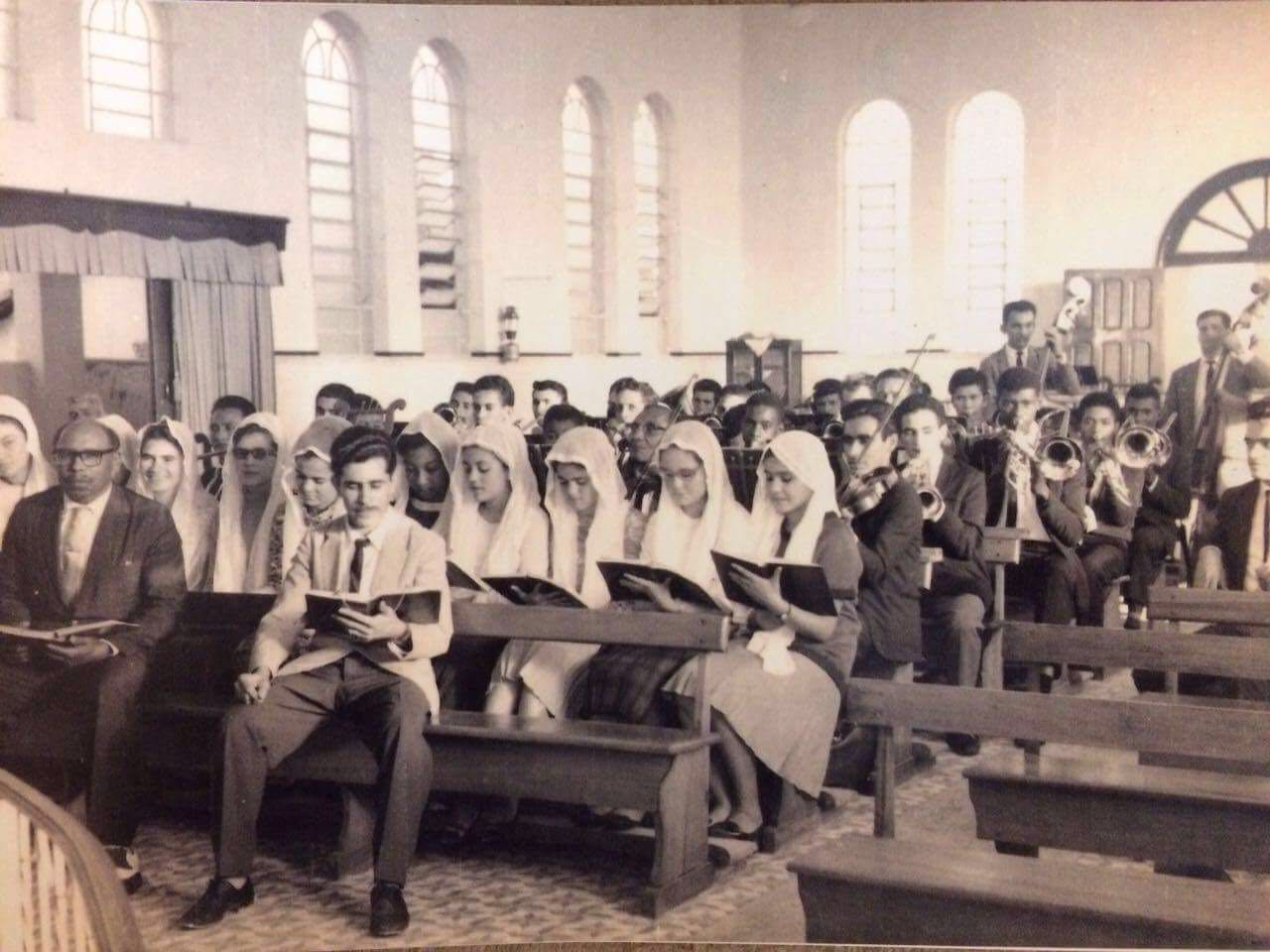
Pentecostal worshippers of the Christian Congregation, with women wearing headcoverings and dresses

Holiness Pentecostalism, the original trunk of Pentecostal Christianity, historically affirms the doctrine of outward holiness, which is reflected in the wearing of modest clothing. Holiness Pentecostals have historically taught a distinction between the male sex and female sex with respect to gender distinct clothing; they do not wear adornment, such as jewelry and makeup. The Apostolic Faith Church and the Free Gospel Church, for example, subscribe to these Holiness Pentecostal standards; in addition to these, the Ukrainian Pentecostal Church adheres to the ordinance of women's headcovering (cf. 1 Corinthians 11:4–13).

Oneness Pentecostalism, another branch of Pentecostal Christianity, teaches the wearing of modest clothing. Oneness Pentecostal denominations, such as the United Pentecostal Church International, maintain the teaching of gender distinctions, including a belief that men should have short hair and women should not cut their hair (cf. 1 Corinthians 11:14–15). While at the beach, women wear swimming dresses rather than what adherents would consider revealing bathing suits. Oneness Pentecostals do not adorn themselves with cosmetics or jewelry. Additionally, certain Oneness Pentecostal denominations, such as the Church of Our Lord Jesus Christ of the Apostolic Faith, observe the wearing of headcoverings by Christian women (cf. 1 Corinthians 11:4–13).

==== Quakers ====
Conservative Friends and Holiness-Orthodox Friends, two associations of Quaker Christians, wear plain dress as part of their testimony of simplicity.

==== Church of Jesus Christ of Latter-day Saints ====
The Church of Jesus Christ of Latter-day Saints (LDS Church) has issued official statements on modest dress for its members. Clothing such as "short shorts and short skirts, shirts that do not cover the stomach, and clothing that does not cover the shoulders or is low-cut in the front or the back" are discouraged. Men and women are also encouraged to avoid extremes in clothing or hairstyles. Rules on modesty also include women being asked to wear no more than one pair of earrings. Women are generally expected to wear skirts or dresses for church services. Most LDS members do not wear sleeveless shirts or shorts that do not reach the knee.

The church-funded university, Brigham Young University (BYU), requires students and tenants of BYU housing to sign an agreement to live according to these standards of modesty.

=== Hinduism ===
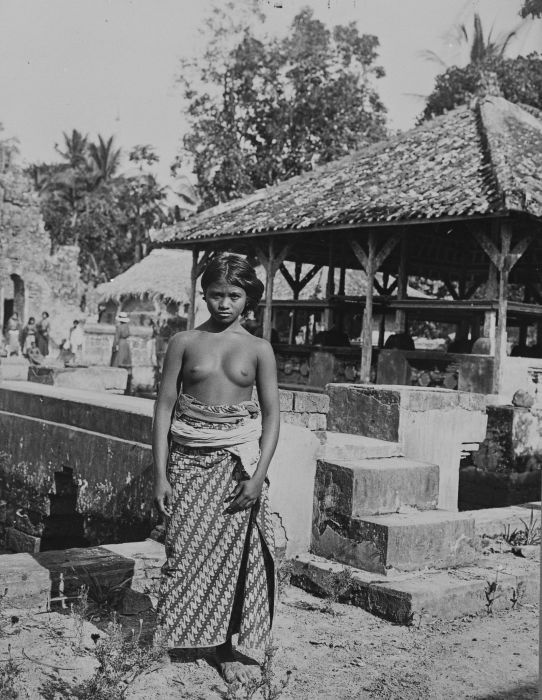
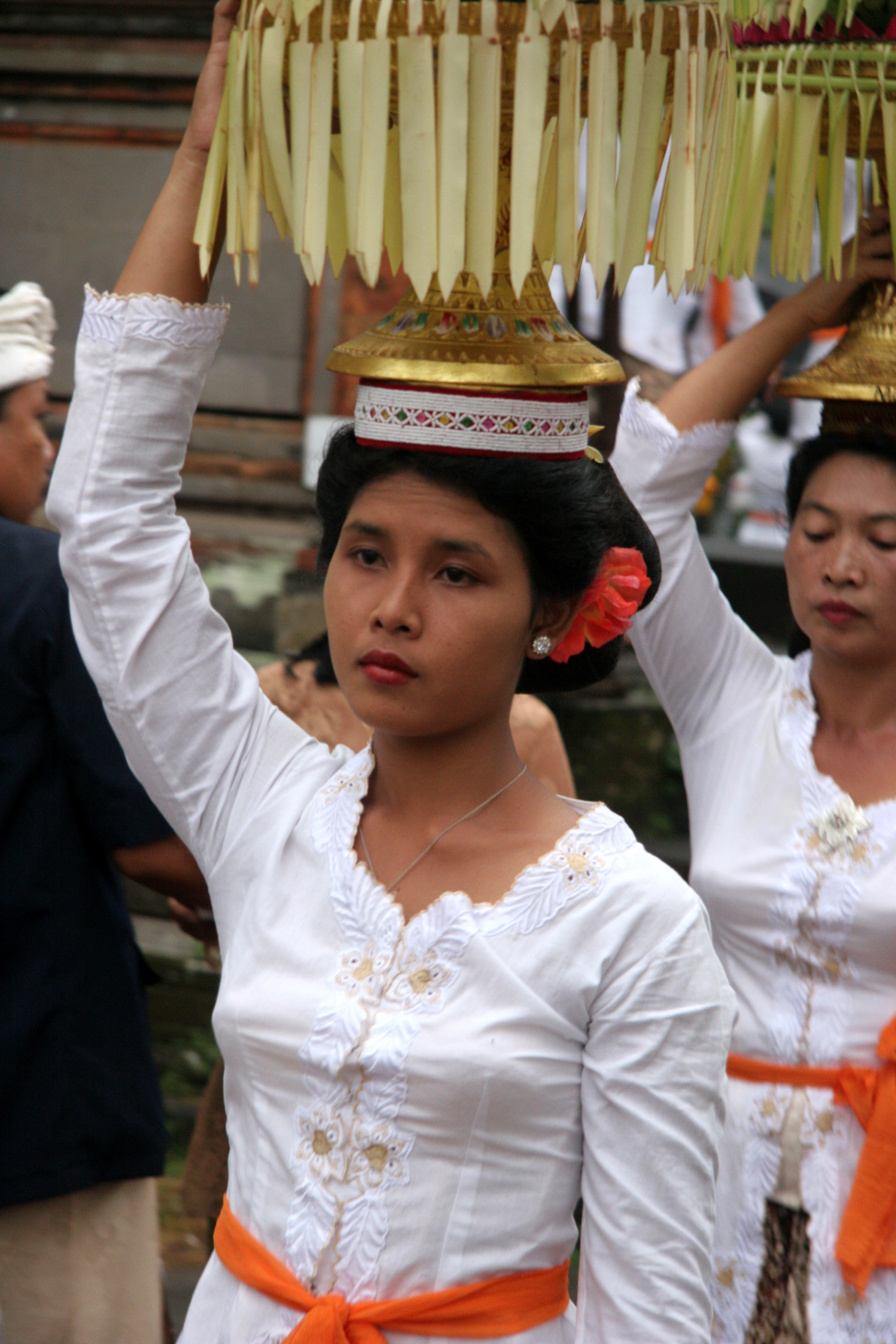
Dressing norms and concepts of modesty have widely varied among Hindus before the 20th century. Above is a topless Balinese (Indonesian) Hindu woman at a temple complex in 1922, during Dutch colonial rule of Indonesia. In the background, in the center left, one can see other topless women, as well as a woman who is fully covered in European dress. The colored image is typical dress observed in modern day Bali temples.

The premise and concepts of modesty have evolved under Hinduism. During Vedic times, both women and men wore at least two pieces of draped dress that was largely undifferentiated, voluntary and flexible. Stitched clothes such as skirts and bodices were also common in the Vedic period. However, modesty was not determined by the precepts of religion, but by local traditions, social codes, profession, circumstances and occasion. The multiple pieces of draped dress for women evolved into a single length of draped cloth among Indian Hindus, now called a sari; but it remained two or more pieces for Southeast Asian Hindus. For men, the draped dress reduced to one piece, now called by various names such as dhoti, lungi, pancha, laacha and other names among Indian Hindus, and kamben among Balinese Hindu.

The Hindu belief, suggests Christopher Bayly, is that modesty through appropriate dress has the energy to transmit spirit and substance in a social discourse. Dress serves as a means of expression or celebration, with some dressing elements such as saffron threads or white dress worn by men as moral, transformative and a means to identify and communicate one's social role in a gathering, or one's state of life such as mourning in days or weeks after the death of a loved one.

The canons of modesty for Hindus in South Asia underwent significant changes with the arrival of Islam in the 12th century. The Islamic rulers imposed a dress code in public places for Hindu dhimmis, per their Islamic mores of modesty. The sari worn by Hindu women extended to provide a veil, as well as a complete cover of her navel and legs. In the early 18th century, Tryambakayajvan—a court official in south central India—issued an edict called Stridharmapaddhati. The ruling outlined a required dress code for orthodox Hindus in that region. Stridharmapaddhati laced social trends with Hindu religion to place new rules on modesty for women, but gave much freedom to men.

The concept of modesty evolved again during colonial times when the British administration required Indians to wear dresses to help identify and segregate the local native populations. Bernard Cohn and others remark that dress during the colonial era became part of a wider issue in India about respect, honor and modesty, with the dress code intentionally aimed by the administration to reflect the relationship between the British ruler and the Indian ruled. The British colonial empire encouraged and sometimes required Indians to dress in an 'oriental manner', to help define and enforce a sense of modesty and to identify roles and a person's relative social status. Among Indonesian Hindus, the accepted practice of toplessness among teenage Hindu girls changed during the Dutch colonial rule, with women now wearing a blouse or colorful cloth.

==== Temples ====
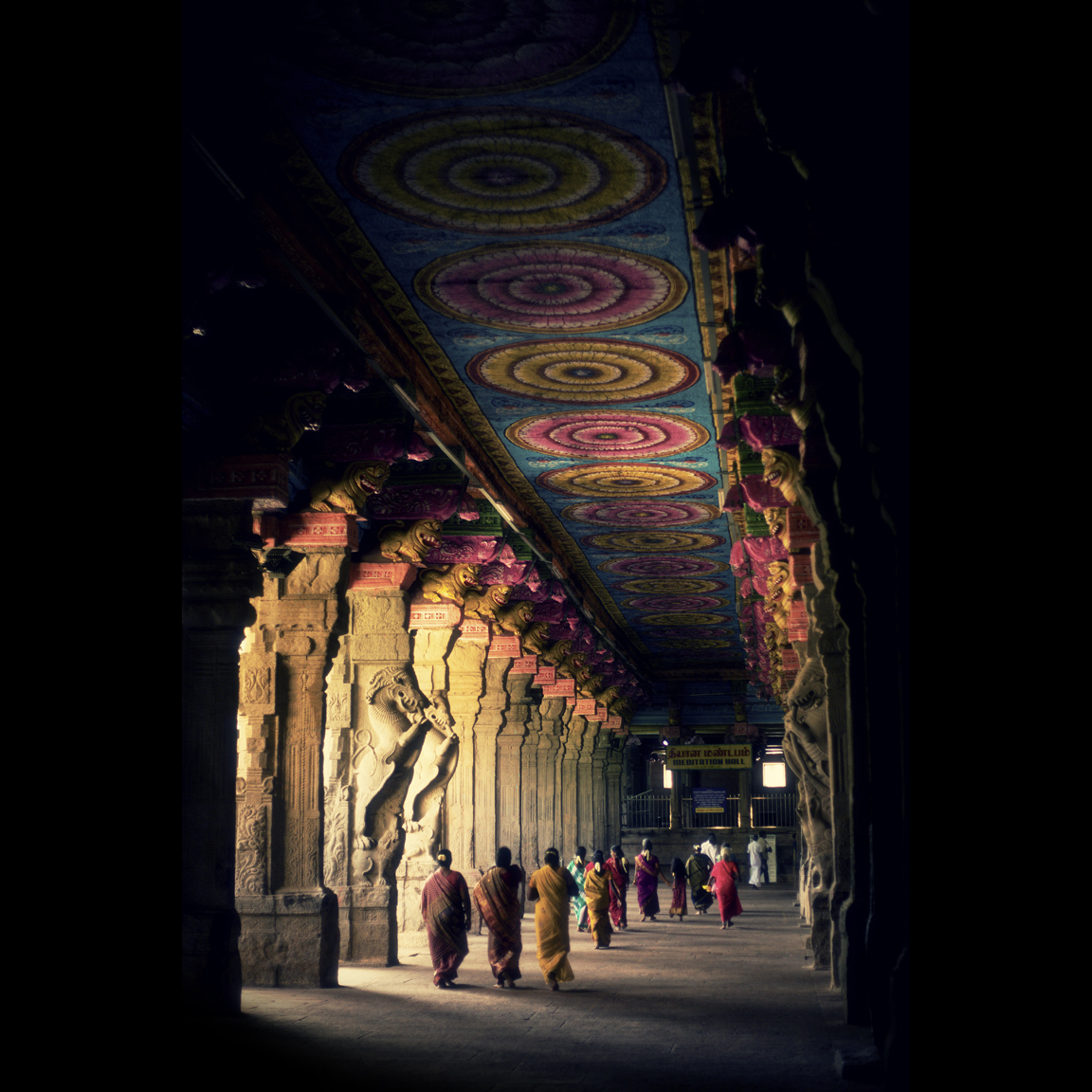
Women dressed in saris, heading into a South Indian Hindu Temple

Inside most Hindu temples, there is an expectation of modesty rather than sexual allurement. Men and women typically wear traditional dress during religious ceremonies and rituals in a temple, with women wearing saris or regional Indian dress. In Indonesia and Cambodia, Hindu temple visitors are often requested to wrap their waist with a traditional single piece cloth called kamben, wastra or sarung, with or without saput.

==== Current trends ====
Hindus have diverse views on modesty, with significant regional and local variations. Among orthodox Hindu populations, sexually revealing dress or any sexual behaviour in public or before strangers is considered immodest, particularly in rural areas. In contrast, the dress of deities and other symbolism in Hindu temples, the discussion of dress and eroticism in ancient Hindu literature, and art works of Hinduism can be explicit, celebrating eroticism and human sexuality.

In general, a disregard of modesty can be confusing or distressing, in particular to traditional Hindu women. Even in a health care context, some Hindu women may express reluctance to undress for examination. If undressing is necessary, the patient may prefer to be treated by a doctor or nurse of the same sex.

=== Islam ===
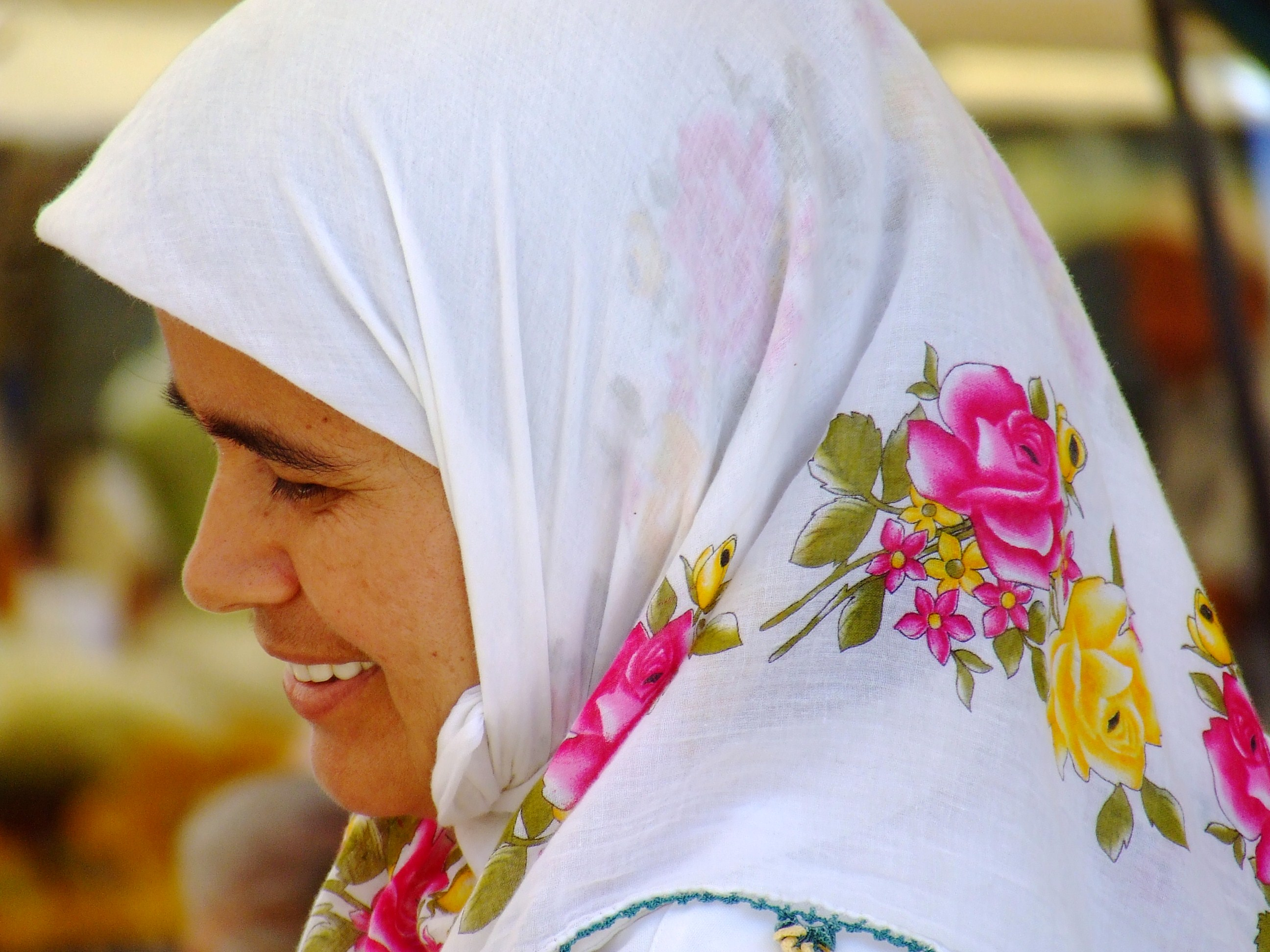
A headscarf

Islam has strongly emphasized the concept of decency and modesty. In many authentic hadiths, it has been quoted that "modesty (Haya) is a part of faith". Modesty is verily required in the interaction between members of the opposite sex and in some case between the members of same sex also. Dress code is part of that overall teaching.

Among Muslim consumers, spending on modest fashion rose by 4.8% between 2022 and 2023 and is expected to reach $428 billion by 2027.

==== Women ====
"And tell the believing women to cast down their glances and guard their private parts and not expose their adornment except that which [necessarily] appears thereof and to wrap [a portion of] their headcovers over their chests and not expose their adornment except to their husbands, their fathers, their husbands' fathers, their sons, their husbands' sons, their brothers, their brothers' sons, their sisters' sons, their women, that which their right hands possess, or those male attendants having no physical desire, or children who are not yet aware of the private aspects of women." -Quran 24:31.

"O Prophet! Say to your wives, your daughters, and the women of the believers that: they should let down upon themselves their jalabib." -Quran 33:59. Jalabib is an Arabic word meaning "loose outer garment".

In some Muslim societies, women wear the niqab, a veil that covers the whole face except the eyes, or the full burqa, a full-body covering garment that occasionally does cover the eyes. Wearing these garments is common in some, but not all, countries with a predominately Muslim population.

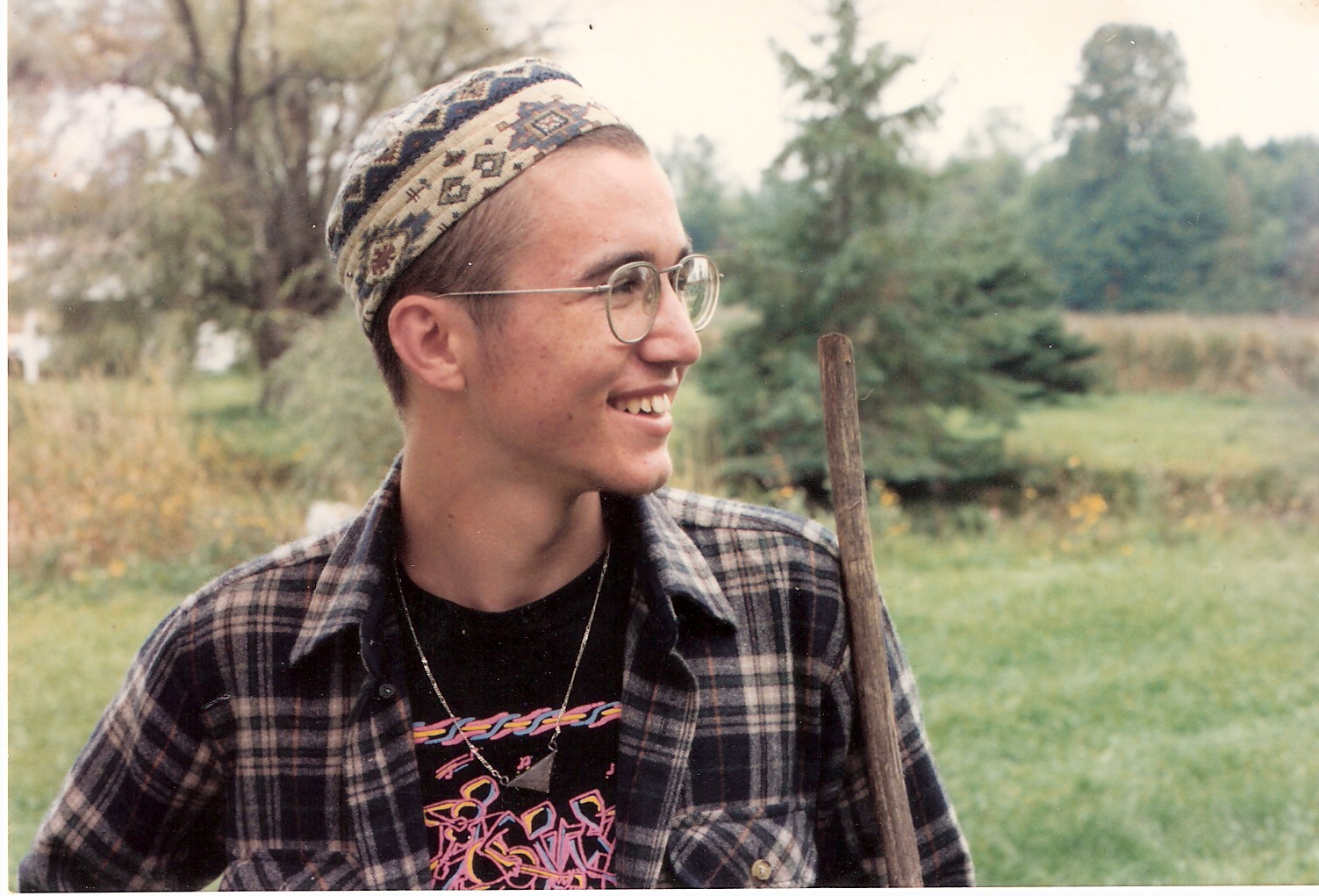
A taqiyah cap

Though by some scholars these expressions of modesty are interpreted as mandatory, most countries do not enforce modesty by law. However, a few countries, such as Saudi Arabia, Afghanistan and Iran, enforce specified standards of dress for women.

==== Men ====
"Tell the believing men to cast down their glances and guard their private parts. That is purer for them. Indeed, Allah is [well] acquainted with what they do." -Quran 24:30

Most scholars agree that men are required to cover everything from the navel to the knees at minimum with loose clothing, some men choose also to wear the traditional Islamic cap (taqiyah), similar to the Jewish yarmulke or kippah. The taqiyah may vary in shape, size, and color, with differences according to tradition, region, and personal taste.

=== Judaism ===
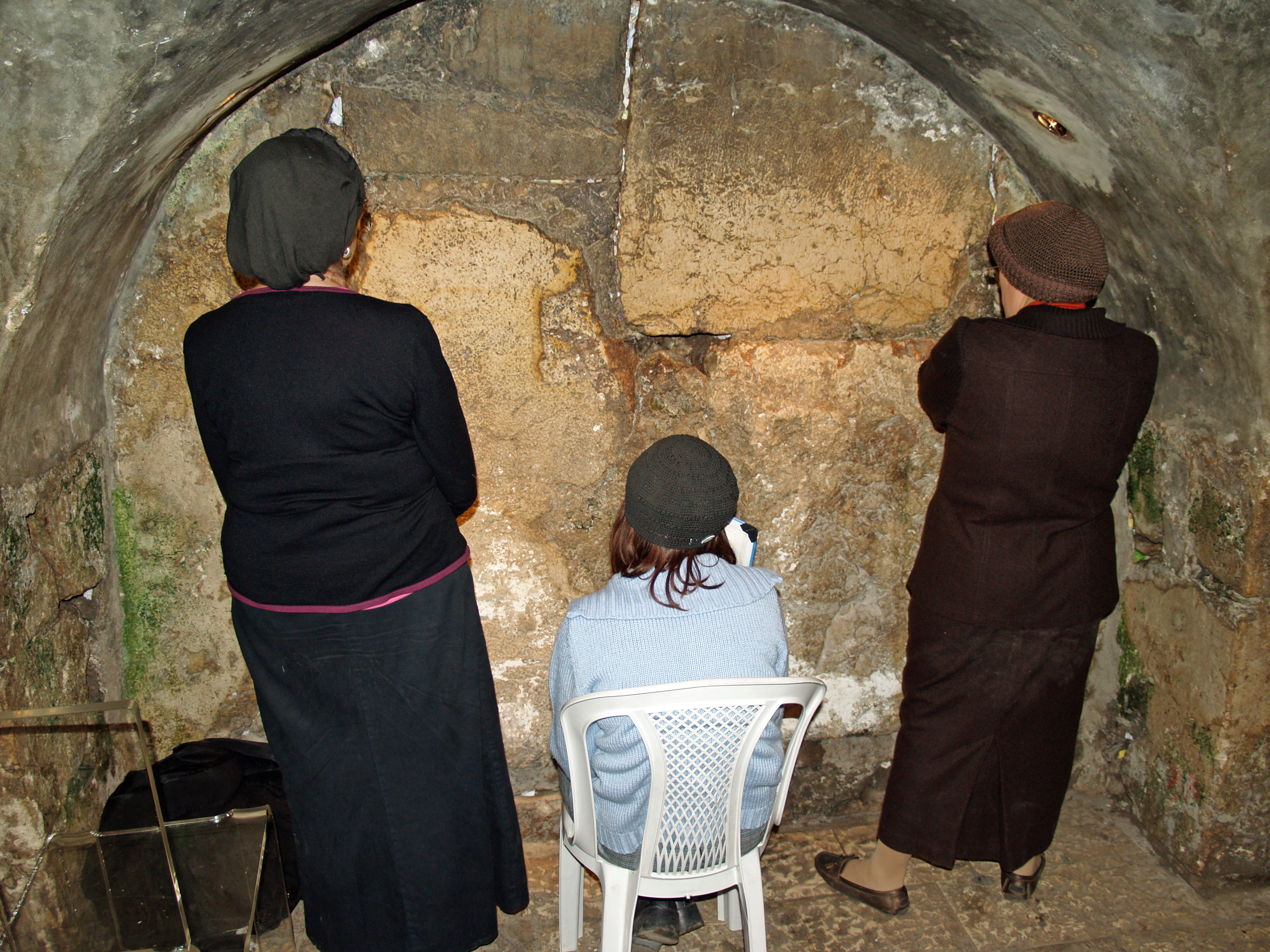
Three styles of hair covering popular in Jewish women. From right to left: snood, fall, and hat.

Modesty in Judaism, called Tzniut (Hebrew: צניעות), is important beyond aspects of clothing. It extends to behaviour in public and in private, and depends on the context.

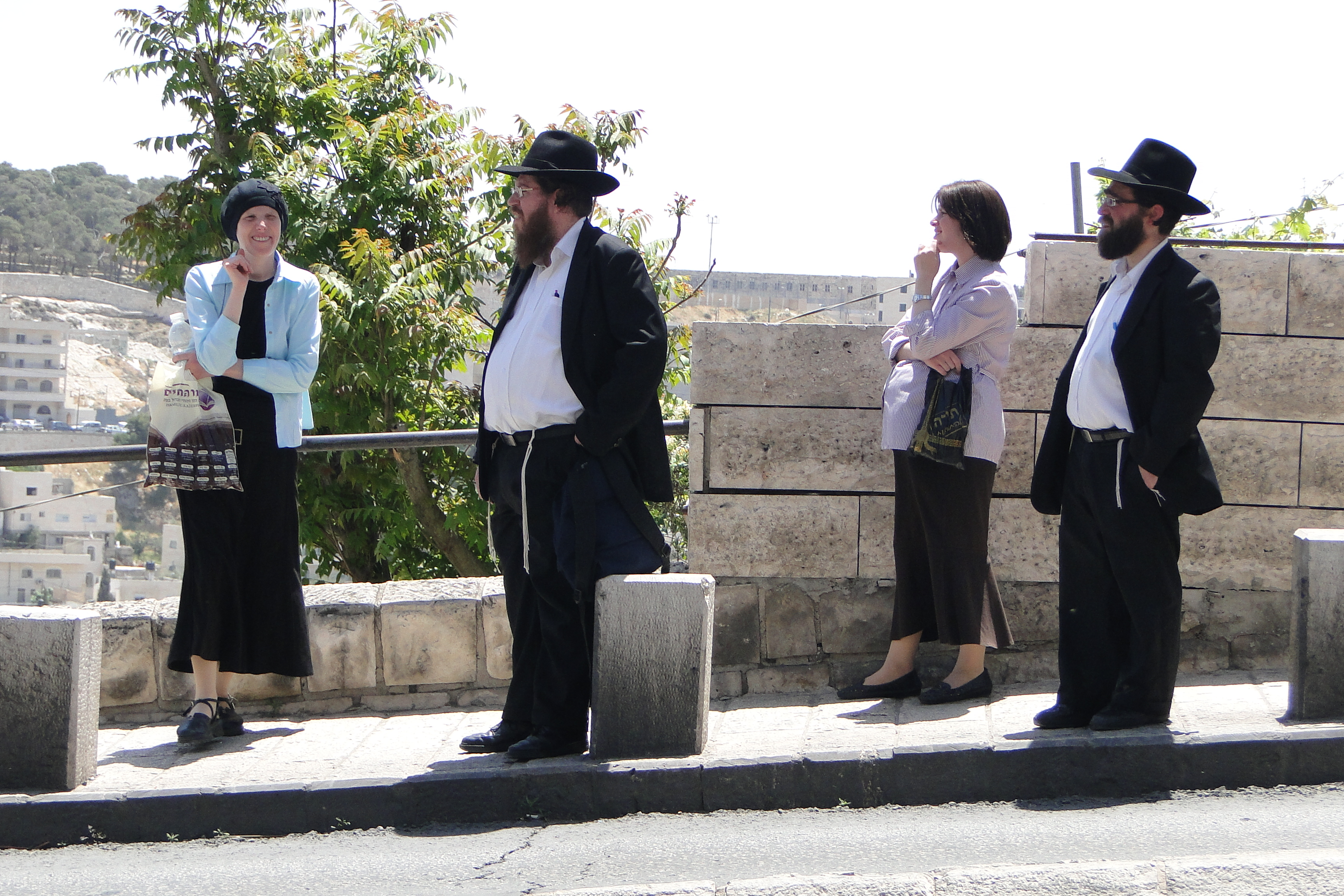
Typical Haredi dress for men and women

==== Women ====
Orthodox and ultra-Orthodox Jewish women usually wear skirts that cover their knees, with blouses or shirts covering the collarbone and sleeves covering the elbows. See-through materials may not be used, and clothes are expected not to be tight-fitting or "provocative". Less strict Conservative Judaism recommends modest dress, but this is not broadly observed. Less restrictive branches of Judaism tend to adopt the fashions of the society in which they live.

It is the custom for a married Orthodox Jewish woman to cover her hair in public, and sometimes at home. The hair covering may be a scarf (tichel), snood, hat, or a wig called a Sheitel.

==== Men ====
Standards of modesty also apply to men. While some Orthodox men will wear short-sleeve shirts in public, ultra-Orthodox men will not. More modern Orthodox Jewish men will be more lax in their dress when surrounded by other men (if it is not in a religious environment). Modesty for men most often translates to covering the torso and legs with loose clothing. Different groups of Orthodox Jews have different dress norms. But all have men dress in a head covering (kippah).

== In the arts ==
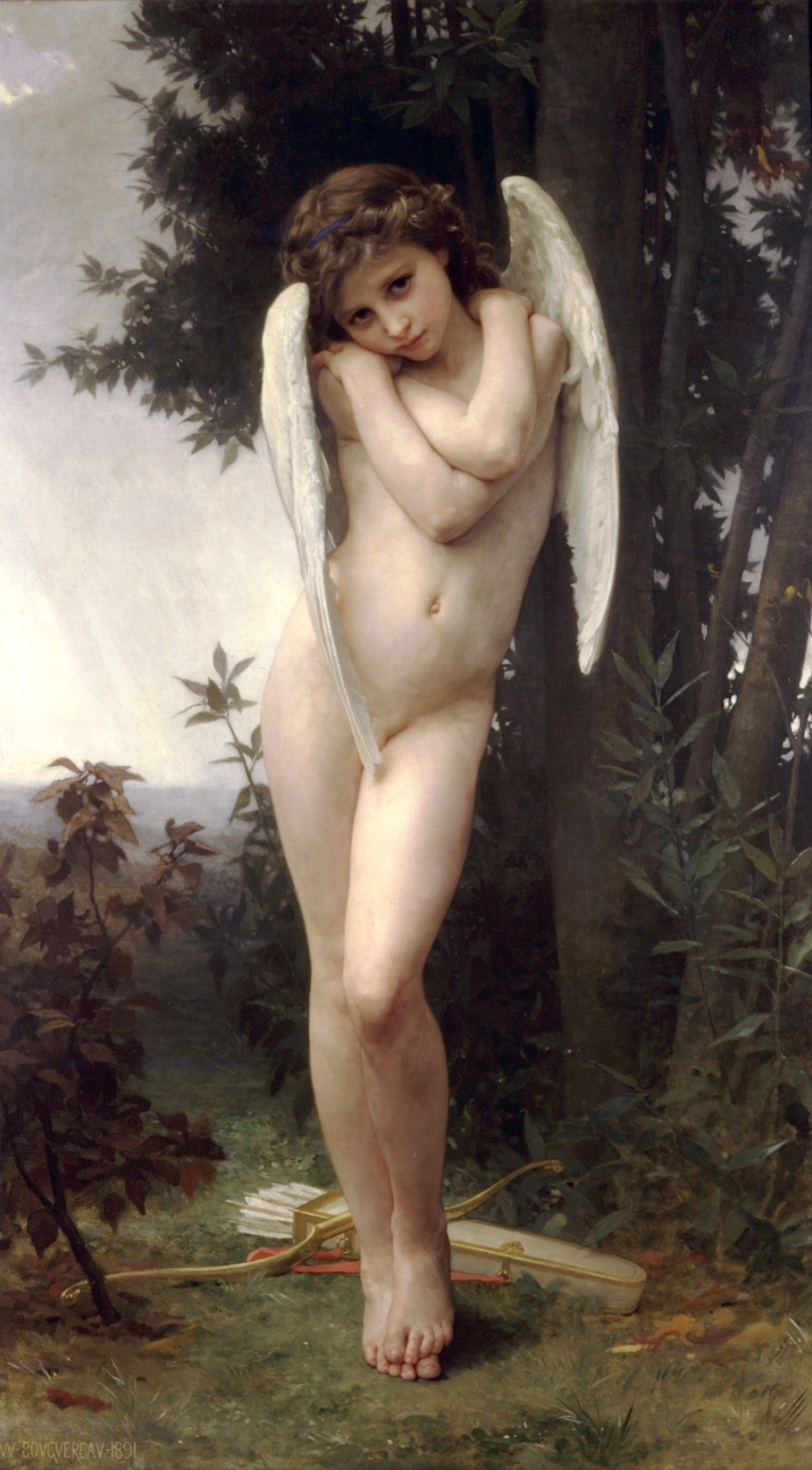
Cupidon (French for Cupid), painting by William-Adolphe Bouguereau, 1875; the tip of the boy god's right wing covers his genitals.

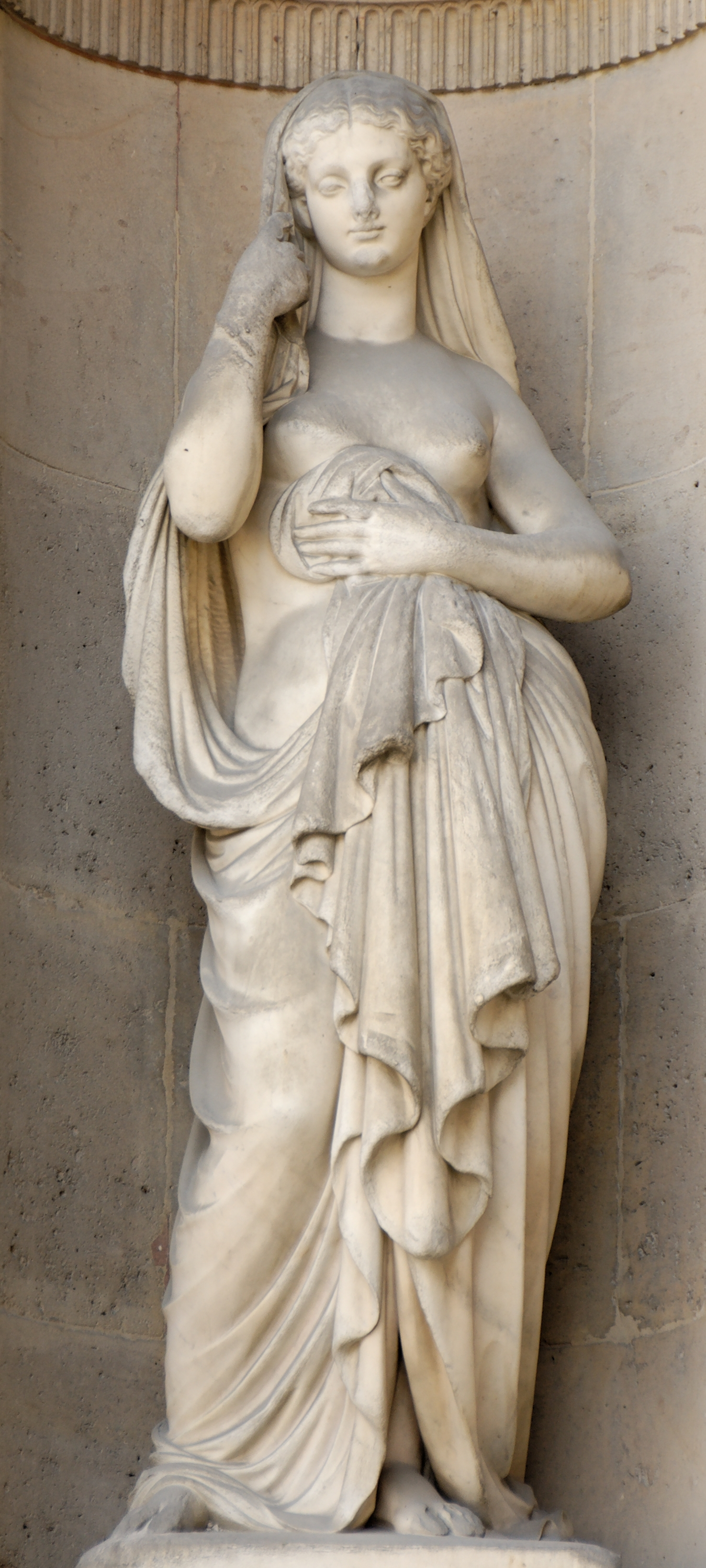
Modesty, sculpture by Louis-Léopold Chambard, 1861

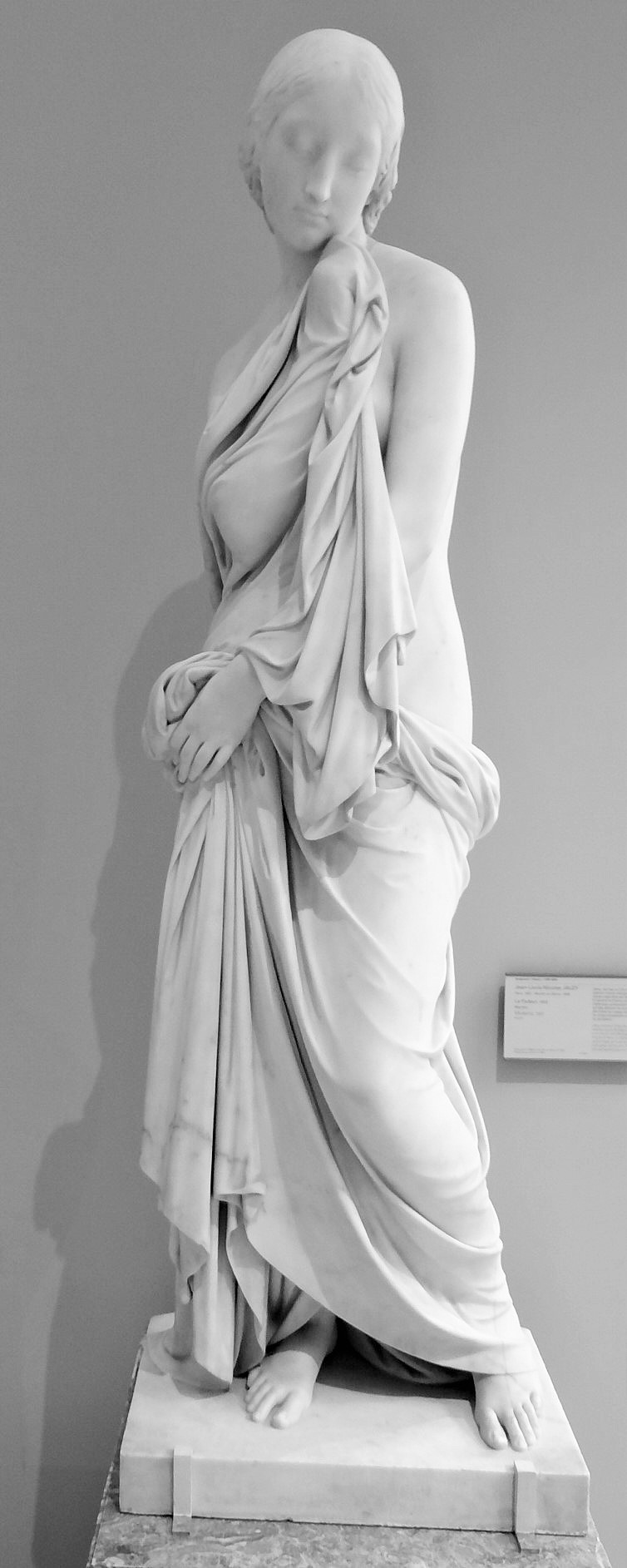
Modesty, marble statue of a partly-draped woman by Jean-Louis Jaley, 1875

Expectation of modesty also applies in the arts, though standards of modesty have varied at different times and in different places. Nudity and various types of behaviour were sometimes depicted, sometime not. In many cases where society did not allow nudity or immodest dress, nudity was accepted in art. Where nudity in art was not acceptable, full nudity was not displayed; otherwise nude subjects had their intimate parts hidden by apparently accidental draped fabric, flowers, other people, a fig leaf, etc. In films, very brief nudity was accepted. Some nude artworks had fig leaves added when standards became less permissive.

In a given society, the criteria varied according to the circumstances; for example artworks on public display were more restrained than those for private display to adults.

Nudity in art was sometimes suggested without actual depiction by:

- something seemingly by chance covering the parts of the body which should modestly be covered
- in film:
  - showing a supposedly nude person from the waist or shoulders up
  - maneuvering (turning, having objects in front) and editing in such a way that no genitals are seen
  - showing nudity from a distance, or from the back only, although other characters are nearby and/or would also see frontal nudity
  - showing nudity very briefly

In cartoons, even in cases where the genital area is not covered with clothing, genitals are often simply not drawn, as is the case in Family Guy and other animated sitcoms. In the film Barnyard, showing anthropomorphized cattle of both sexes walking on two legs, instead of either showing genitals of male cattle or not showing them, the concept of a "male cow" was used, with an udder. In Underdog a partly animated anthropomorphized dog is shown with a penis when a real dog is filmed, and without one in the animated parts.

Paintings are sometimes changed because of changed modesty standards, and later sometimes changed back. During the Counter-Reformation there was a "fig-leaf campaign" aiming to cover all representations of human genitals in paintings and sculptures that started with Michelangelo's works. Works covered in this way include the marble statue of Cristo della Minerva (church of Santa Maria sopra Minerva, Rome) which was covered by added drapery, as it remains today, and the statue of the naked child Jesus in Madonna of Bruges (The Church of Our Lady in Bruges, Belgium) remained covered for several decades. Also, the plaster copy of the David in the Cast Courts of the V&A in London has a fig leaf in a box at the back of the statue. It was there to be placed over the statue's genitals so that they would not upset visiting female royalty. The statue of Achilles at Hyde Park Corner now has an incongruous figleaf permanently attached, after it was stolen several times.

== See also ==
- Humility
- Purdah
- Jools Lebron (related to "demure" the word)
