= Östen Dahl =

Swedish linguist (born 1945)

Östen Dahl (Swedish pronunciation: [ˈœ̌sːtɛn ˈdɑ̌ːl]; born 4 November 1945 in Stockholm) is a Swedish linguist and professor best known for pioneering a marker-based approach to tense and aspect in linguistic typology. Dahl finished his PhD at the University of Gothenburg and subsequently worked there as a docent before becoming professor of general linguistics at Stockholm University in 1980.

== Honours ==
- Royal Swedish Academy of Sciences, member since 1997
- Royal Swedish Academy of Letters, History and Antiquities, member since 1998
- Academia Europaea, member since 2006
- Honorary doctorate of philosophy from the University of Helsinki in 2003
- Norwegian Academy of Science and Letters, member

== Works ==
- Tense and Aspect Systems, Oxford: Blackwell, 1985
- Edited with Maria Koptjevskaja-Tamm: The Circum-Baltic Languages: Grammar and typology, Amsterdam: Benjamins, 2001
- Grammaticalization in the North: Noun phrase morphosyntax in Scandinavian vernaculars. Berlin: Language Science Press 2015. http://langsci-press.org/catalog/view/73/17/290-1

== See also ==
- Jespersen's cycle
