= Louis-Léopold Chambard =

French sculptor

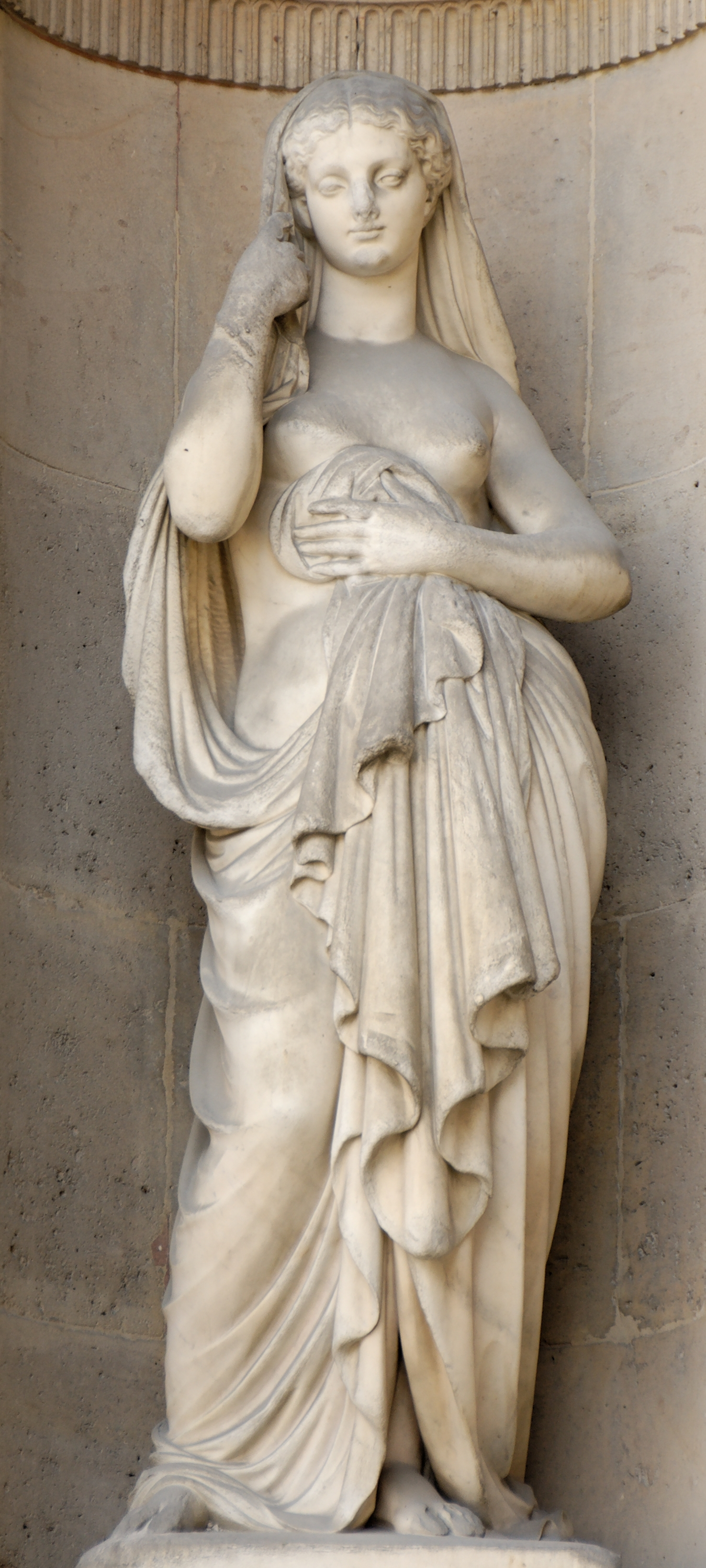
Modestie, 1861, by Louis-Léopold Chambard. East facade of the Cour Carrée in the Louvre palace, Paris.

Louis-Léopold Chambard (25 August 1811 – 10 March 1895) was a French sculptor from Jura.

He was born in Saint-Amour dans le Jura and was son of Claude Louis Joseph Marie Chambard, a merchant, After studying at the municipal school of arts in Lyon, he continued at École nationale supérieure des Beaux-Arts in Paris, under supervision of Pierre-Jean David d'Angers and Jean-Auguste-Dominique Ingres and obtained the Prix de Rome in 1837 for his sculpture Marius sur les ruines de Carthage. His success allowed him to be resident from 1838 to 1843 at Villa Medici housing the French Academy in Rome. Chambard had an exposition of his sculptures at the Salon of 1841 in Paris. Upon his return from Italy, he had other commissions notably for the Louvre. He died in Neuilly-sur-Seine in 1895.

== Main works ==
- Marius sur les ruines de Carthage, 1837
- Apollon et Coronis, 1842
- La Parure, 1850
- Une suppliante, 1852
- L'Abondance, 1857
- L'Inspiration, 1859
- La Modestie, 1861, east facade of the Cour Carrée in the Palais du Louvre, Paris
- Enfant portant une coquille, 1863
- Mercure, 1866
- La Vengeance, 1868
- Jean-Jacques Cambacérès, 1876-1877
- Rouget de l'Isle, 1880
- Folette, 1882
- Pompier qui sauve deux enfants d'un incendie, 1885
- Androclès et le lion reconnaissant, 1888
- Le Bûcheron, bronze with brown and golden brown patina
