= Elly van Gelderen =

Elly van Gelderen (born 1958) is a syntactician with a particular research interest in language change. She is the author of eleven books and eighty or so articles in journals such as Linguistic Analysis and Studia Linguistica. She has also taught at Arizona State University as an English professor since 1995.

== Most cited books ==
- van Gelderen, E. The rise of functional categories. John Benjamins, 1993 (Cited 241 times)
- van Gelderen, E. Grammaticalization as economy.. 2004 (Cited 654 times)
- van Gelderen, Elly. A History of the English Language. Amsterdam: John Benjamins, 2006. (Cited 560 times according to Google Scholar)
- van Gelderen, E. An Introduction to the Grammar of English. 2010
- van Gelderen, E. The linguistic cycle: Language change and the language faculty. Oxford University Press; 2011 (Cited 459 times)
- van Gelderen, E. Syntax: An introduction to minimalism. John Benjamins, 2017
