= Prosiopesis =

Omission of the start of an utterance, based on reducing the effort of utterance

Prosiopesis (from Ancient Greek προσιώπησις prosiṓpēsis 'becoming silent') is a term coined by Otto Jespersen for pronouncing a word or phrase without its initial sounds. Jespersen introduced the idea in Negation in English and Other Languages (1917):

. . . the phenomenon for which I venture to coin the term of prosiopesis (the opposite of what has been termed of old aposiopesis): the speaker begins to articulate, or thinks he begins to articulate, but produces no audible sound (either for want of expiration, or because he does not put his vocal chords in the proper position) till one or two syllables after the beginning of what he intended to say. The phenomenon is particularly frequent, and may become a regular speech-habit, in the case of certain set phrases, but may spread from these to other parts of the language.

Among the English examples Jespersen gives are (Good) morning, (I'm a)fraid not, and (The) fact is; among the French examples, (Est-ce) convenu?, (Par)faitement, and (Je ne me) rappelle plus.

He also introduces it in The Philosophy of Grammar (1924): "[P]rosiopesis . . . sometimes becomes habitual in certain stock exclamations like Thank you | [German] danke | [German] bitte | Bless you | Confound it! Cf. also Hope I'm not boring you."

This is similar to aposiopesis, where the ending of a sentence is deliberately excluded. David Crystal writes, "In rhetorical terminology, an elision in word-INITIAL position was known as aphaeresis or prosiopesis, in word-MEDIAL position was known as syncope, and in word-FINAL position as apocope." (Richard A. Lanham similarly defines aphaeresis more narrowly than Jespersen defines prosiopesis, a term that Lanham does not mention.)

Other synonyms include aphesis, procope, and truncation.

Prosiopesis and aposiopesis are studied as sources of interjections.
