= Christian clothing =

Dress codes among Christian worshippers

Many Christians have followed certain dress codes during attendance at church. Customs have varied over time and among different Christian denominations. As with the Bible, the Church Fathers of Christianity taught modesty as a core principle guiding the clothing that Christians are to manufacture and wear.

== Clothing Worn During Religious Services ==
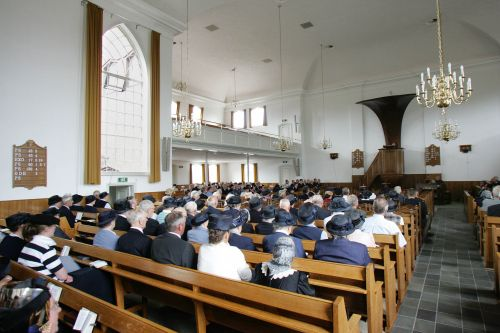
Christian headcovering and modesty being practiced in a Restored Reformed Church in Doornspijk, Gelderland (the Netherlands)

In some Christian communities, the term "Sunday best" refers to the tradition of saving one's finest clothing for Sunday services. In some communities, churches served as the main social center for local residents. As such, dressing in fine clothing for religious services was often dictated by a need to project status and influence among peers. Many Christians reject this practice and instead encourage modest, respectful dress not only for Sunday worship, but in everyday life (cf. outward holiness). For example, Methodists in the conservative holiness movement teach with respect to modesty that before the fall of man, "Nakedness was 'very good' from the beginning, but its innocence was corrupted by the fall", a concept taught in Genesis 1:31 and Genesis 2:25. Genesis 3:8–10 and Revelation 16:15 teach that after the fall of man, "publicly exposed nakedness is a symbol of the shame of sin." In Genesis 3:7, Adam and Eve tried to cover their nakedness, though their attempt was inadequate for God; this, according to Holiness Methodist theology, reflects the tendency in humans to "invent inadequate coverings for our nakedness." Genesis 3:21 and Revelation 3:18 teach that Jehovah properly clothed humans and that a "fully-clothed person is a God-ordained symbol of the full clothing of Christ's righteousness." Exodus 20:26 and Exodus 28:42–43 teach that nakedness is inclusive of anything that includes the torso and thighs; as such Christians of the Holiness Methodist tradition wear pants or dresses that go beyond the knees, as well as shirts that do not expose the underarms.

Conservative Anabaptist denominations, such as the Dunkard Brethren Church, observe the wearing of plain dress, because Jesus “condemned anxious thought for raiment” in Matthew 6:25–33 and Luke 12:22–31. They teach that the wearing of plain dress is scripturally commanded in 1 Timothy 2:9–10, 1 Peter 3:3–5, and 1 Corinthians 11:5–6, in addition to being taught by the early Church Fathers. Indeed, in the early Christian manual Paedagogus, the injunction for clothing to extend past the knees was enjoined. With the adjective kosmios (κόσμιος) meaning "modest", 1 Timothy 2:9–10 uses the Greek word catastola katastolé (καταστολῇ) for the apparel suitable for Christian females, and for this reason, women belonging to Conservative Anabaptist denominations often wear a cape dress with a headcovering; for example, ladies who are members of the Charity Christian Fellowship wear the cape dress with an opaque hanging veil as the denomination teaches that "the sisters are to wear a double layered garment as the Greek word 'catastola' describes."

Many Christian traditions encourage or require adherents to don clothing of religious significance during church services (and in the public), such as a headcovering, a practice enjoined by Paul in the Bible (1 Corinthians 11:2–6). As such, the wearing of headcoverings by women, continually, is enjoined in Anabaptist Christian denominations, as well while attending services in some Reformed, Plymouth Brethren, Oriental Orthodox and Eastern Orthodox communities. Some Catholic, Lutheran, Anglican, Methodist and non-denominational Christian women also choose to cover their heads for worship. Some Christian holy days incorporate traditional clothing, such as the Easter bonnet. Christians' clothing has, however, evolved over time, particularly following the migration of Christian population to distant lands during the Age of Enlightenment. This was caused by the interactions of the Christians with natives, as many families attempted to integrate with the societies they were living in.

In recent decades, some churches have encouraged a more informal dress code. Among the first to adopt this policy were the Calvary Chapel associated churches. Many clergy members, especially those in denominations and religious groups formed in the 20th century, have abandoned the traditional robes and vestments in favor of business casual clothing. This change was made to close the perceived gap between the clergy and laypersons. Some even wear jeans and other everyday casual wear if the members have chosen to dress casual as well. Though a small minority, Christian naturists take this one step further, and wear no clothing at all, which they see as "God's design".

== See also ==
- Religious clothing – including further information on Christian religious clothing
