= Headscarf =

Piece of cloth worn on one's head

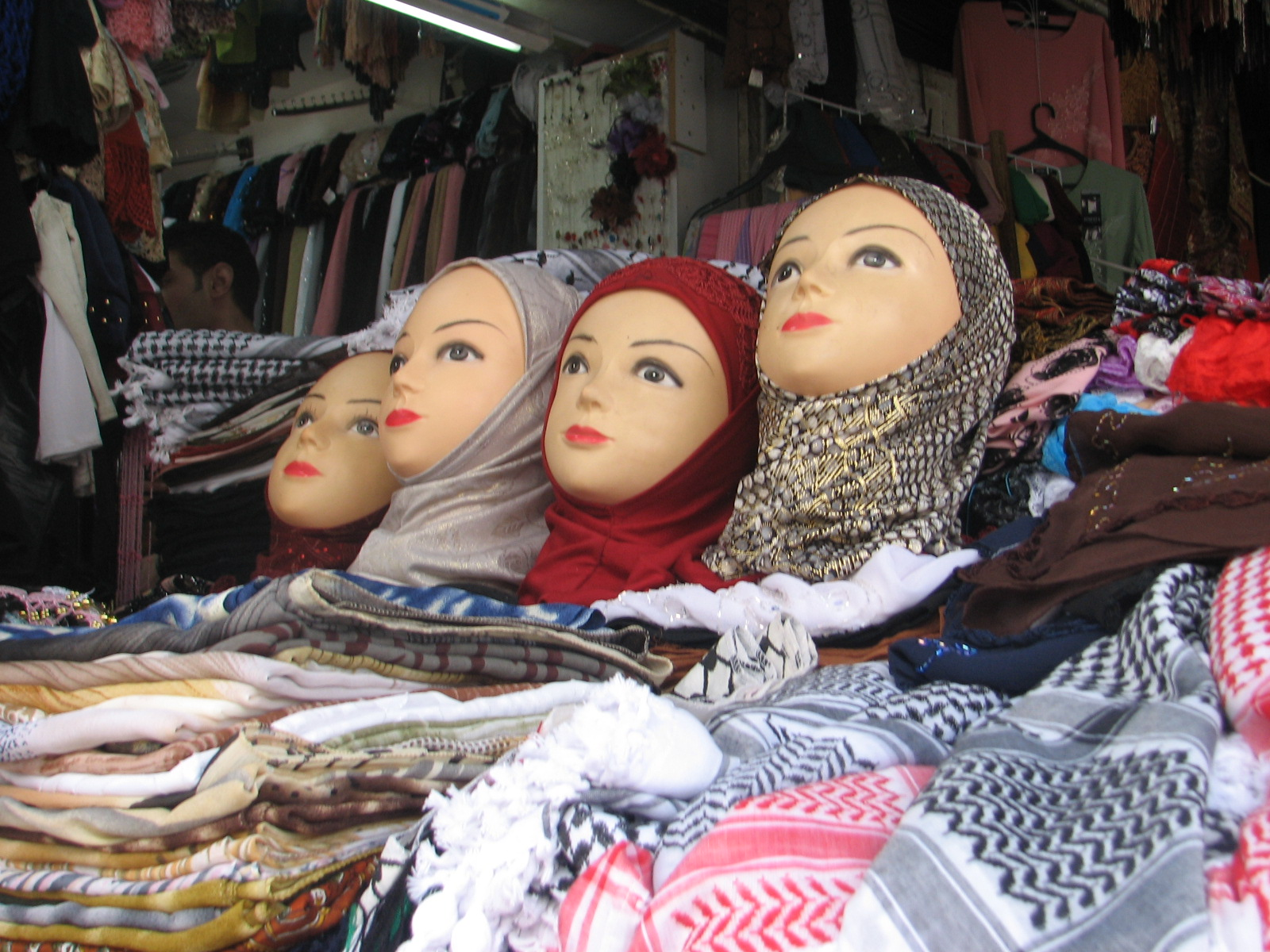
Women's headscarves for sale in Damascus

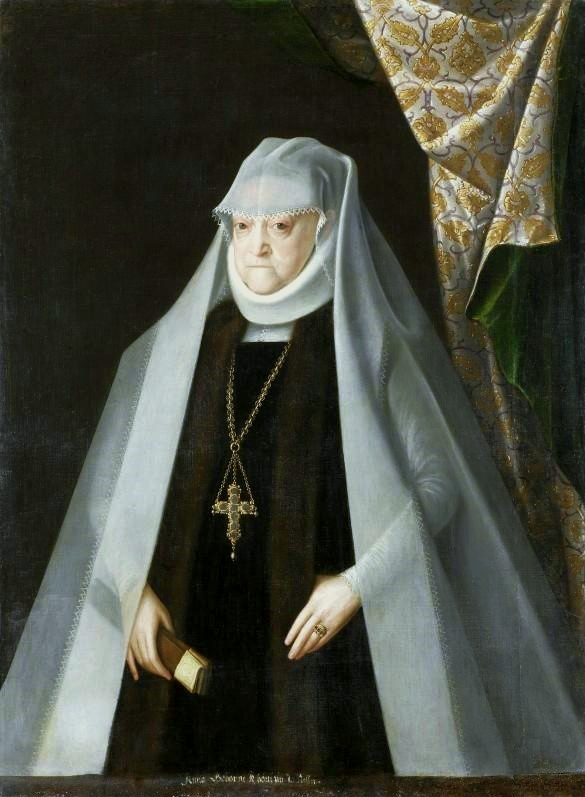
In Christian cultures, nuns and widows often covered their bodies and hair. Here, widowed Queen Anna of Poland wears a 16th-century wimple with a veil and a ruff around her neck.

A headscarf is a scarf covering most or all of the top of a person's, usually women's, hair and head, leaving the face uncovered. A headscarf is formed of a triangular cloth or a square cloth folded into a triangle, with which the head is covered.

== Purposes ==
Elizabeth II wearing a headscarf with Ronald Reagan, 1982

Headscarves may be worn for a variety of purposes, such as protection of the head or hair from rain, wind, dirt, cold, warmth, for sanitation, for fashion, recognition or social distinction; with religious significance, to hide baldness, out of modesty, or other forms of social convention. Headscarves are now mainly worn for practical, cultural or religious reasons.

Until the latter 20th century, headscarves were commonly worn by women in many parts of Europe, Southwestern Asia, North Africa, and the Americas, as well as some other parts of the world. In recent decades, headscarves, like hats, have fallen out of favor in Western culture. They are still, though, common in most of the Islamic world, as well as in the Indian subcontinent and many rural areas of Eastern Europe.

A form of headscarf, known as the hijab, is traditionally worn in Islamic societies, and is born out of long-standing gendered modesty conventions within the Islamic faith. It is worn by many Muslim women who consider it to be a religious ordainment, and its style varies by culture. There are, however, some Muslims who do not believe that the hijab in the context of head covering is a religious ordainment in the Quran.

Historically, Christian women also maintained a similar practice of covering the head and hair. The Christian Bible, in 1 Corinthians 11:4–13, enjoins women to wear a head covering. Among Anabaptist Christians, this often takes the form of a Kapp or hanging veil—being worn throughout the day. For Eastern Orthodox Christians, headscarves are traditionally worn by women while attending the church, and historically, in public as well. However, in certain localities, this has waned.

Among the Igbo people of southeastern Nigeria, scarves are known as the ichafu (also rendered ichafu isi or akisi).

=== Religious use ===
Headscarves may specifically have a religious significance or function, or be expected as a matter of social custom, the two very often being confused.

==== Islam ====
According to some, it is the "khimar" mentioned in the Quran. Many of these garments cover the hair, ears and throat, but do not cover the face. There are some Muslims who do not believe that the hijab in the context of head-covering is a religious ordainment in the Quran.

The keffiyeh is commonly used by Muslims in Middle Eastern countries.

Headscarves and veils are traditionally worn by Muslim women and girls in order that no one has the right to view her beauty except her Mahrams. For women, the Muslim religious dress varies, and various cultures include hijab, burqa, chador, niqab, dupatta, or other types of hijab, though not all Muslim women observe the practice.

==== Judaism ====
Judaism, under Halakhah (Jewish Law), promotes modest dress among women and men. Many married Orthodox Jewish women wear a headscarf (mitpahat or tichel), snood, turban, shpitzel or a wig to cover their hair. The Tallit is commonly worn by Jewish men, especially for prayers, which they use to cover their heads in order to recite the blessings, although not all men do this. It also may not apply to the entire prayer service, sometimes only specific sections such as the Amidah. The Kohanim (priests) also cover their heads and shoulders with the tallit during the priestly blessing, so as to conform to Halakah which states that the hands of the priests should not be seen during this time as their mystical significance to the hand position.

The custom of Jewish women to wear headscarves is an old custom, learnt from the Torah (Numbers 5:18) where a suspected adulteress is paraded before a priest and her head covering is removed. By saying that the 'hair of the woman's head [shall] go loose' is to imply that she was wearing a head covering. Jewish orthodox law allows for a man to divorce his wife if she goes out in public places with her head uncovered.

==== Christianity ====
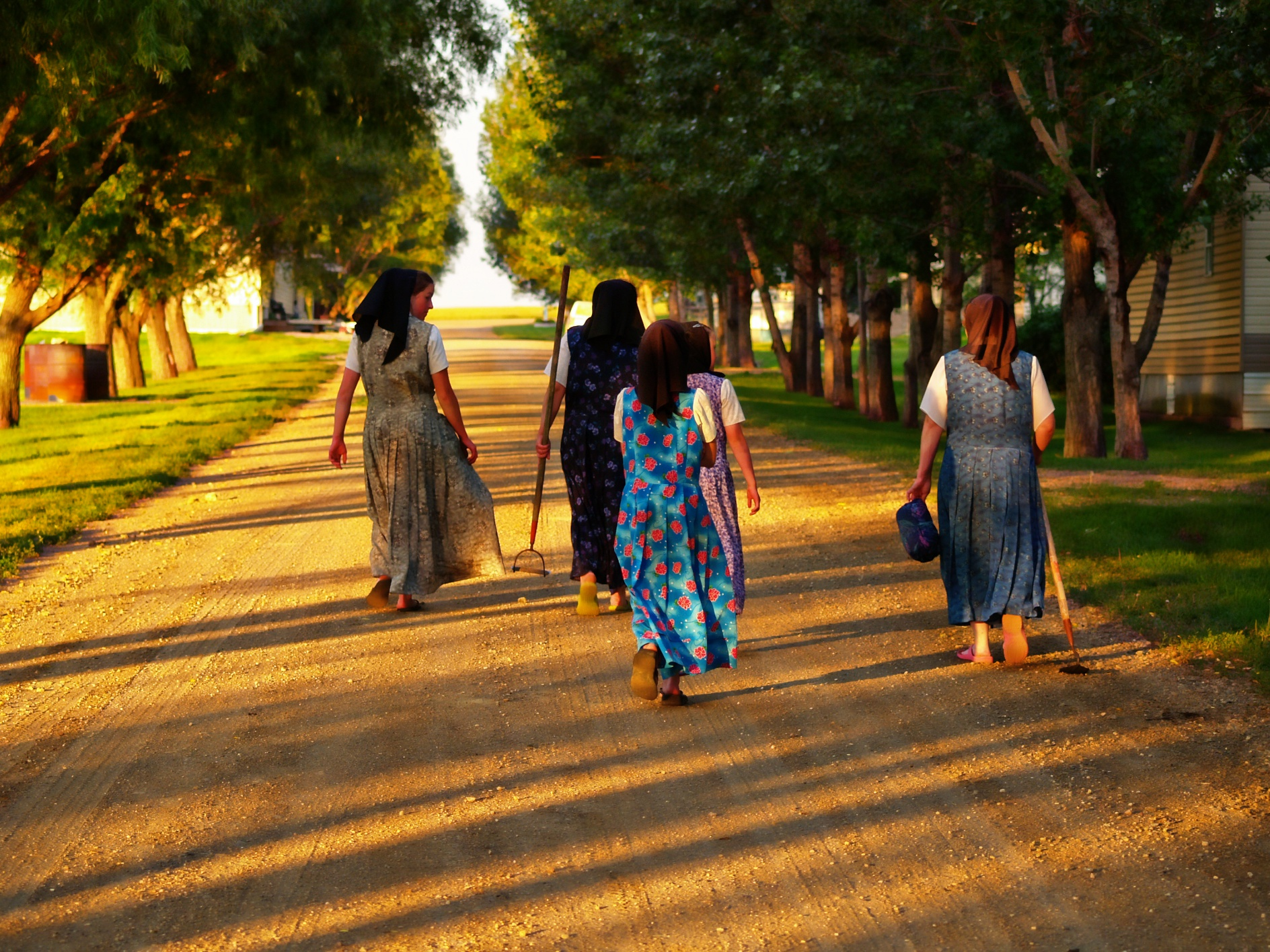
Hutterite Anabaptist Christian women wearing headscarves

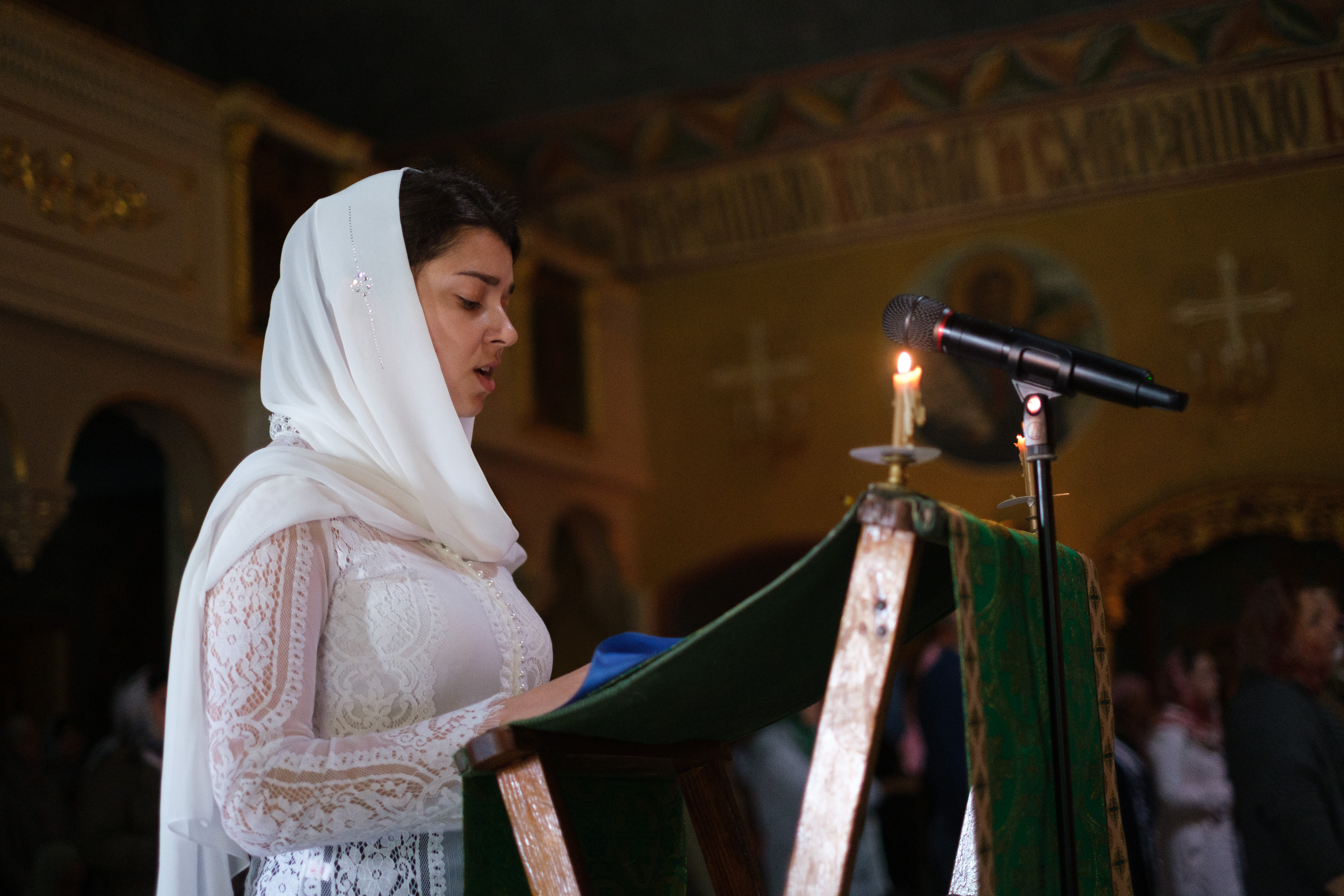
A Christian woman in Russia wearing a shawl while reading the Bible

The Bible, in 1 Corinthians 11:4–13, instructs women to wear a head covering, while men are to pray and worship with their heads uncovered. In the early Church, Christian head-covering with an opaque cloth veil was universally taught by the Church Fathers and practiced by Christian women. The practice continues in many parts of the world, such as Romania, Russia, Ukraine, Ethiopia, India, Pakistan, and South Korea.

The Early Church Father John Chrysostom (c. 347 – 407) delineated Saint Paul's teaching, explaining that Paul said a man praying with a head covering "dishonoureth his head", while Christian women should always wear a cloth head covering. Paul compared a woman not wearing a veil to her being shaven, which Chrysostom stated is "always dishonourable".

The Church Fathers taught that because the hair of a woman has sexual potency, it should only be for her husband to see and covered the rest of the time. To some extent, the covering of the head depended on where the woman was, but it was usually outside and on formal occasions, especially when praying at home and worshipping in church. Certain styles of Christian head coverings were an indication of married status; the "matron's cap" is a general term for these.

Many Anabaptist Christian women (Amish/Para-Amish, Schwarzenau Brethren, Bruderhof, Hutterites, River Brethren, Apostolic Christians, Charity Christians and Mennonites) wear their headscarf at all times, except when sleeping; these head coverings are usually in the form of a hanging veil or kapp.

In countries with large Eastern Orthodox Christian population such as Romania or Russia headscarves and veils are used by Christian women in the Eastern Orthodox Church, Oriental Orthodox Church, Assyrian Church of the East, and Roman Catholic Church.

The Roman Catholic Church required all women to wear a head covering over their hair in church until the 1980s; in Spain, these take the form of the mantilla. Women meeting the Pope in formal audiences are still expected to wear them. Martin Luther, the German Reformer, as well as John Calvin, a major figure in the Reformed Churches, also expected women to cover their heads in church, as did John Wesley, the founder of the Methodist Churches.

In many rural areas, women, especially widows, continue to observe the traditional Christian custom of head-covering, especially in the Mediterranean, as well as in eastern and southern Europe; in South Asia, it is common for Christian women to wear a head covering called a dupatta. At times the styles of covering using simple cloth became very elaborate, with complicated layers and folding, held in place with hair pins. Among the many terms for head-coverings made of flexible cloth are wimple, hennin, kerchief, gable hood, as well as light hats, mob caps and bonnets. Some English speakers use the word "babushka" (the word for "grandma" or "elderly woman" in Russian: бaбушка) to indicate a headscarf tied below the chin, as still commonly worn in rural parts of Europe.

== In popular culture ==
In the modern era, persons may choose to wear a headscarf for religious, moral, or practical reasons.

Hilda Ogden, popular character from the UK soap opera Coronation Street portrayed by Jean Alexander, became famous throughout the nation for combining a headscarf with hair curlers. She became so famous that, in 1982, she came fourth behind the Queen Mother, Queen Elizabeth II, and Diana, Princess of Wales in a poll of the most recognisable women in Britain.

== Image gallery ==
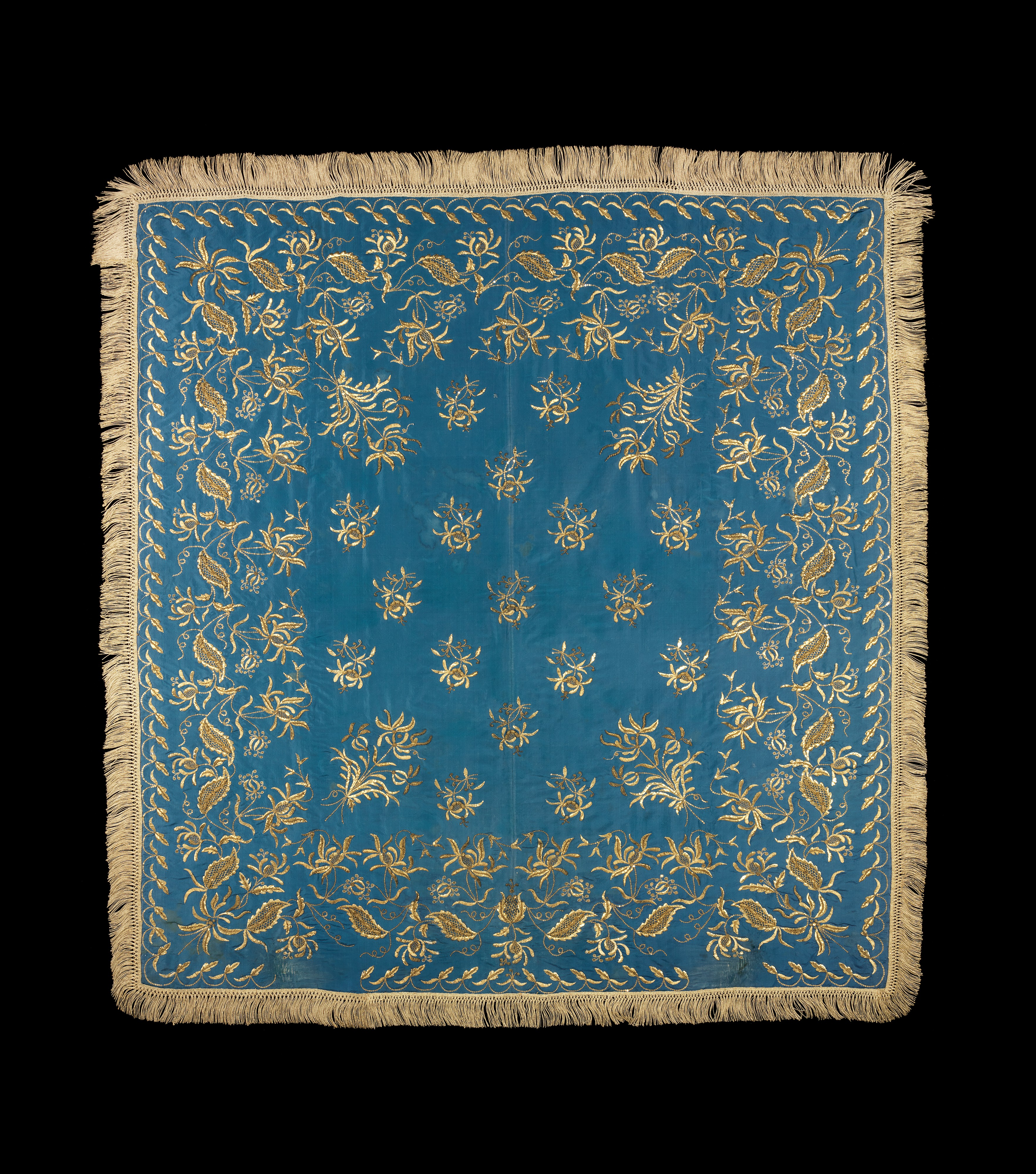
An early 19th-century Russian silk embroidered headscarf

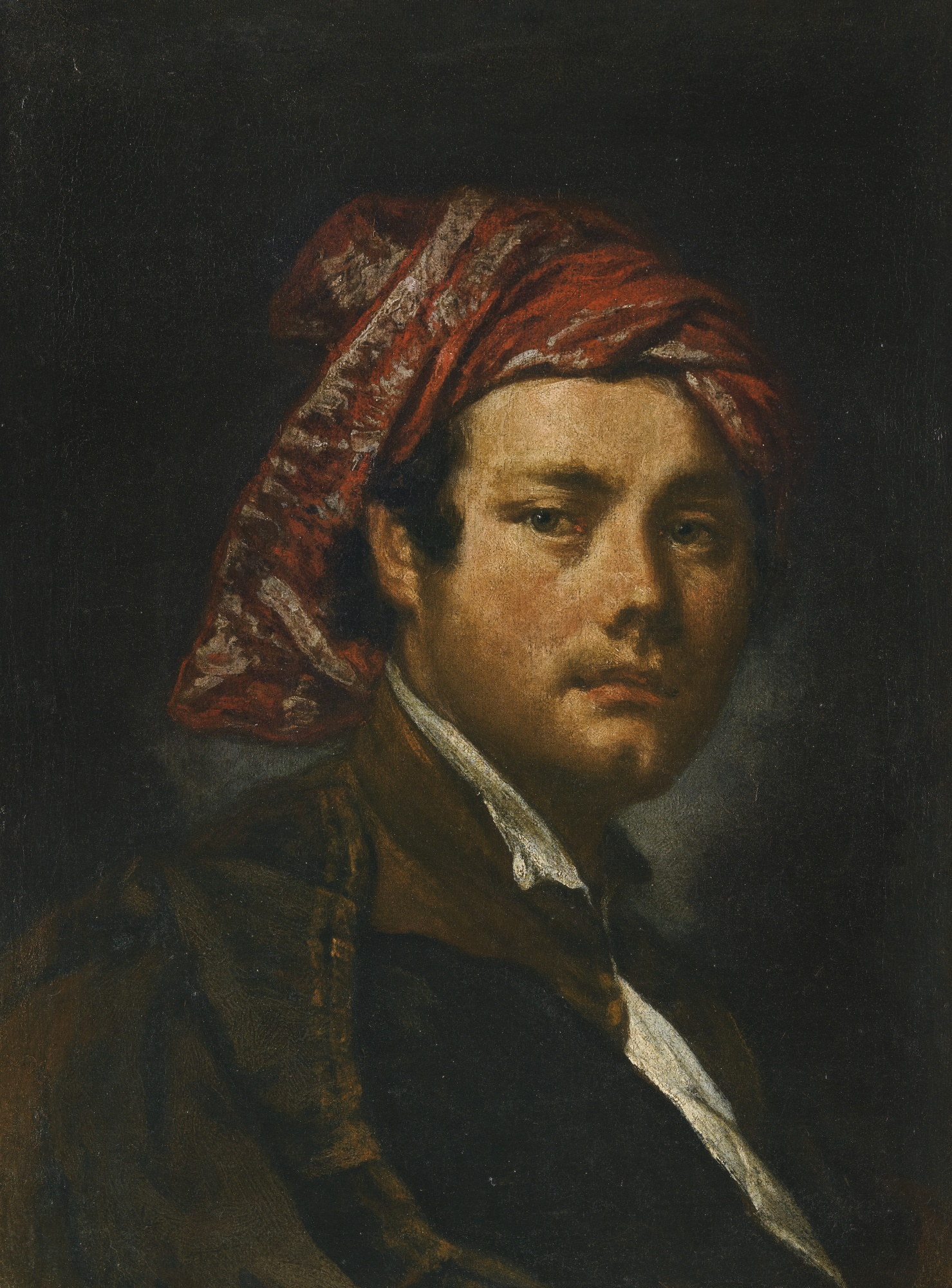
Oil on canvas painting by Vittore Ghislandi, called Fra Galgario

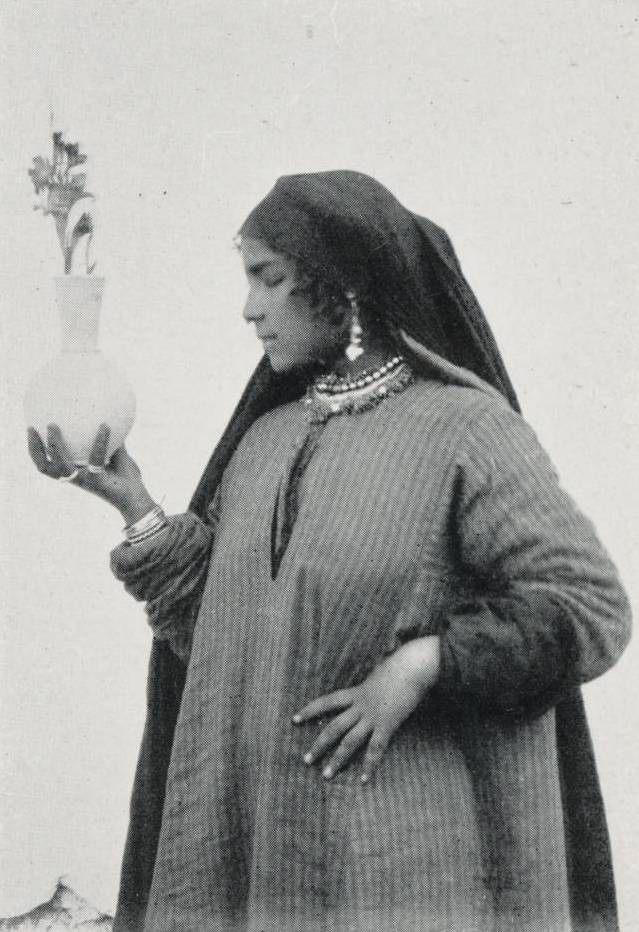
A woman selling flowers in Egypt, 1906

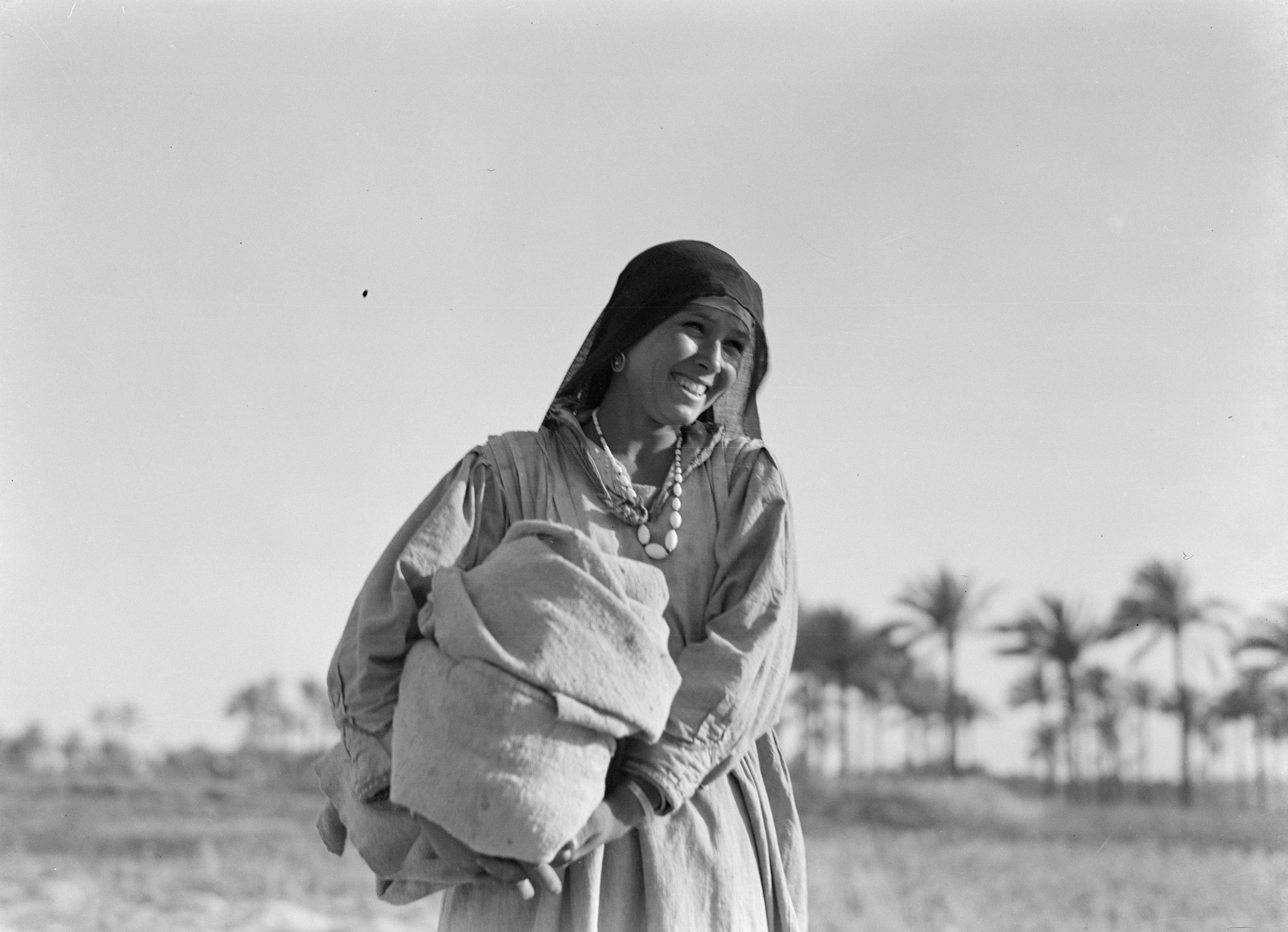
Egypt, 1935

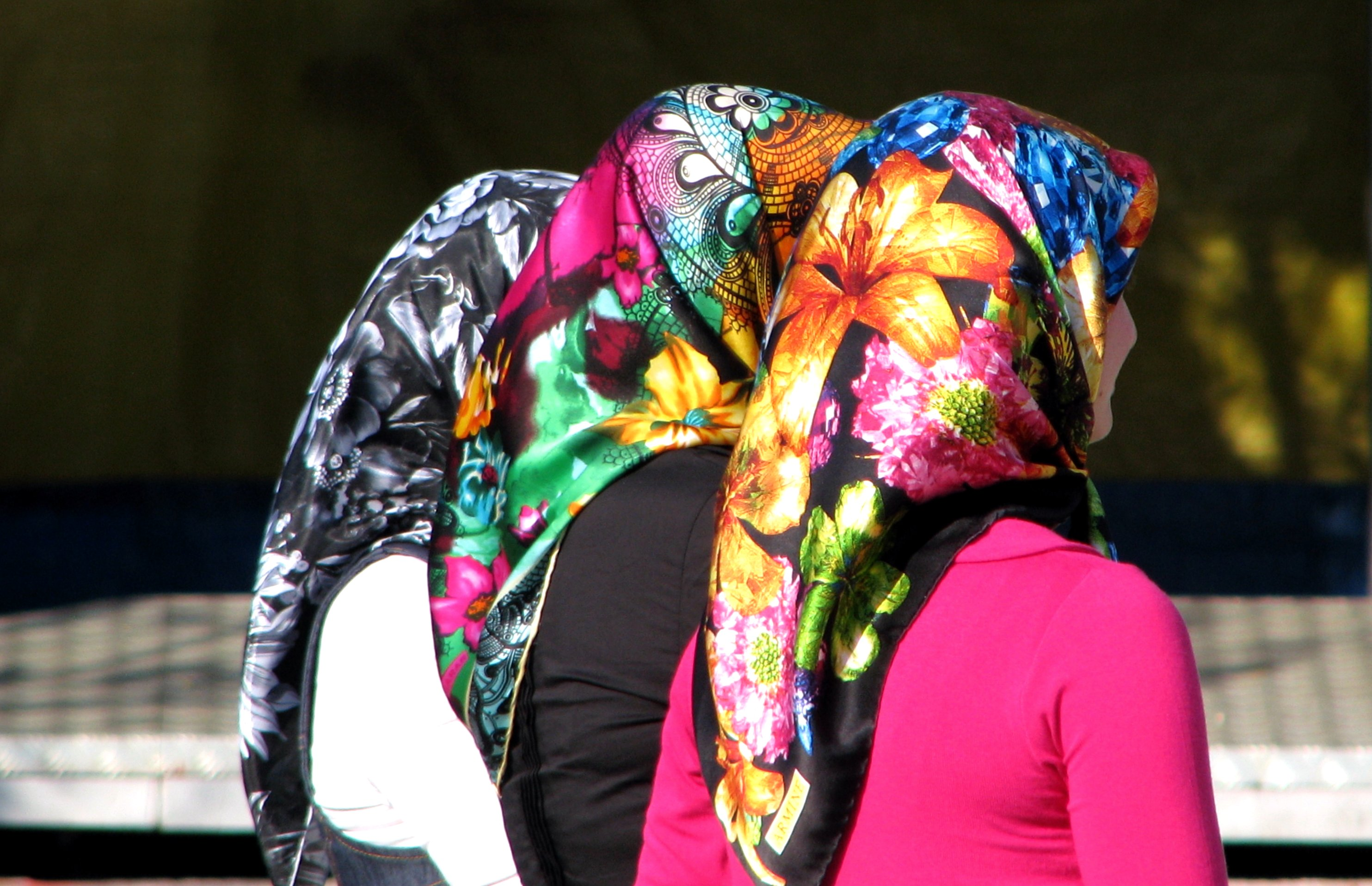
Women with headscarves in Alanya, Turkey

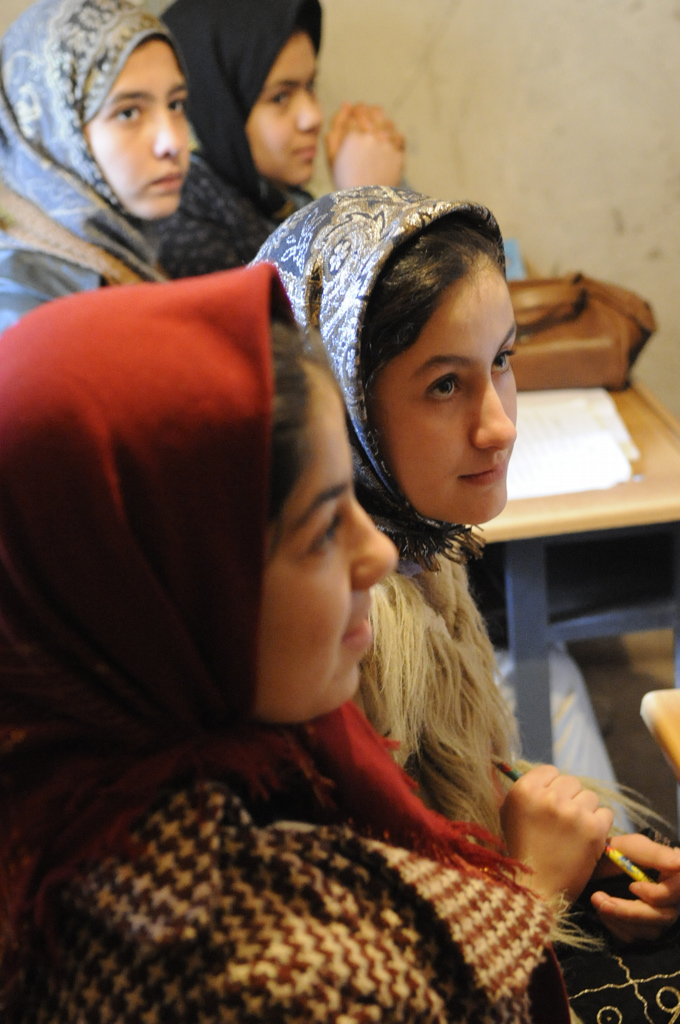
School girls in Herat, Afghanistan

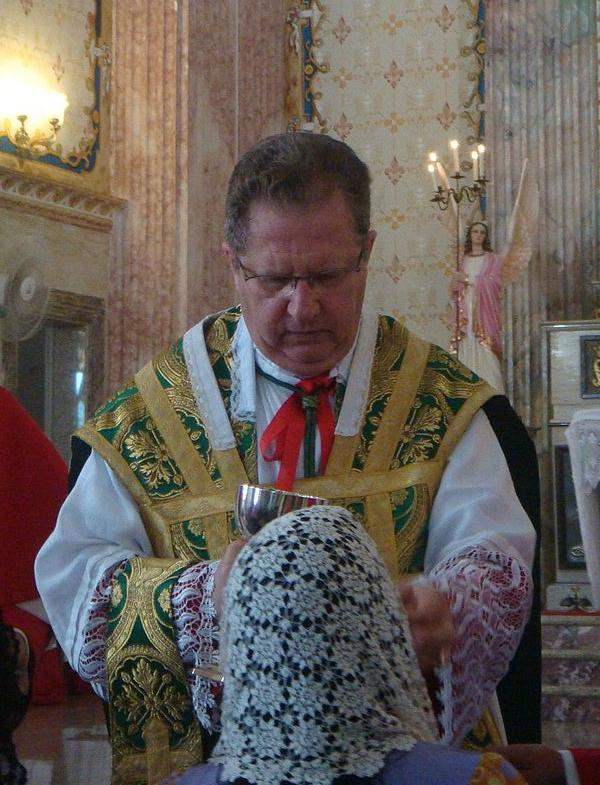
At a Tridentine Mass, women typically wear a headcovering.

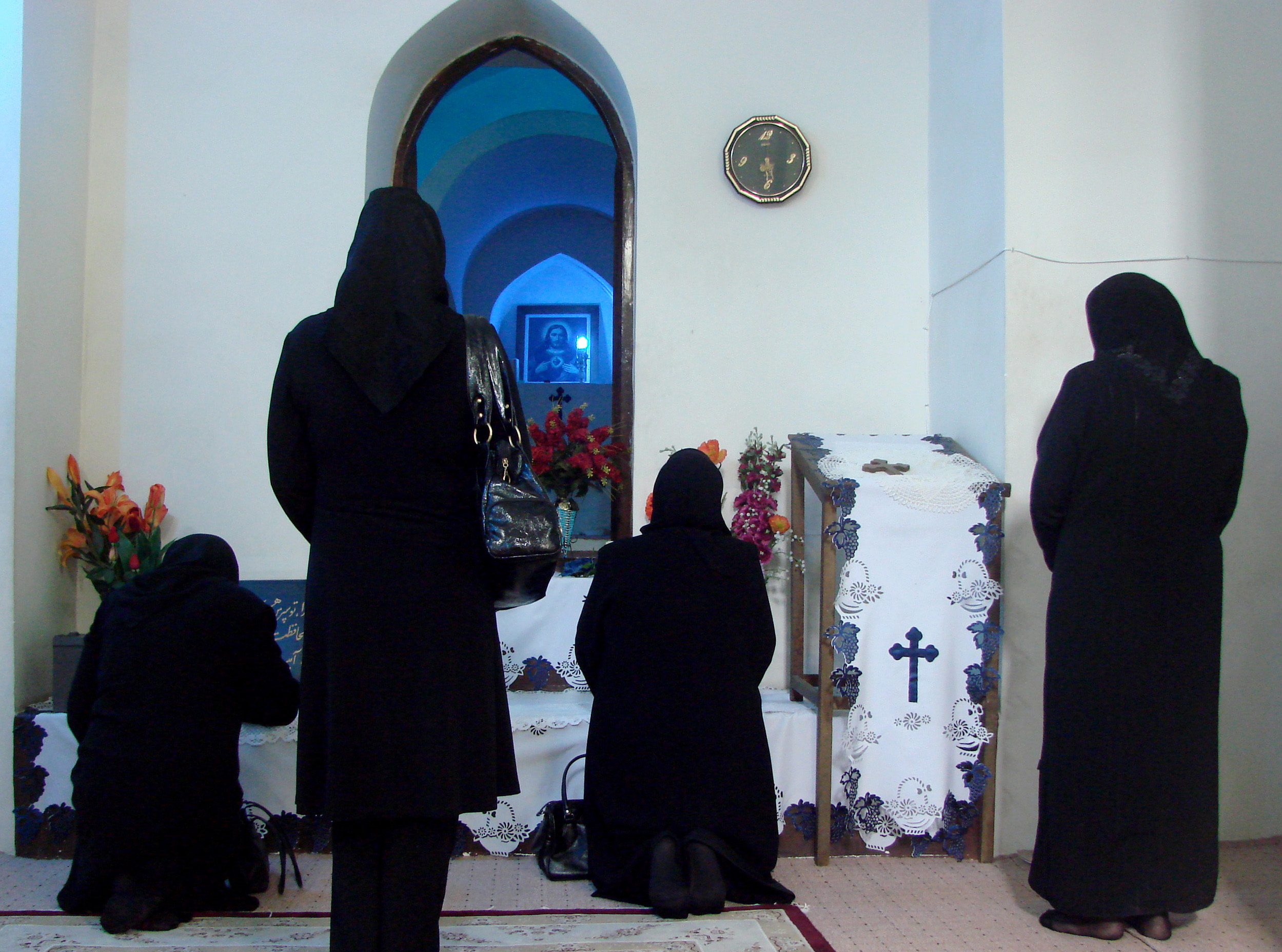
Assyrian Christian women wearing headcoverings and modest clothing praying in Mart Maryam Church in Urmia, Iran

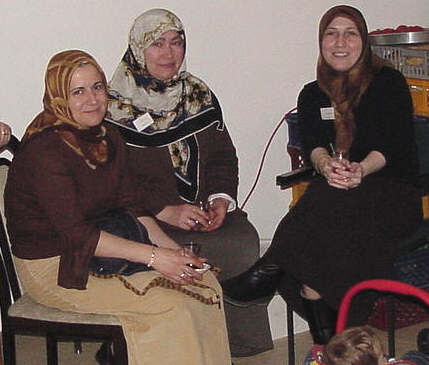
Three Turkish women wearing headscarves, 2003

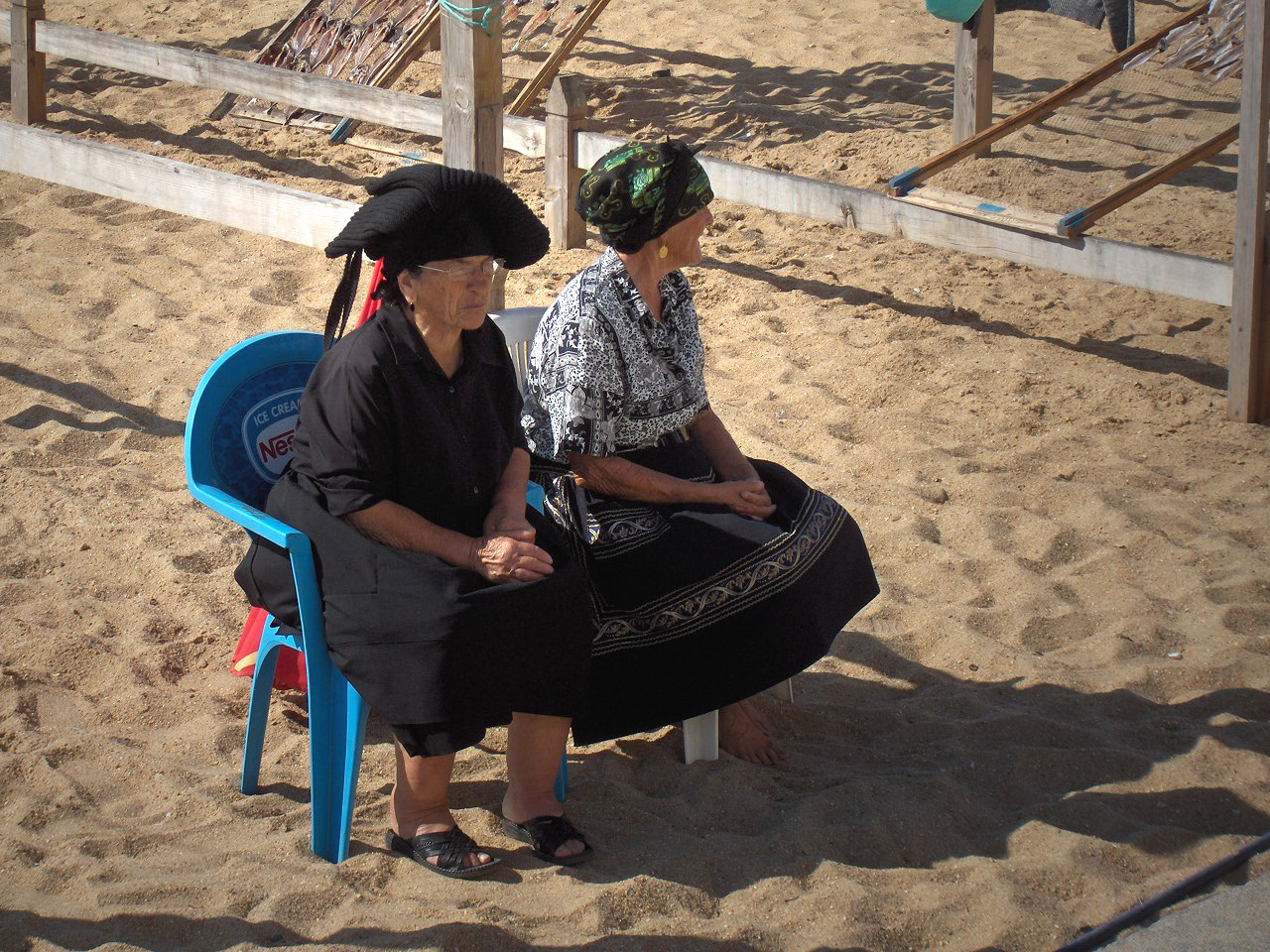
Women typical dress and headscarf; Nazaré, Portugal, 2006

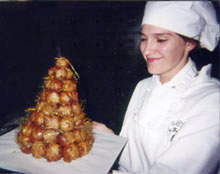
A headscarf for chefs; Los Angeles, 2007

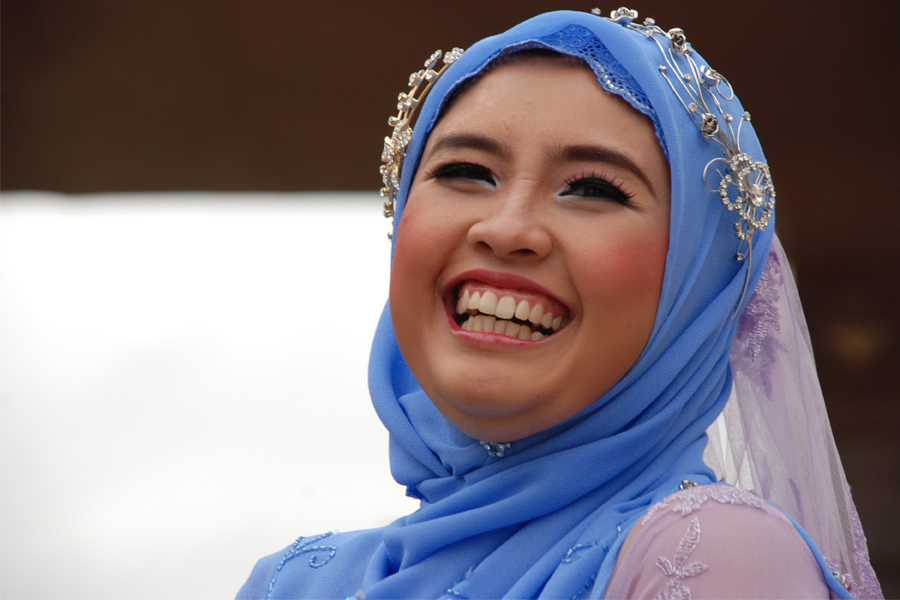
Laughing woman in Kuala Lumpur wearing a blue headscarf, 2008

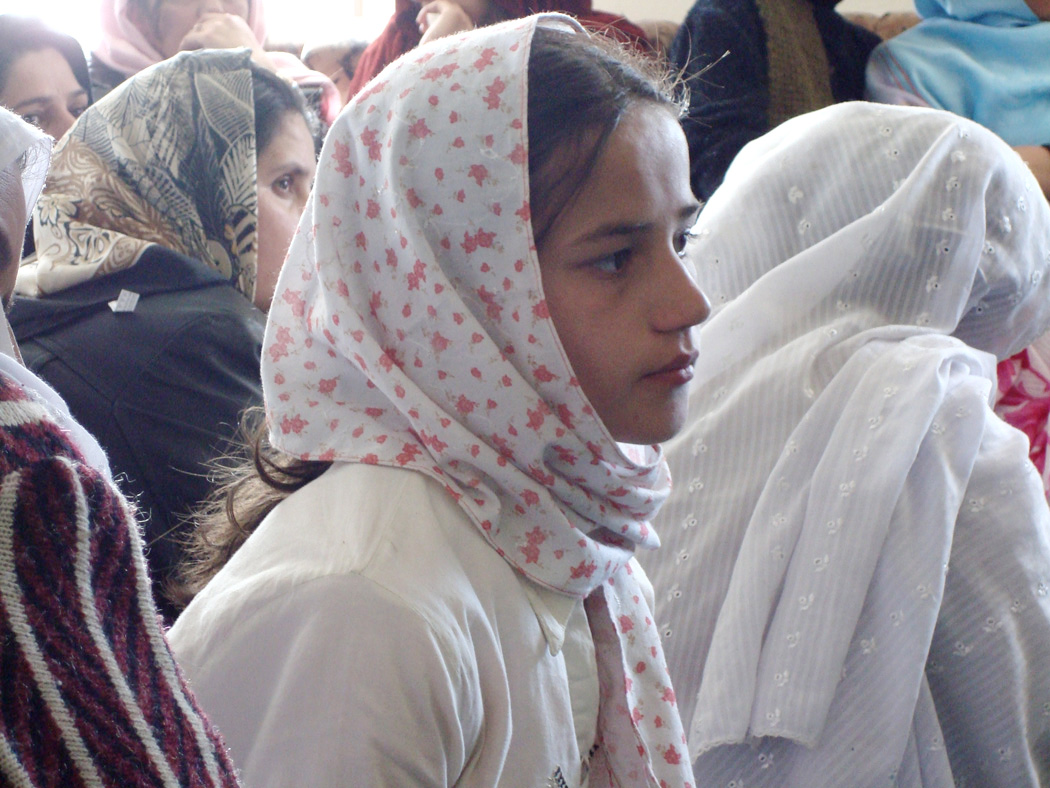
An Afghan girl wears an Islamic style scarf at the International Women's Day celebration in Pajshir in 2008.

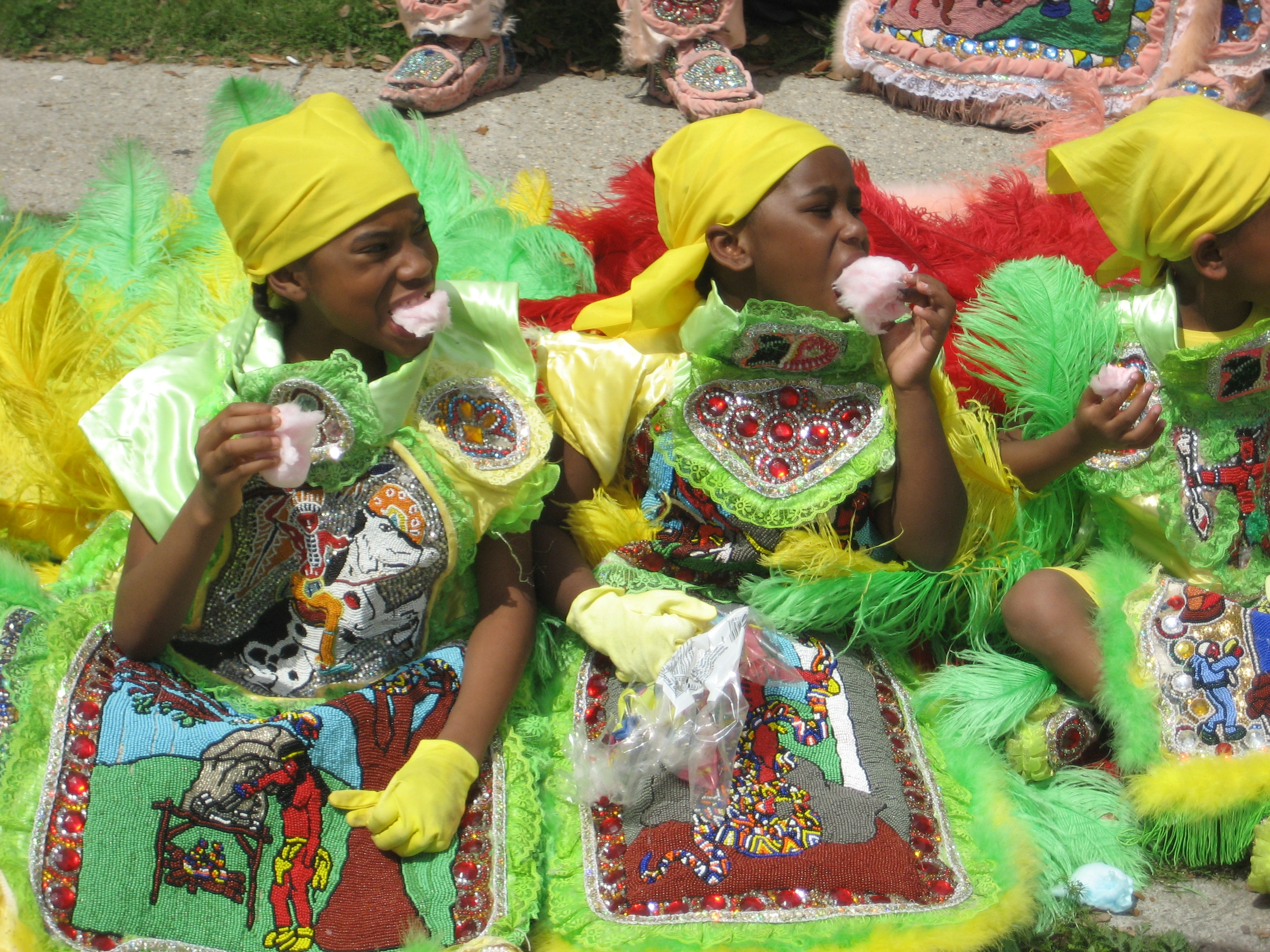
Girls dressed up for a parade wear matching yellow headscarves. 2009, New Orleans, Louisiana.

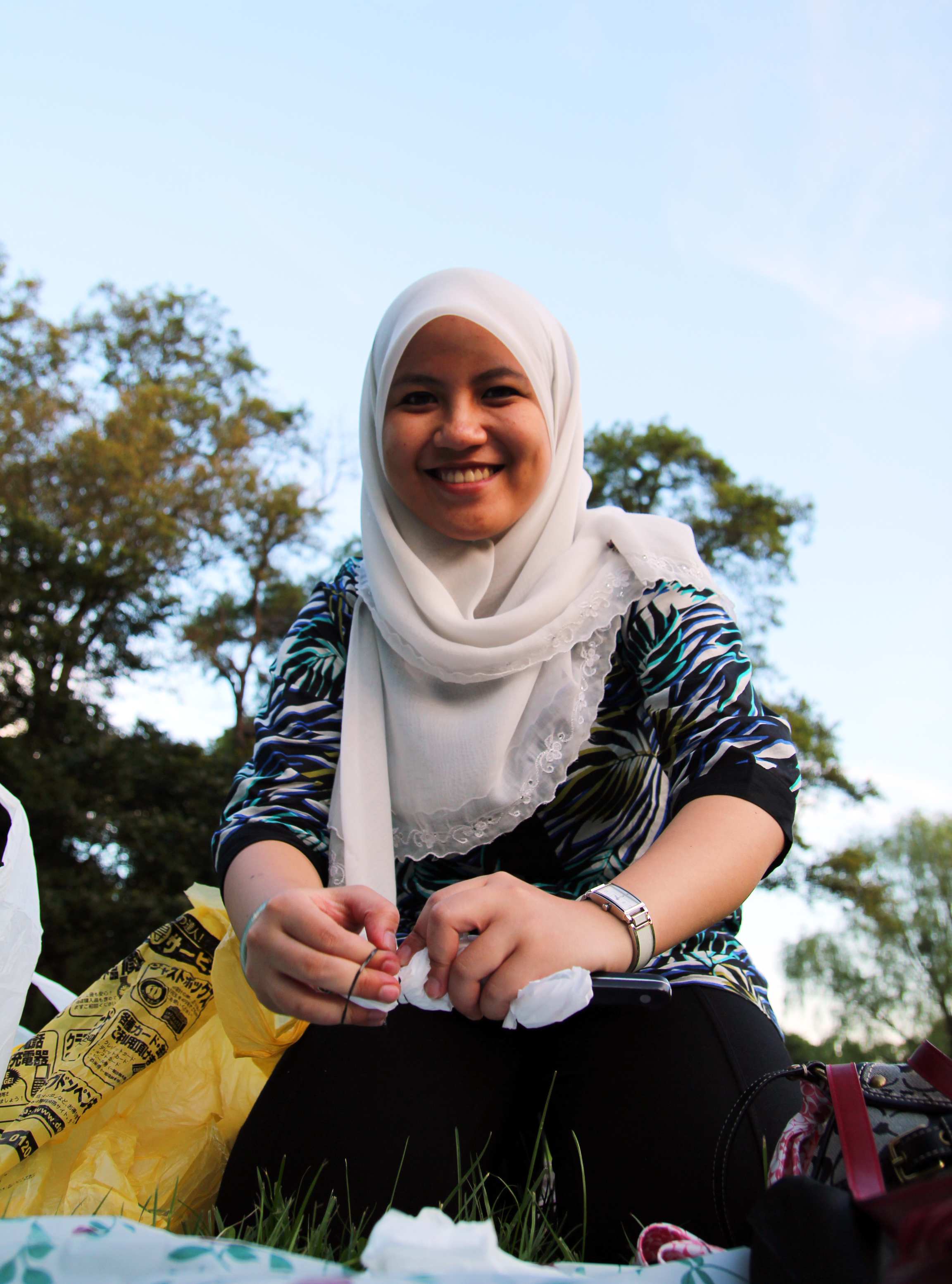
A Malaysian girl wearing a headscarf, 2010

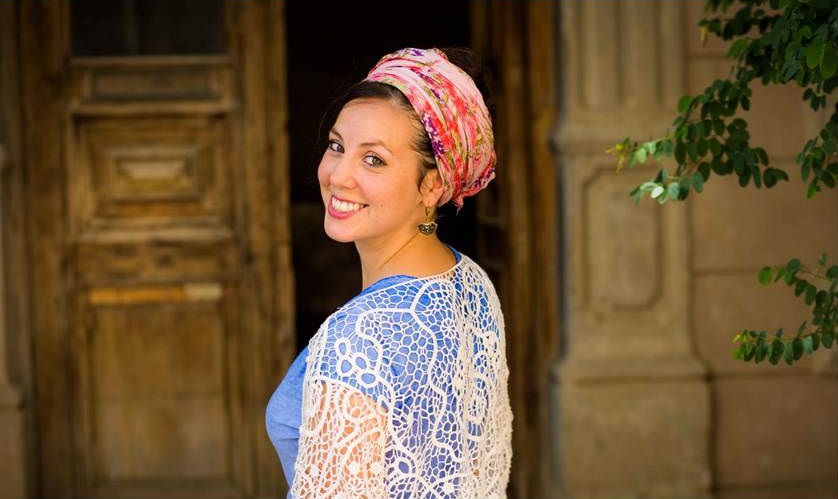
A Jewish woman wearing a headwrap

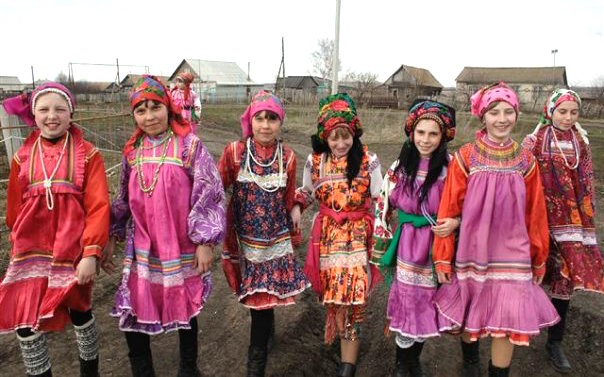
Scarved Moksha girls in traditional costumes

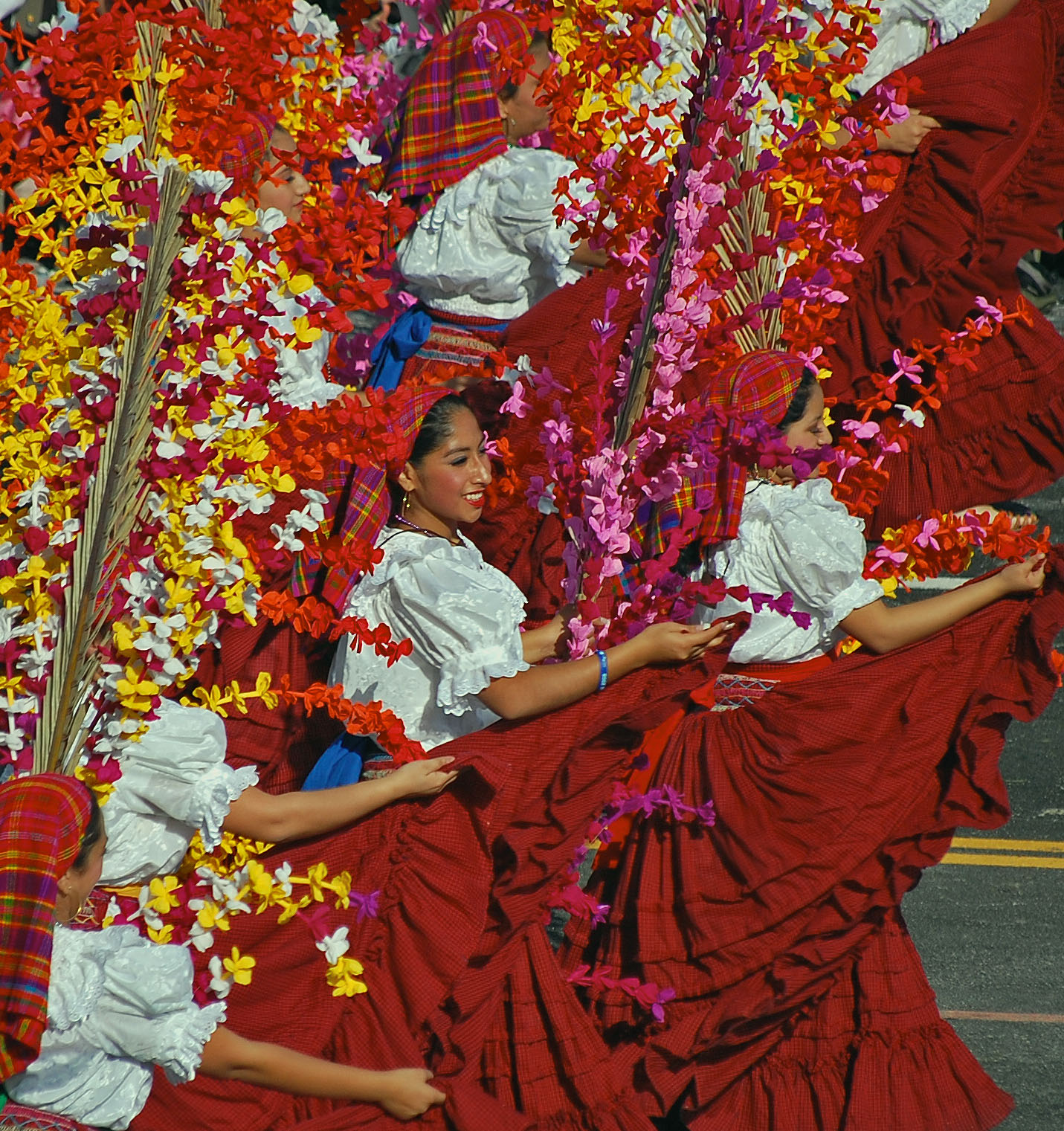
Salvadoran women wear distinctive regional veils for national celebrations.

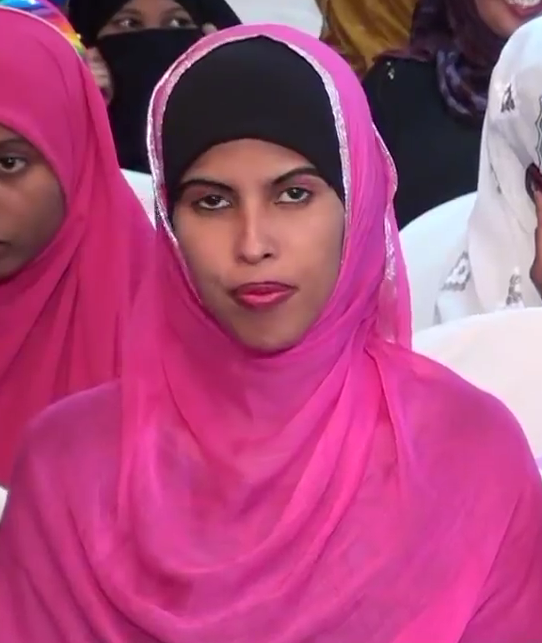
A young Somali woman in a traditional headscarf

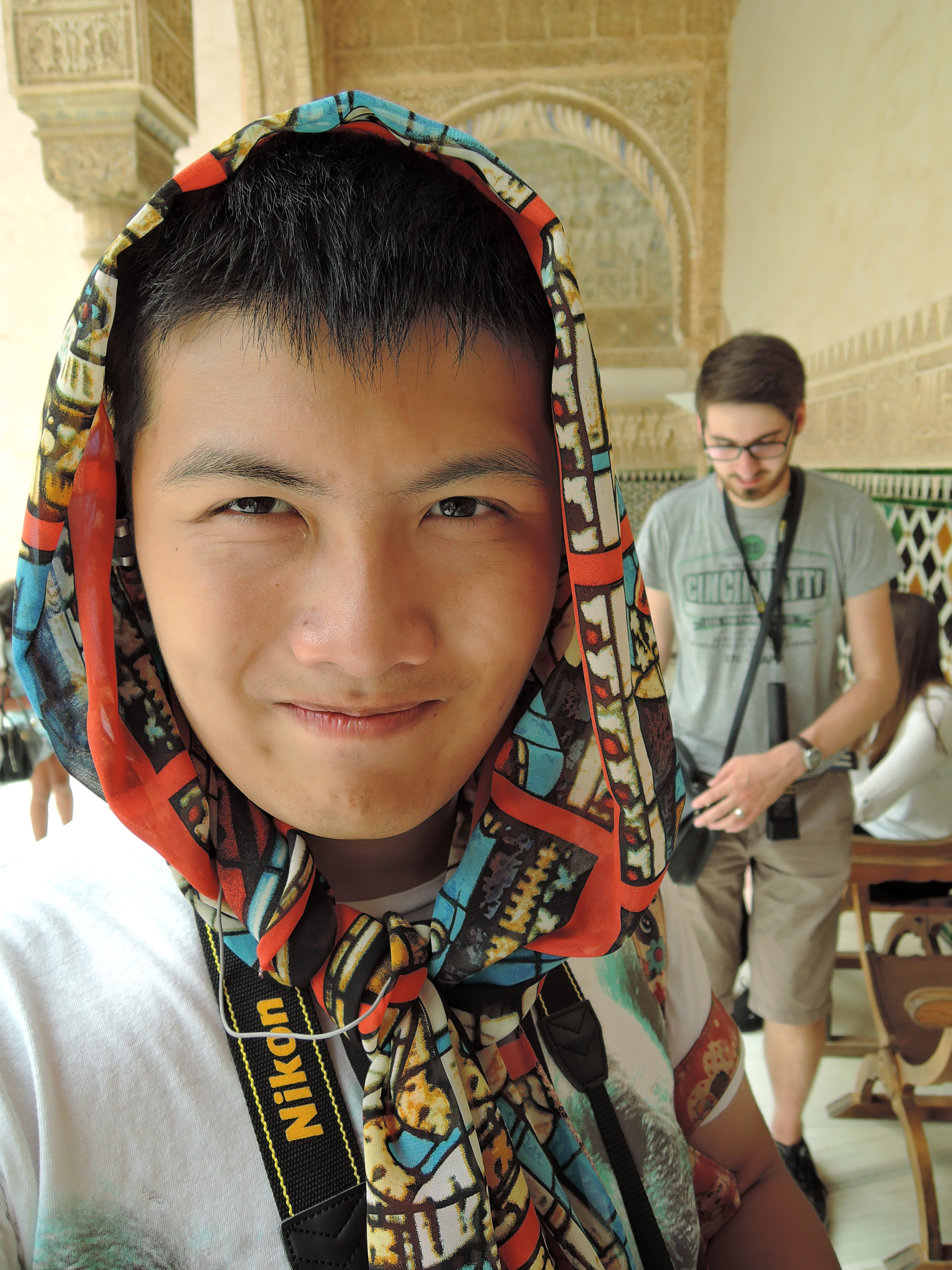
A Chinese man with headscarf in his fashion costume

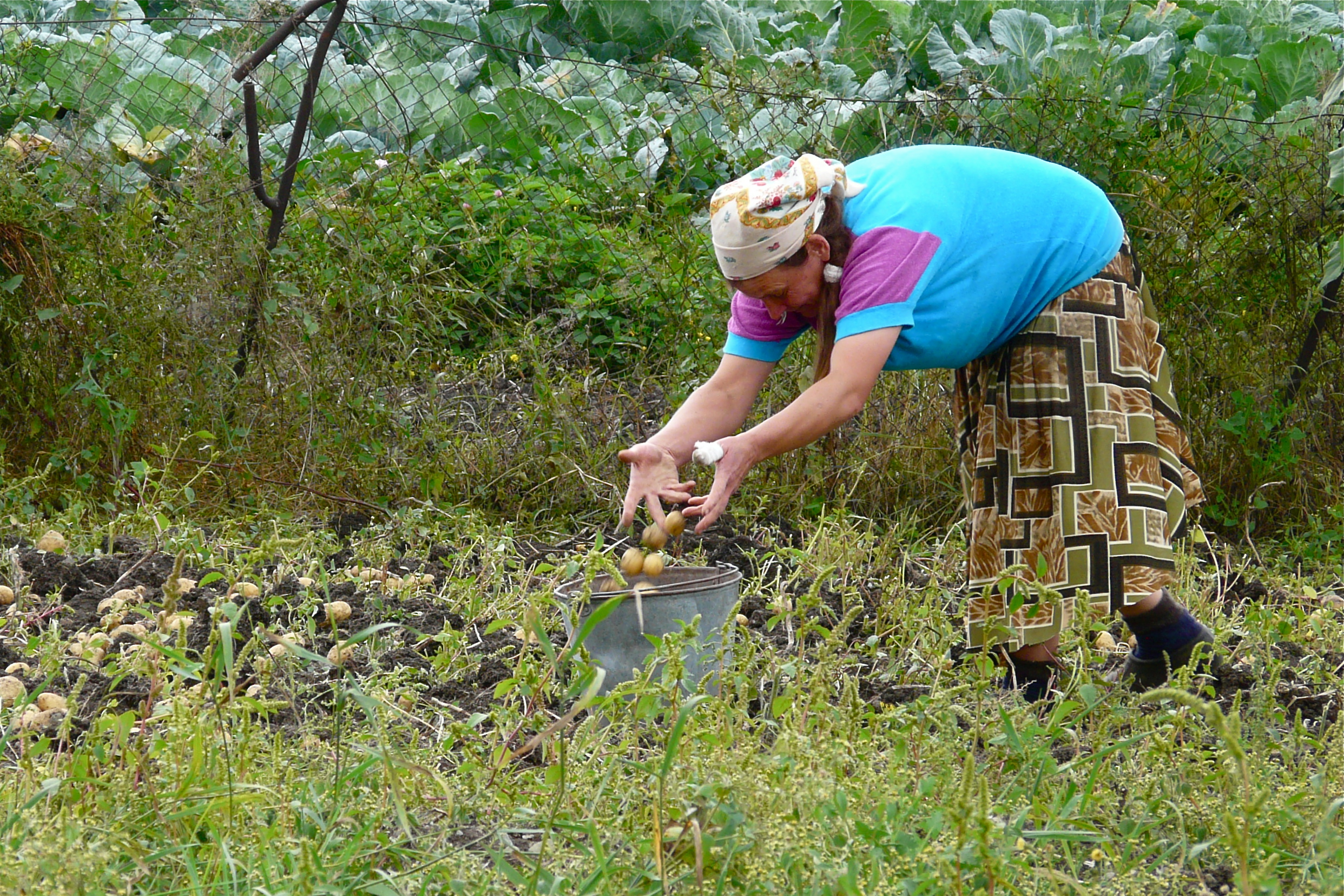
The Molokans (Russian: Молока́не) are a religious sect that broke away from the Russian Orthodox Church in the 1550s.

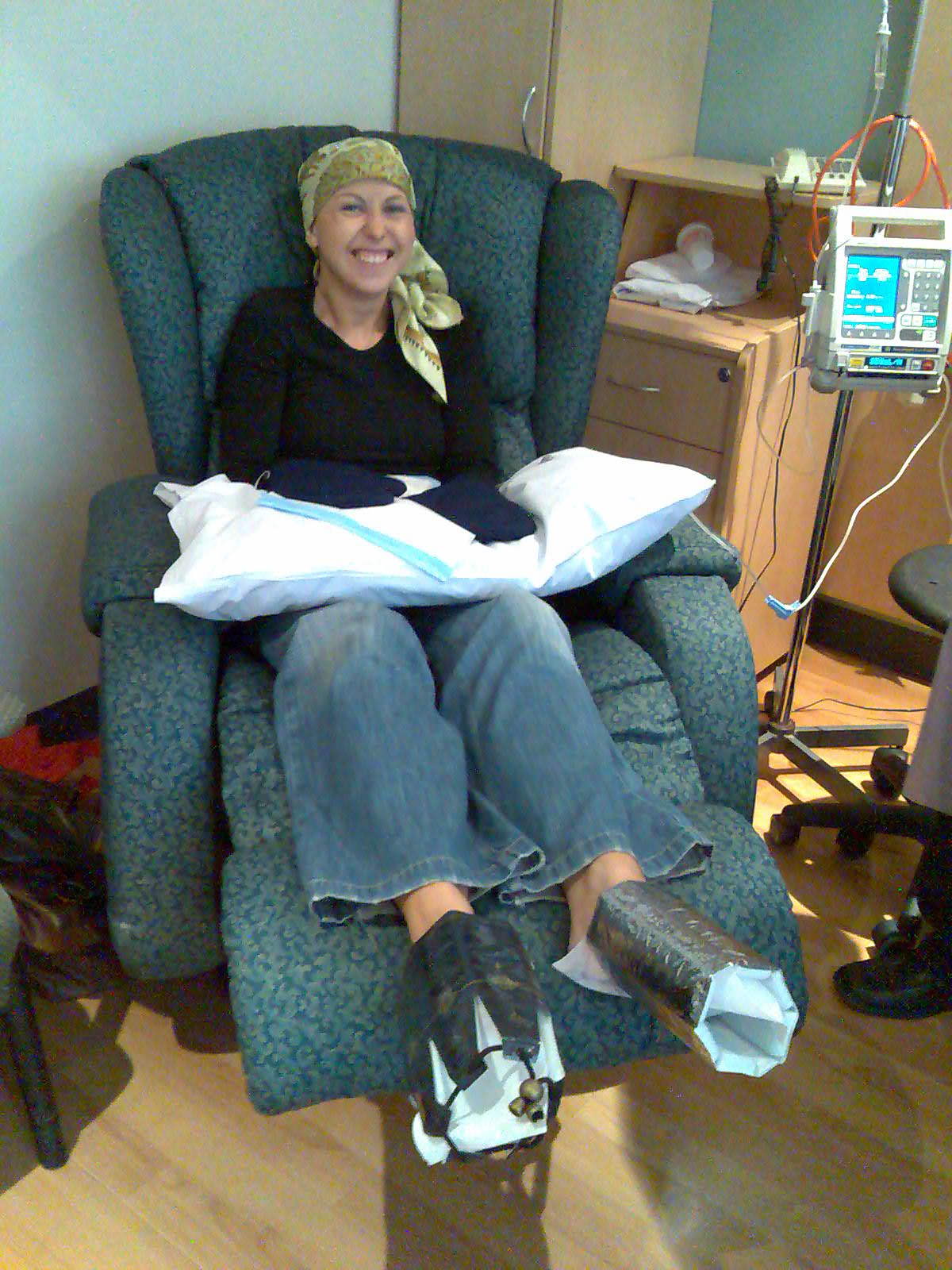
A cancer patient in a head scarf after losing her hair due to chemotherapy

== See also ==
- Kerchief
- Christian headcovering
- Head tie
- Headscarf controversy in Turkey
- Islamic dress in Europe
- Mathabana
- Shalwar Kameez
- Tichel
- Turban
- Veil
