= Women in Amish society =

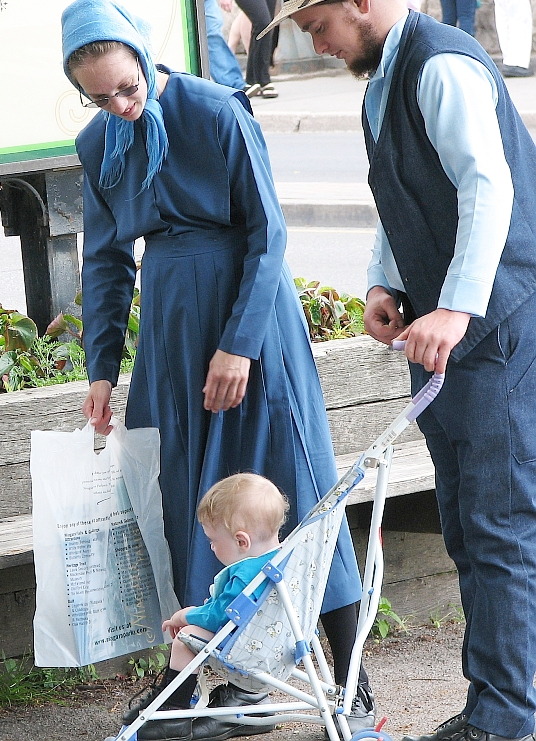
An Amish Woman with her Family

The Amish faith is a highly traditional Christian tradition in the Anabaptist branch of the Reformation. It is practiced almost exclusively in the United States and Canada with large settlements in Pennsylvania, Ohio, and Indiana. Because the traditional beliefs of this religion can conflict with the ideals of mainstream culture, the role of Women in Amish society is visibly different from that of women in the surrounding communities.

== Education and women's work ==
While it is true that Amish women are still expected to do the traditional maternal duties, like child-rearing, it is not unheard of for the modern Amish women to work independently in some way as well. It is not uncommon for Amish women to run their own businesses or go further in their education as girls than their male peers might.

== Clothing ==
Amish women are expected to wear long cape dresses made out of plain fabric; it is not uncommon for a group of Amish women to buy large bulk of a certain color of fabric and make themselves identical dresses to wear. Typically the fabric is not patterned, and cooler colors like lavender and blue are preferred. Women are also expected to wear headcoverings (which are in the form of a kapp) that are meant to express the woman's submission to God in obedience to the biblical ordinance delineated in 1 Corinthians 11:4–10; while adult women in traditional Amish society are expected to wear kapps that cover their head fully with the strings of the kapps neatly tied, it is not necessarily expected for young teenage girls whose headcoverings may more closely resemble the coverings that Mennonite women use rather than a traditional Amish woman's.

== Romance and marriage ==
All romantic relationships are expected to have marriage as the result. When it comes to the selection of a marital partner, there are no arranged marriages by the parents or other mediators. Young people who choose to be baptized into a certain Amish affiliation (typically the one they grew up in) are expected to marry inside this group. When talking about other aspects of romance, like romantic novels, the Amish typically are not actively involved in them. While there is a subgenre of romance novels featuring Amish women, colloquially known as "bonnet rippers", is based around Amish culture, it is typically written by and for the consumption of those who are not in the Amish faith.

== See also ==
- Amish life in the modern world
- Amish way of life
