= Mathabana =

Headdress of Parsi culture

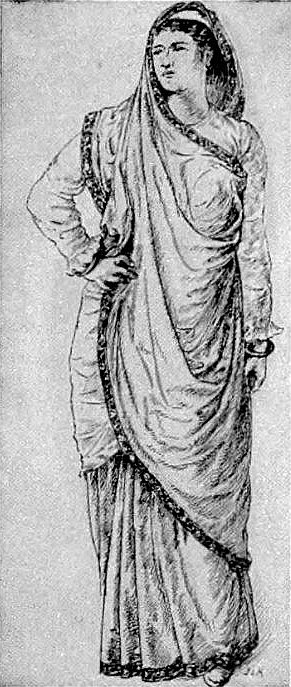
Parsi woman wearing Parsi sari and mathabana or white hair cover.

Mathabana was an essential part of ladies' costumes in Parsi culture in Zoroastrianism. Mathabana is a loose garment similar to the veil, particularly for preventing the display of hair. It was a piece of thin white linen to tie around the head. Parsi women were supposed to cover their hair to appear simple and limit their feminine beauty out of modesty and respect for their culture. The idea has initially been brought from Persia and continued until 50 years back. Males wore skull caps, and females were supposed to wear Mathabana; an uncovered head was considered sinful and against the religion.

== Purpose ==
The purpose of wearing Mathabana is religious beliefs in which the followers cover their heads Hindus Sikhism and Muslims.

== See also ==
- Parsis
- Zoroastrianism
- Headgear
- Headscarf
- Veil
