= Kapp (headcovering) =

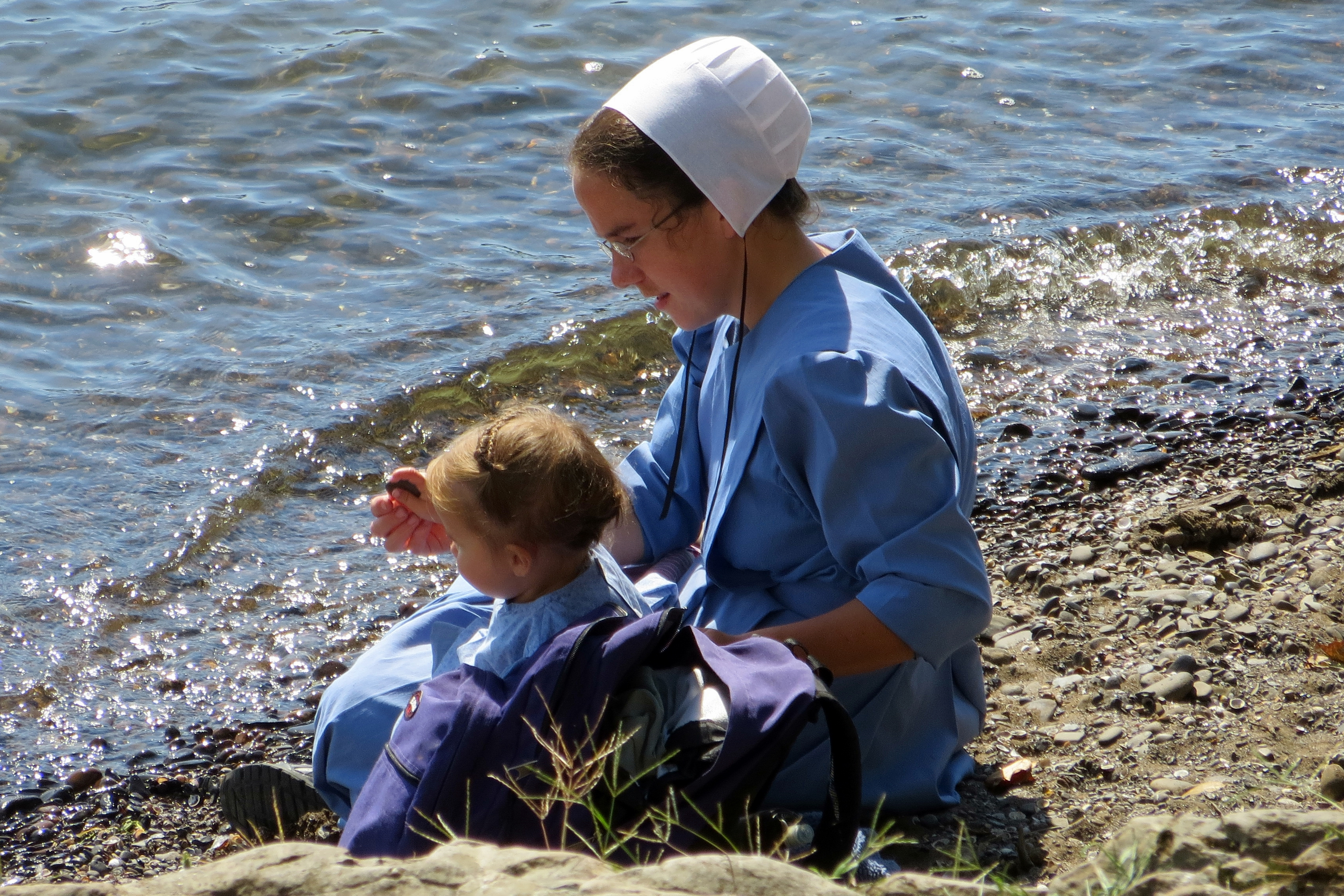
A mother wearing a kapp

A kapp (/kɒp/, Pennsylvania German from German Kappe meaning cap, cover, hood) is a Christian headcovering worn by many women of certain Anabaptist Christian denominations (especially among Amish, Mennonites, Schwarzenau Brethren and River Brethren of the Old Order Anabaptist and Conservative Anabaptist traditions), as well as certain Conservative Friends and Plain Catholics, in obedience to Paul the Apostle's command in 1 Corinthians 11:2–10.

Primitive forms of the kapp are seen in the depictions of early Christian women as portrayed in the "etchings in the Catacomb of Domitila in Rome—dating as far back as A.D. 95". The 12th century Waldensians wore the kapp in France and Italy, as did the early Anabaptists of the 16th century—a practice continued down to the present-day by Old Order Anabaptists and Conservative Anabaptists.

Manuals of early Christianity, including the Didascalia Apostolorum and Pædagogus instructed that a headcovering must be worn by Christian women both during prayer and worship, as well as in public. Reflecting the practice of the primitive Church, the kapp is worn by certain Anabaptist Christian (especially among Mennonites, Amish, Schwarzenau Brethren and River Brethren) and Conservative Quaker women throughout the day based on Saint Paul's dictum that Christians are to "pray without ceasing", Saint Paul's teaching that women being unveiled is dishonourable, and as a reflection of the created order.

Kapps are designed "to be of ample size to cover most of the hair." Women from certain Anabaptist communities, such as the Beachy Amish Mennonites, may wear for their headcovering either a kapp or an opaque hanging veil. The front part of the kapp is known as the fedderdale, while the back part is known as the hinnerdale. The kapp is worn pinned to a woman's hair. During the wintertime, a bonnet is worn over the kapp to keep one warm, with certain Anabaptist Christian communities requiring the bonnet to be worn over the kapp when women leave the home.

== Gallery ==
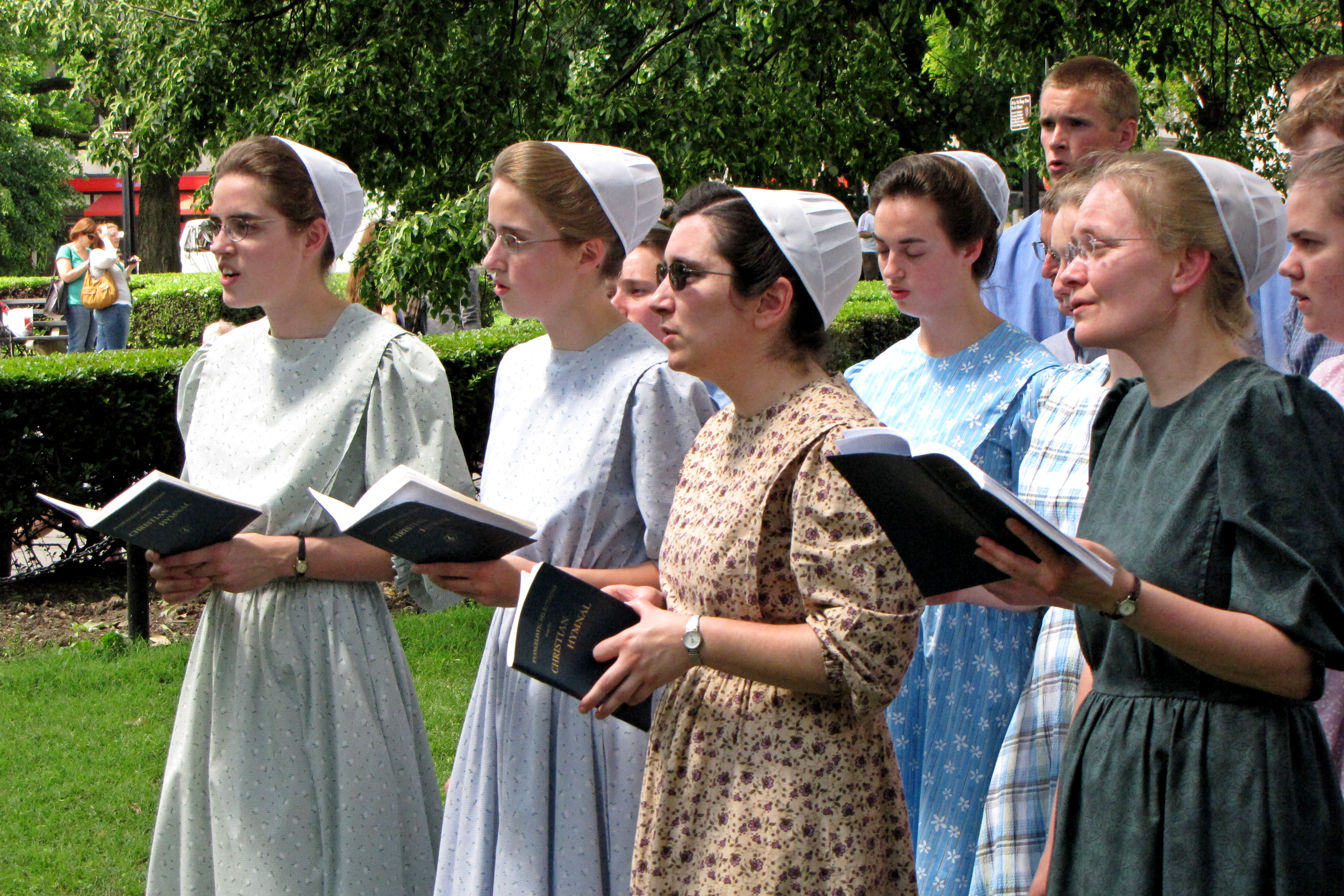
A Conservative Mennonite choir, with women choristers wearing kapps

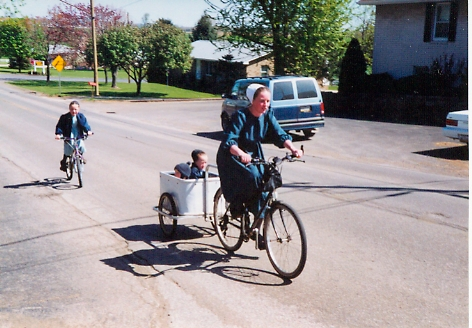
A New Order Amish mother wearing a kapp, going on a shopping trip

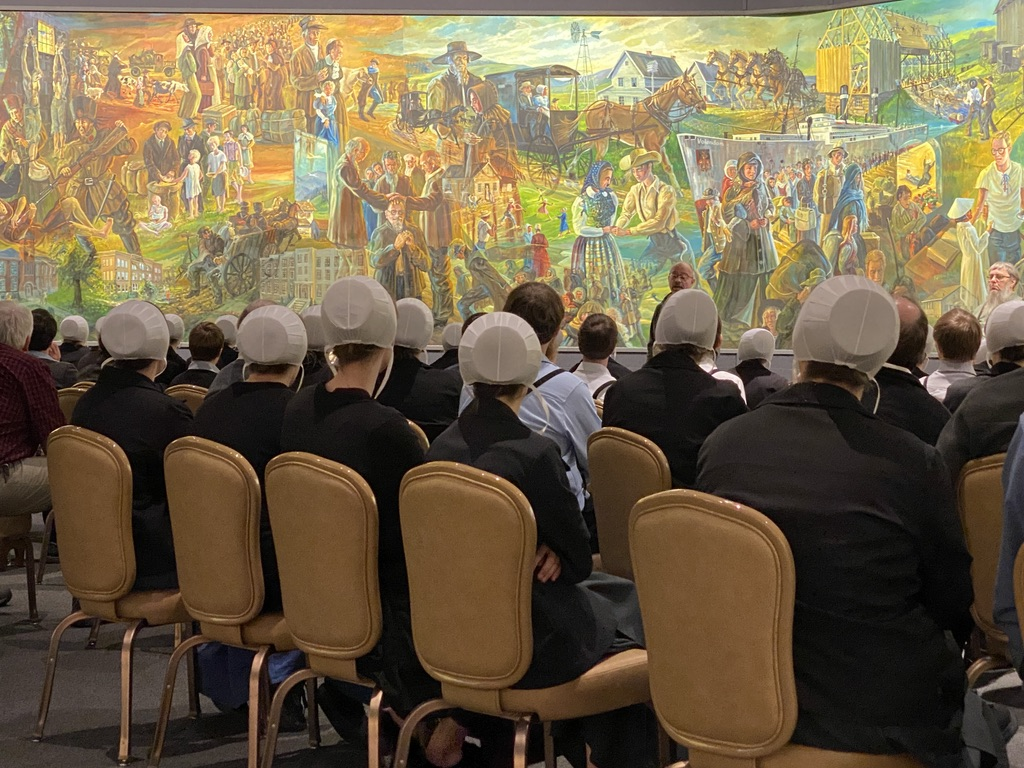
Old Order Amish women at the Behalt painting

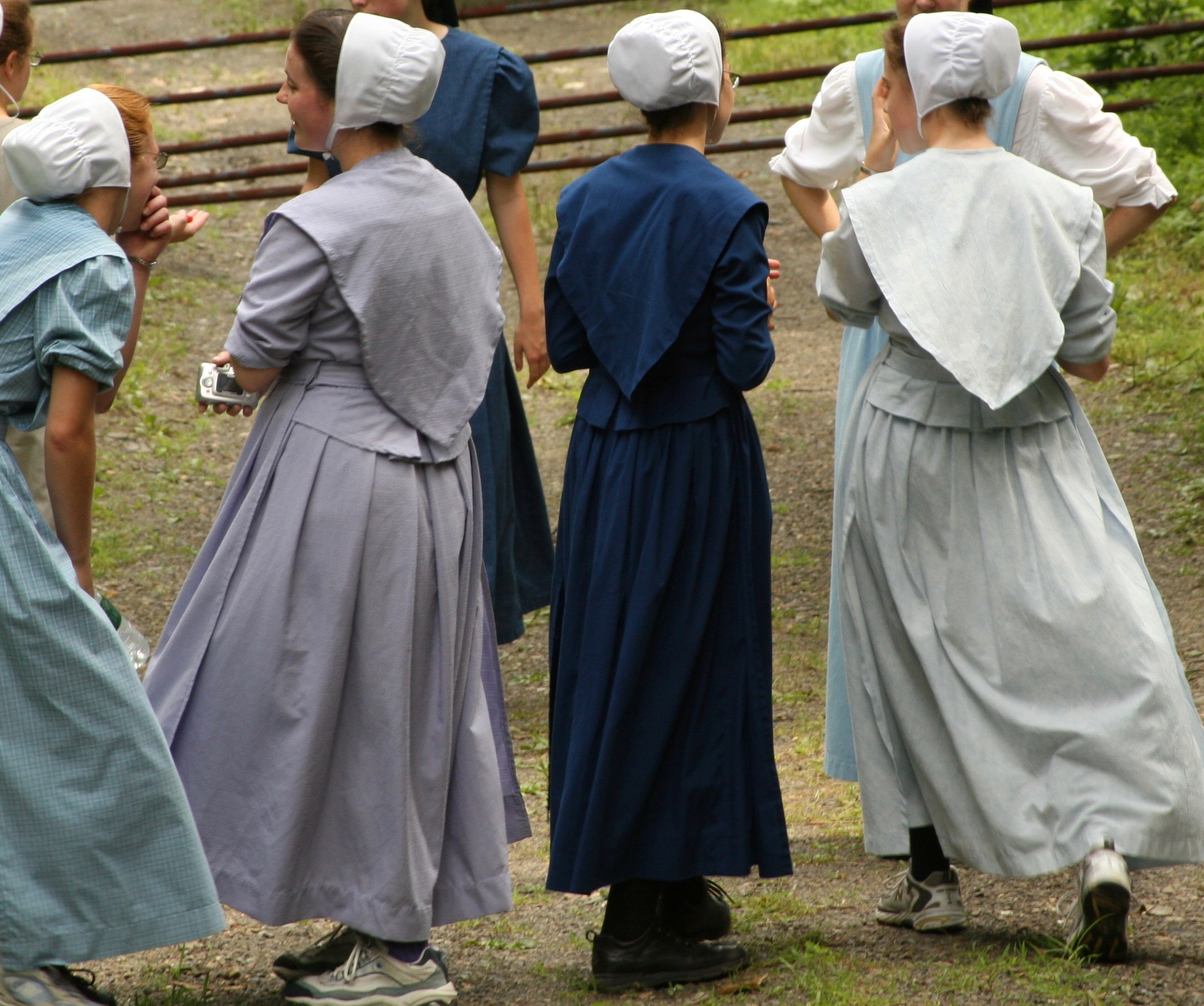
Old Order River Brethren women wearing kapps

== See also ==
- Cape dress
