= Conservative Anabaptism =

Branch of Anabaptist Christianity

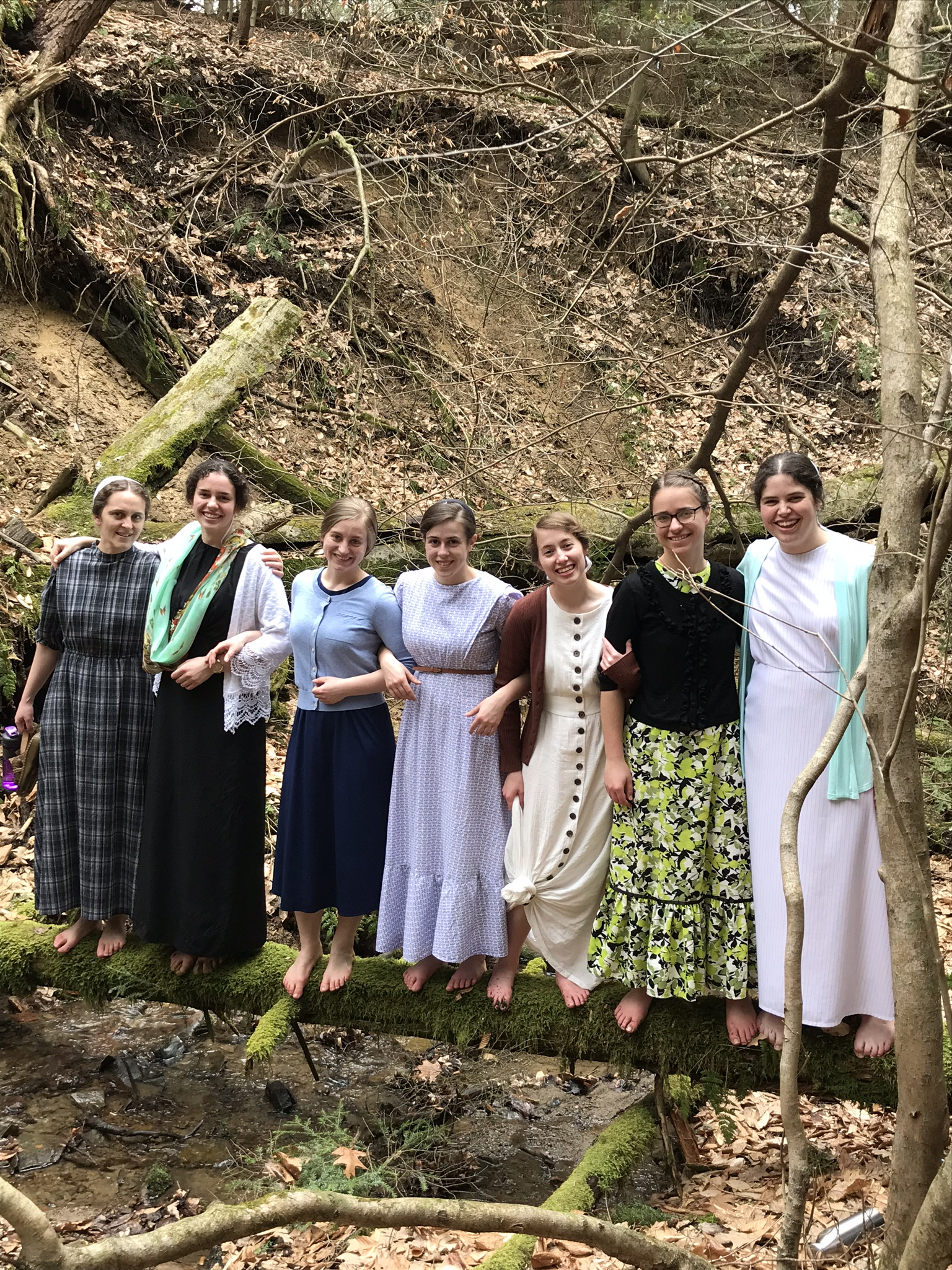
A group of Conservative Anabaptist ladies from various fellowships

Conservative Anabaptism includes theologically conservative Anabaptist denominations, both in doctrine and practice. Conservative Anabaptists, along with Old Order Anabaptists and assimilated mainline Anabaptists, are a subset of the Anabaptist branch of Christianity.

Conservative Anabaptists adhere to Anabaptist doctrine, such as the belief in nonresistance and the observance of plain dress (including the headcovering), while making judicious use of modern technology. Ordinances commonly observed in many Conservative Anabaptist churches include "baptism, communion, footwashing, marriage, anointing with oil, the holy kiss, and the prayer covering." Unlike a number of Old Order Anabaptist groups, Conservative Anabaptists teach the necessity of a born again experience for salvation.

Conservative Anabaptists may have Sunday school, hold revival meetings, or operate their own Christian schools (parochial schools). Additionally, Conservative Anabaptist fellowships are often engaged in evangelism and missionary work; a 1993 report showed that Conservative Anabaptist denominations in general grew by fifty percent overall within the previous fifteen years.

Among Conservative Anabaptists are the Dunkard Brethren Church, Conservative Mennonites, and Beachy Amish, as well as the Bruderhof Communities, Apostolic Christian Church and the Charity Christian Fellowship. Conservative Anabaptists form 15% of Anabaptist Christianity as a whole.

In response to a perceived laxity in adherence to Anabaptist doctrine and practice, certain Conservative Anabaptist denominations, such as the Biblical Mennonite Alliance and the Dunkard Brethren Church, were formed after adherents separated from their parent (usually mainline Anabaptist) bodies; on the other hand, the Beachy Mennonites are composed of individuals who left Old Order Anabaptist groups and "were deeply committed to evangelism and mission work." Other Conservative Anabaptist denominations, such as Charity Christian Fellowship, have been organized by people from diverse backgrounds.

Various congregations lend support to Christian Aid Ministries, a Conservative Anabaptist missionary and relief organization known for posting billboard messages throughout the United States and Canada. Beside The Still Waters is a daily devotional widely used by Conservative Anabaptists. Congregations of Conservative Anabaptist denominations have experienced continued growth, with Conservative Anabaptists having "large families and high retention rates".
