= Charity Ministries =

Charity Ministries, also called Charity Christian Fellowship, is a Conservative Anabaptist network of churches that was formed in 1982 in Lancaster County, Pennsylvania.

As with other conservative Anabaptist Christian churches, the Charity Christian Fellowship seeks to emulate early Christianity and practices plain dress, believer's baptism, "feet washing, the devotional head covering, the holy kiss, non-swearing of oaths and practicing Biblical Nonresistance (As described in Matthew 5:45)."

Many members of the Charity Christian Fellowship have roots in other Anabaptist denominations that practice plain dress, though their emphasis on evangelism has led to individuals from non-Anabaptist Christian backgrounds becoming a part of the Charity Christian Fellowship as well.

== History ==
In 1982, individuals with roots in different Plain Anabaptist groups met in New Holland in order to form a church that would recapture the zeal of early Christianity and the tenets of the Anabaptist movement of the 16th century. Mose Stoltzfus, an ex-Amish (1946–2020), and Denny Kenaston, an ex-Baptist (1949–2012), were the main leaders of the new church.

In the early years it was more of a spiritual movement than a church.

In the late 1980s, a tape ministry was started as well as an organization for foreign missions. A publication called The Heartbeat of the Remnant, short The Remnant, was started in 1994. In 2011 its publication was transferred to its affiliated Ephrata Ministries and in summer 2013 its publication was stopped. In 2016 The Berean Voice, a ministry of Faith Christian Fellowship, resumed the publication.

Beginning around 2010, a number of conservative Charity congregations regrouped together as the Agape Christian Fellowship.

== Belief and practice ==
The Charity churches profess to be Conservative Anabaptist in doctrine. The churches of the network resemble Conservative Mennonites in many ways. Members wear plain dress, with some of the women observing plain dress through the wearing of the cape dress with a head covering in the form of a hanging veil. Believer's baptism by immersion, Foot washing and the Holy Kiss are practiced. Non-swearing of oaths and opposition to military service are also mandatory. They also place a strong emphasis on evangelism towards other Anabaptist and non-Anabaptist groups.

== Members and congregations ==
Year	Membership
1993	~500
2000	1,467
2012	2,232

In 1993 there were nine churches in eight states of the US and around 500 baptized members. Around the year 2000 there were 24 congregations in the network in fifteen states of the US, mainly in Pennsylvania and Ohio. There were 1,467 members and an estimated total population including children and young adults not yet baptized of 2,787 people. In 2012 there were 41 congregations with 2,232 members associated with Charity Ministries.
