= Hanging veil =

Type of Christian headcovering

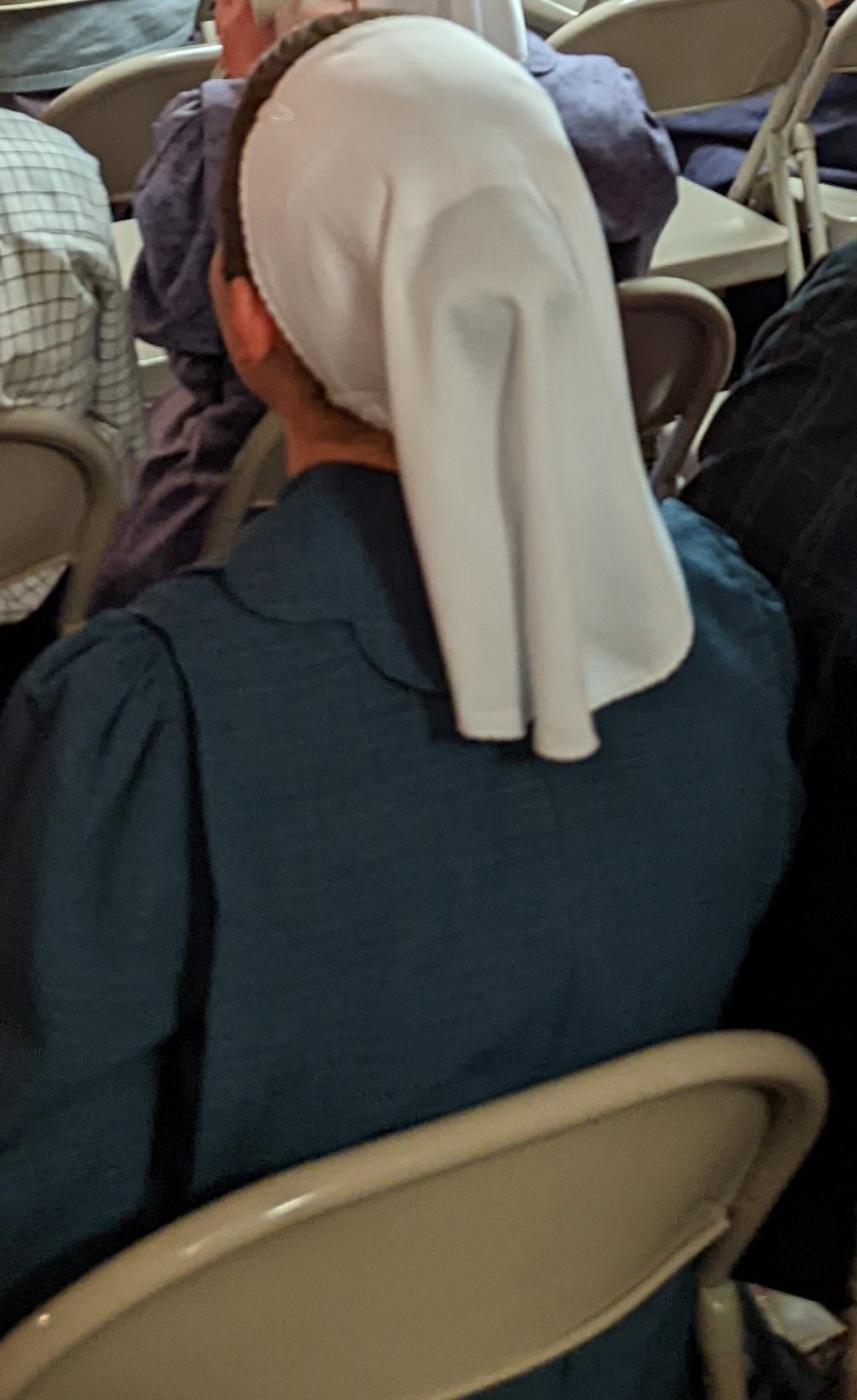
A hanging veil worn by an Anabaptist Christian woman belonging to the Charity Christian Fellowship

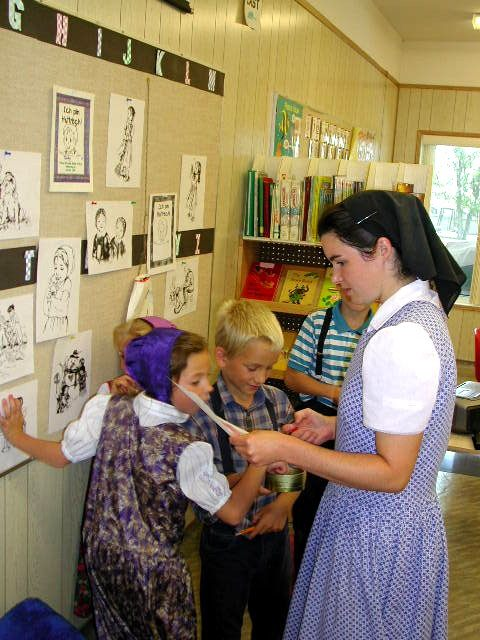
A Hutterite teacher wearing a kerchief-style veil

A hanging veil, also known as a flowing veil or charity veil, is a type of Christian headcovering which is worn by some Christian women continually, in obedience to Paul the Apostle's command in 1 Corinthians 11:2–10. They are designed to drape over the natural curves of a woman's head and hang down a woman's neck. Opaque hanging veils are usually white or black in colour for modesty.

Hanging veils enjoy popularity in a diverse array of Christian denominations, especially those of the Anabaptist Christian tradition (such as Mennonites and Hutterites). In certain Conservative Mennonite Anabaptist congregationations of the Beachy Amish Mennonite tradition, an opaque hanging veil is permitted as an alternative to the kapp if it covers as much or more hair as the kapp, which traditionally is "of ample size to cover most of the hair". Certain denominations of Christianity provide guidelines regarding the headcovering; the Ministry Training Center of the Biblical Mennonite Alliance, for example, teaches:

A veiling shall be worn by the sisters. We believe the best application of the headship principle as taught in I Corinthians 11 is for the veiling to be worn as a part of their regular attire to cover hair that is allowed to grow to its natural length. Ladies shall wear all their hair neatly up, avoiding fashion extremes, covered with a hanging veil, scarf, or traditional Mennonite covering of sufficient size to substantially cover the hair. Hanging veils and scarves must cover at least from the crown of the head to the bottom of the hair bun.

Women who headcover with the hanging veil wear it throughout the day, with the exception of sleeping, based on Saint Paul's dictum that Christians are to "pray without ceasing", Saint Paul's teaching that women being unveiled is dishonourable, and as a reflection of the created order. Manuals of early Christianity, including the Didascalia Apostolorum and Pædagogus likewise instruct that a headcovering must be worn by a Christian woman both during prayer and worship, as well as in public.

== See also ==
- Cape dress
