= Cape dress =

Dress for women with a cape-like garment

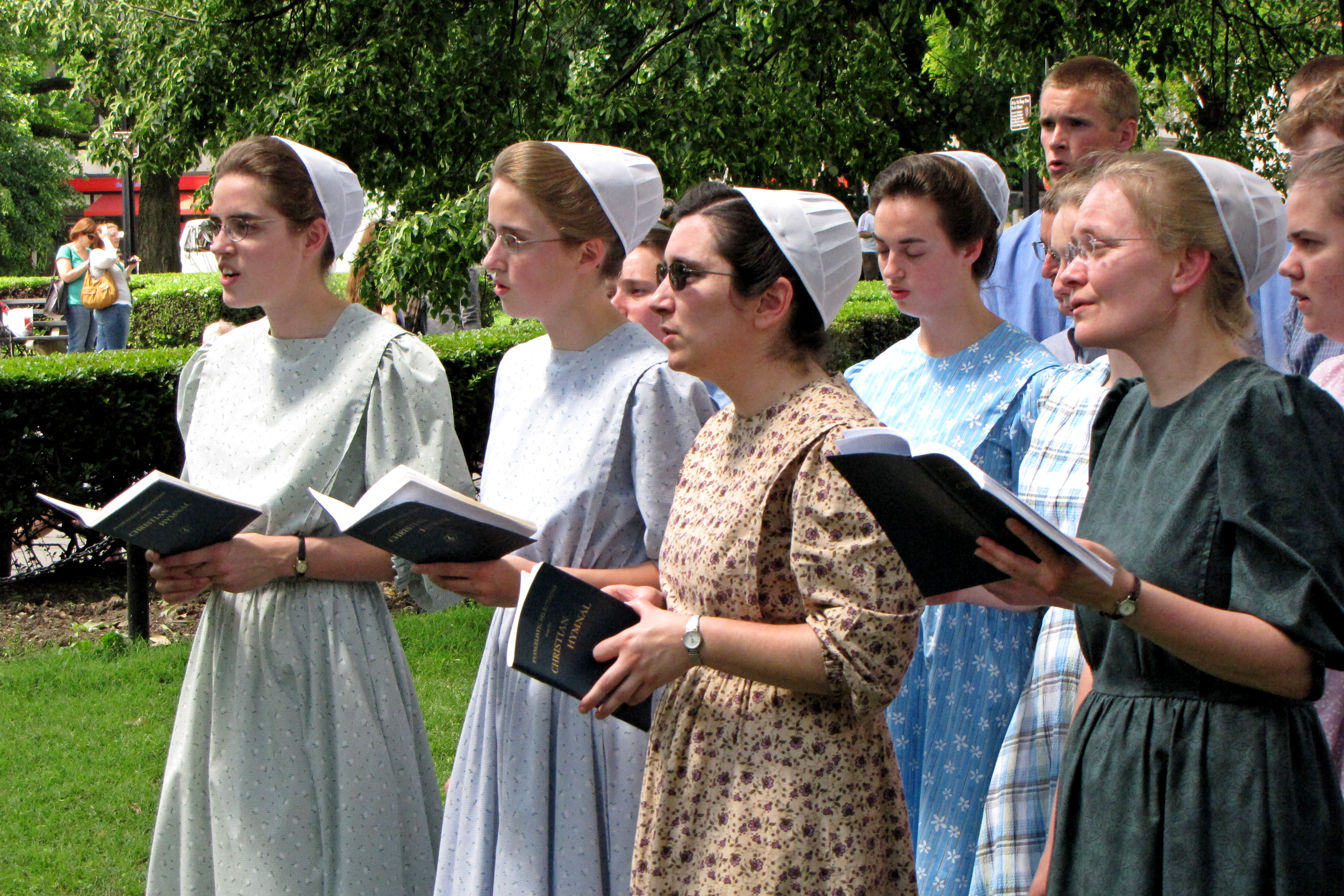
Anabaptist women wearing cape dresses and headcoverings

A cape dress describes a woman's dress that combines features of the cape and the dress. Either a cape-like garment is attached to the dress, pinned or sewn on, and integrated into its construction, or the dress and cape are made to coordinate in fabric and/or color.

Cape dresses provide a modest double layer in the bodice area. They also provide a long, full, skirt that conceals the form and falls at least below the knee and sometimes down to the ankle, depending upon the Christian denomination. Cape dresses are traditionally worn by female Anabaptist Christian church members, such as Mennonite, Brethren, Amish and Charity women. Along with the adjective kosmios (κόσμιος) meaning "modest", 1 Timothy 2:9–10 uses the Greek word catastola katastolé (καταστολῇ) for the apparel suitable for Christian females, and for this reason, women belonging to traditional Anabaptist denominations often wear a cape dress; for example, members of the Charity Christian Fellowship (an Anabaptist denomination) wear the cape dress as the denomination teaches that "the sisters are to wear a double layered garment as the Greek word 'catastola' describes." Cape dresses have additionally been worn by traditional Christians of the Quaker and Shaker denominations, among others.

Each local church group has its own regulations and basic pattern, so that when meeting each other, members of plain churches can generally recognize each other's specific congregations. Many churches have a dress pattern where the cape is attached at the waist. Others, especially among the Brethren churches, have maintained a dress pattern where the cape is loose at the bottom edge. Additionally the cape dress, in extreme forms, has become a part of fashion vocabulary.

The cape dress is worn with a headcovering, often in the form of a kapp or an opaque hanging veil.

== In Mennonite culture ==
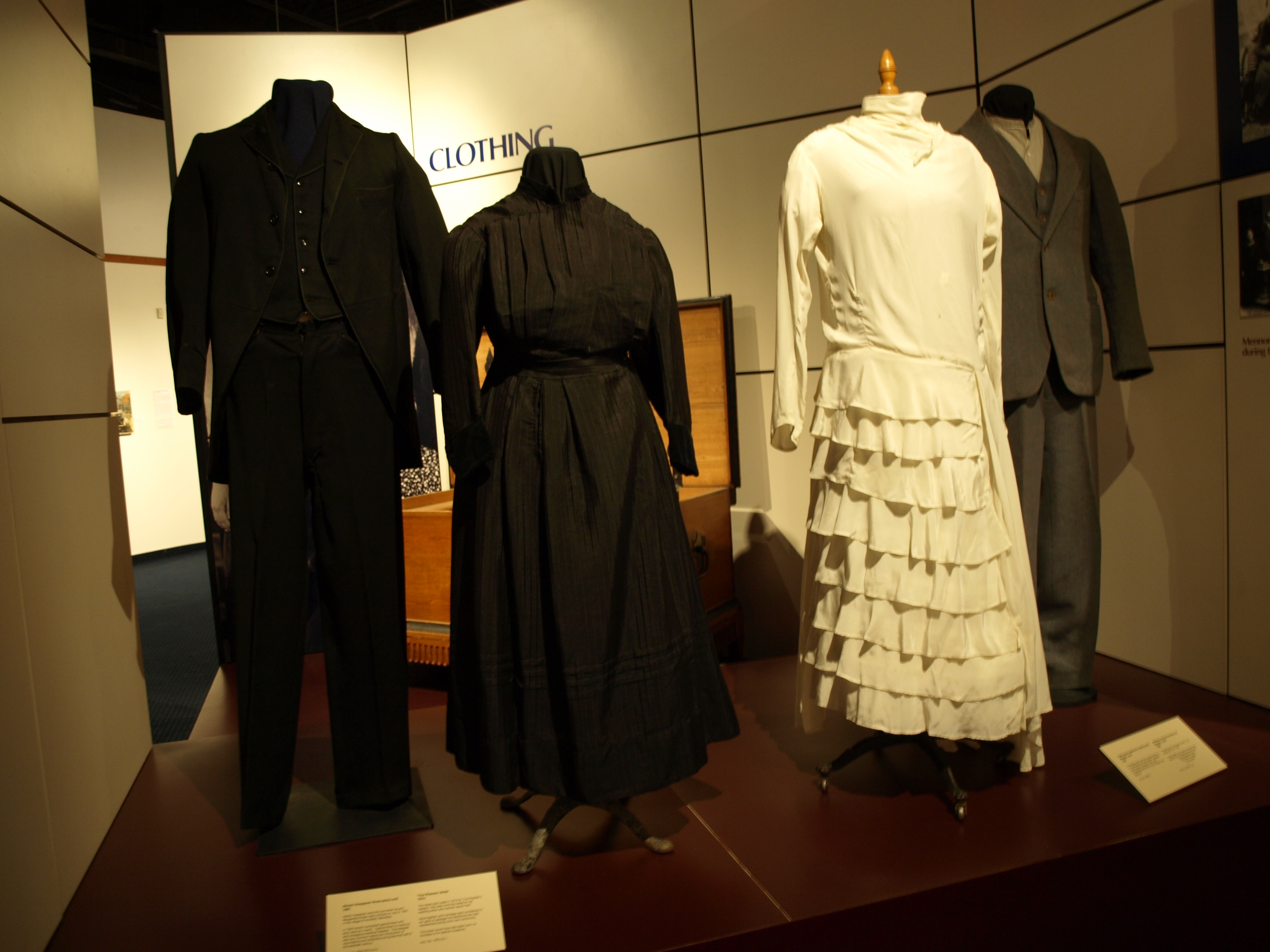
A clothing exhibit at the Mennonite Heritage Village museum showing apparel worn by Mennonite men and women.

In the 19th and 20th century popular female fashion changed radically to be more form-fitting and revealing. At the same time, the cape dress continued to be worn by women who were members of conservative, traditional Mennonite and other Anabaptist communities.

The cape dress has a plain style and a double layer of fabric covers the bodice. This piece of fabric has a square or V-shape form and cloaks, or de-emphasizes the female form.

The women of the Holdeman Mennonite community in California wear a cape-dress that has a high neckline, loose bodice and fitted waist. The cape of the dress covers the shoulders and bust. Because of religious reasons, no (or only minor) adornment of the dress is allowed. The plainer the dress, the higher it is valued by some churches. For the Plain Christian community, women's clothing symbolizes her embrace of Biblical and traditional gender roles.

According to men, the cape dress signifies a woman’s submission to God, her desire to be modest and not serve as a temptation or snare to men, her glad embrace of her place in the order of creation, as well as identification with the other members of her church. Besides that it continues to be a statement of nonconformity to the world, especially against rapid and dramatically changing, body revealing fashions from the end of the 19th century onwards.

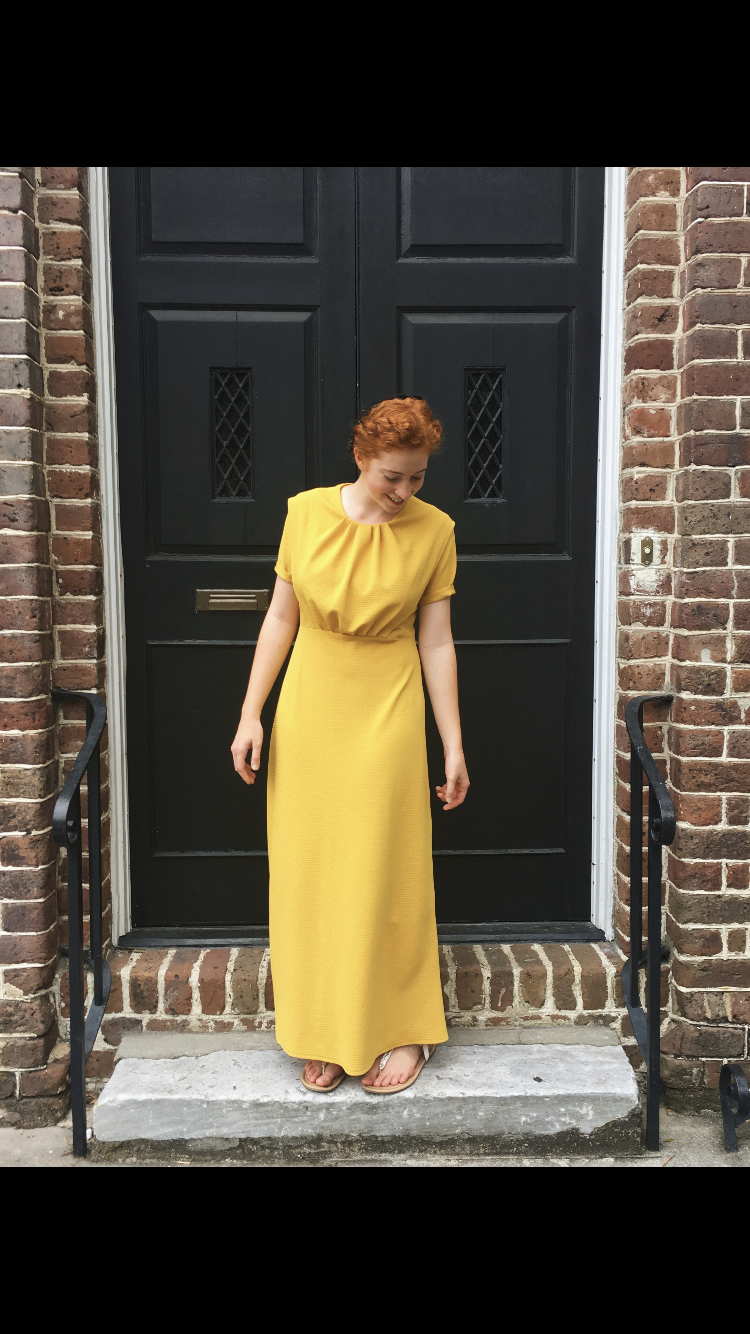
A Conservative Mennonite lady in a cape dress

== In fashion ==
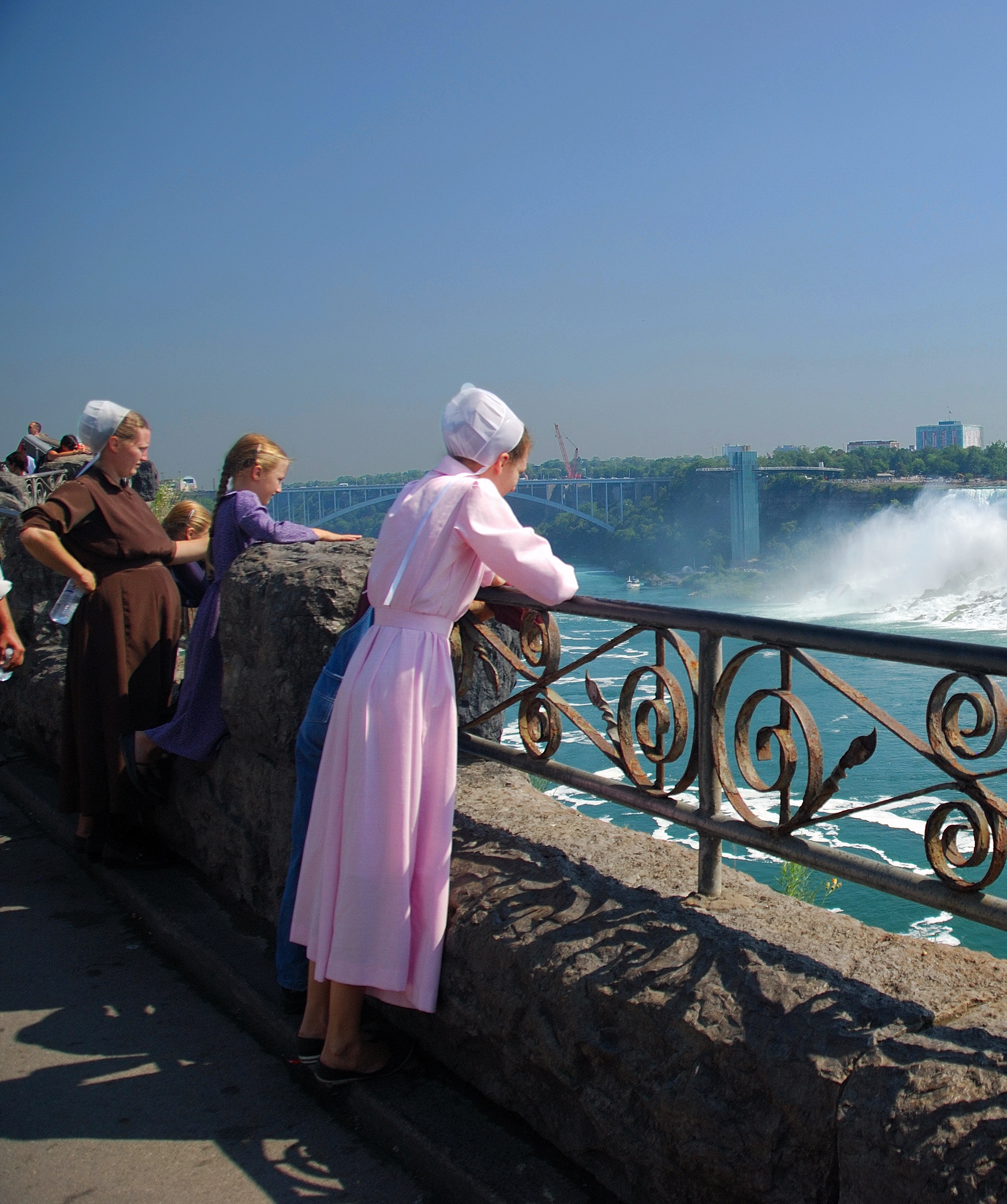
A pink coloured cape dress

The cape dress has occurred in different variations in fashion and film. Greta Garbo wore an Art Deco inspired cape dress in the film The Torrent (1926). The dress has a geometrical black-and-white pattern and a stiff round ruff. The cape dress was also popular in the 1950s. Two types were prominent at the time: a full-skirted, sleeveless dress with a matching, elbow-length cape or a beltless, sheath dress with matching cape.

In the collection of the Victoria and Albert Museum various cape dresses can be found. In 1933 Madeleine Vionnet created a woollen jersey dress and matching cape. Coco Chanel designed a dress with matching cape in 1937–38. The dress consisted of silk and net covered with black sequins. It was lined with satin. In 1967 Cristóbal Balenciaga created an evening ensemble consisting of a matching cape and sleeveless dress out of black gazar silk. Philippe Venet created a black-and-white dress with a cape-like collar in 1989.

In the 2010s, multiple fashion designers featured the cape dress in their collections:

- Stéphane Rolland created various cape dresses in black, blue and white as part of his Fall 2010 collection.
- Gwyneth Paltrow wore a white cape and dress by Tom Ford to the Oscars in 2012.
- Queen Máxima wore a dress and matching cape by Jan Taminiau during the inauguration of King Willem-Alexander on 30 April 2013 (Netherlands).
- Lupita Nyong'o wore a red cape dress by Ralph Lauren to the Golden Globe Awards in January 2014.

== See also ==
- Plain people
- Christian headcovering
- Prairie dress
- Outward holiness
