= JJ Hat Center =

NYC's oldest hat shop

JJ Hat Center is a hat retailer founded in New York City in 1911. It is located at 310 Fifth Avenue in Manhattan, New York, and at 153 Boulevard Saint-Germain in Paris.

JJ Hat Center is primarily known for selling hats and headwear, as well as for its long history as a specialist retailer in New York City. The shop is also listed by NYC Tourism + Conventions among shopping destinations in New York City. The company is directed by French entrepreneur Jérôme Louis.

== History ==
JJ Hat Center opened in New York City in 1911. In 2000, The New Yorker described the shop, located at 310 Fifth Avenue, as New York City's oldest continuously operating hat shop.

In 2008, The New York Times included JJ Hat Center in an article about traditional hatters still operating in New York. In 2011, The Wall Street Journal published a profile of the shop in an article by Ralph Gardner Jr.

The shop has subsequently been mentioned in several media reports about traditional hat retailing in New York. In 2015, CBS News filmed a segment at JJ Hat Center about choosing a Stetson hat. In 2018, The New York Times included the shop in an article about notable places to buy hats in New York. In 2021, sisterMAG published a feature on the shop and traditional hatmaking in New York.

In October 2025, JJ Hat Center opened a shop in Paris, France, at 153 Boulevard Saint-Germain. It was the company's first retail location in Europe.

== Locations ==
JJ Hat Center operates its New York shop at 310 Fifth Avenue in Manhattan. The company also states that it has a Paris shop located at 153 Boulevard Saint-Germain in the 6th arrondissement of Paris.

== Cultural references ==
JJ Hat Center is mentioned in Patti Smith's memoir Just Kids. Smith writes that she bought Robert Mapplethorpe a Borsalino hat at JJ Hat Center on Fifth Avenue.
