= Church crown =

American hat worn by women during Christian services

A church crown, also known as a church hat, is a decorative hat worn by women in the Southern United States as a headcovering during Christian church services in accordance with 1 Corinthians 11:2–13. Though church crowns were common among all American women until the mid-20th century, they continue to be worn in certain denominations that teach the historic practice of Christian headcovering, such as the Free Presbyterian Church and Plymouth Brethren, as well as in the black church. The practice of women wearing a headcovering, found in the Bible, "has been adapted and expanded to become a stylish part of Southern women’s churchgoing attire."

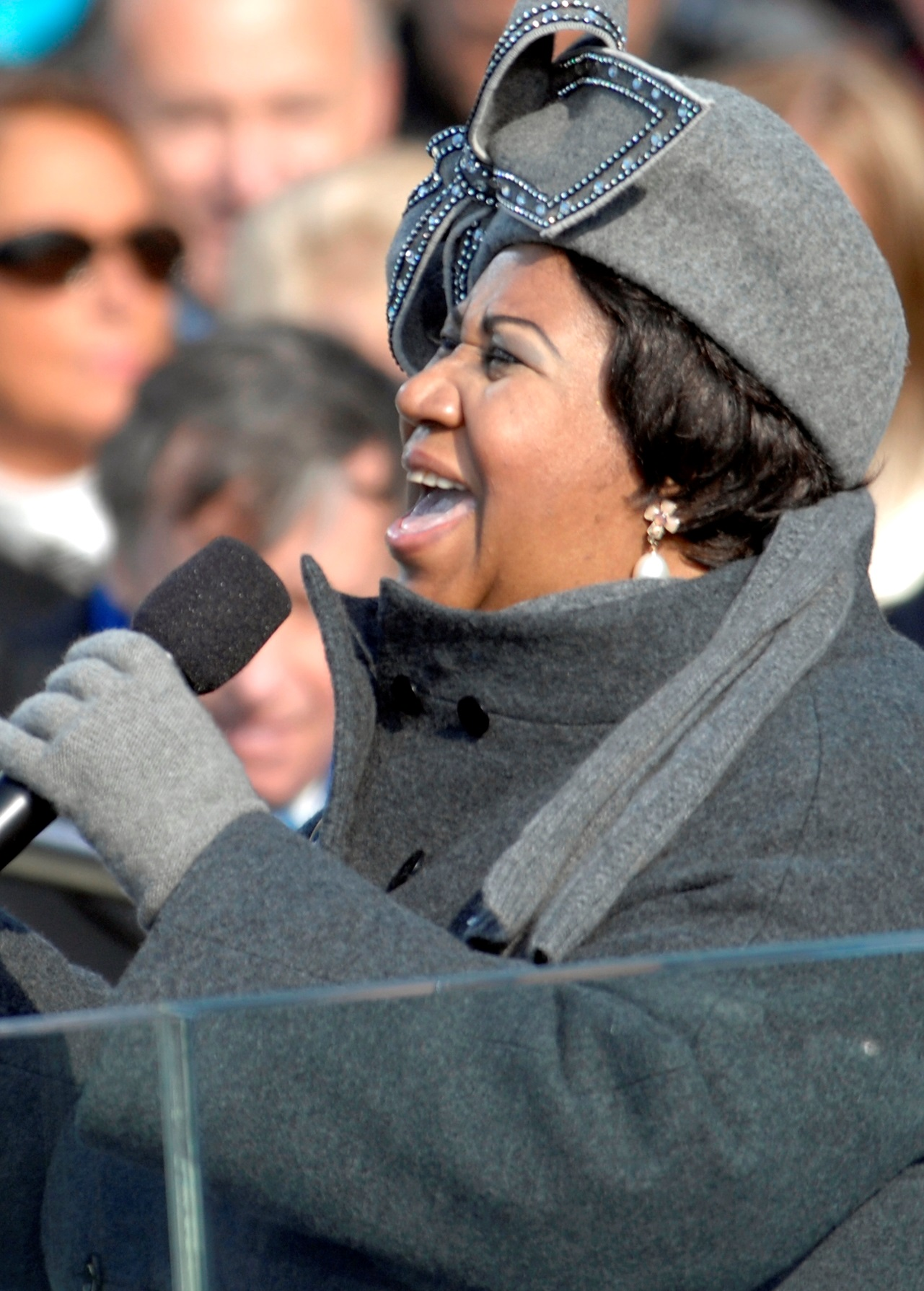
Aretha Franklin at the 2009 Inauguration of Barack Obama in a hat similar to those worn by Black churchgoers.

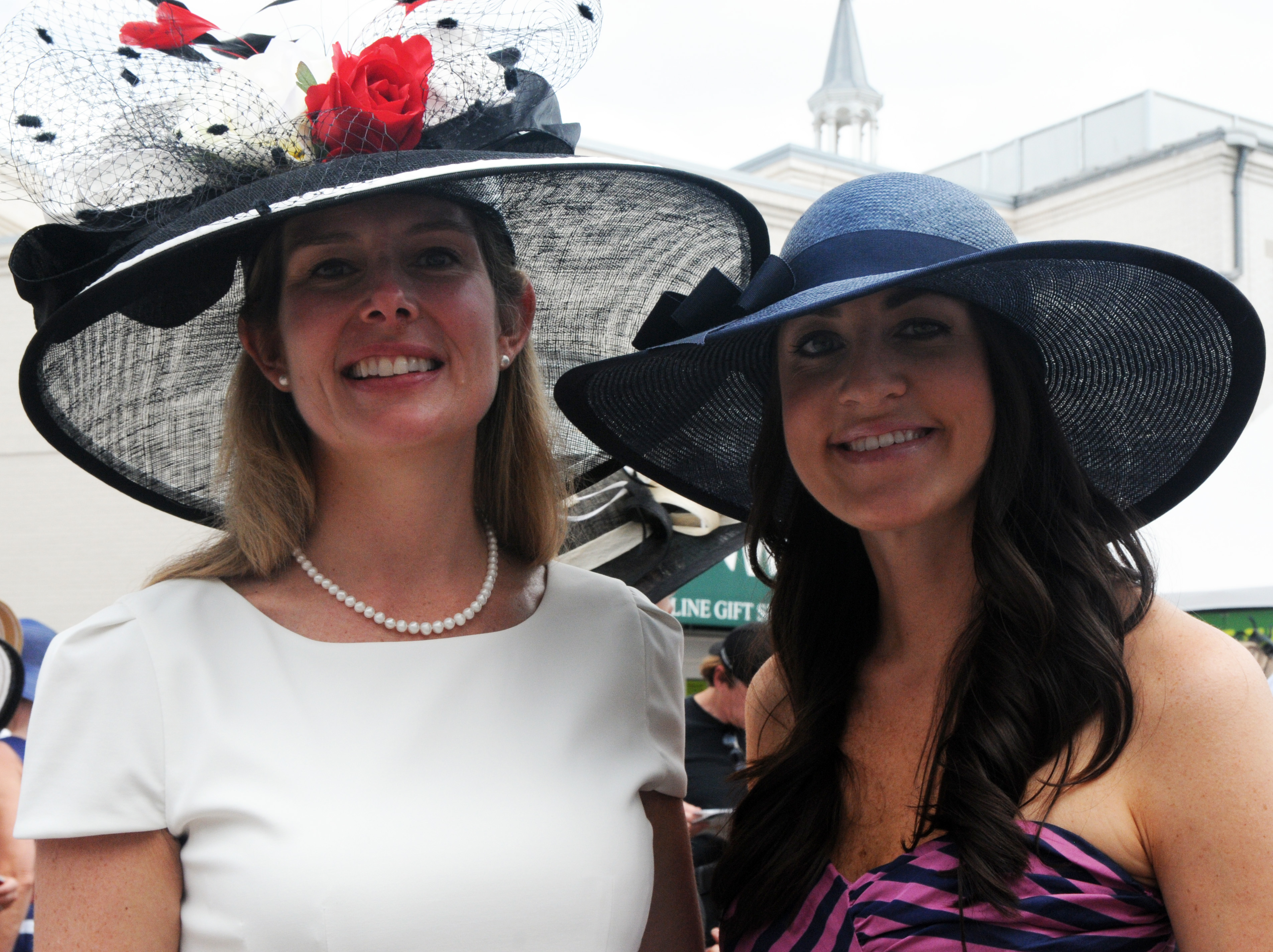
Such designs of church crowns are typical of those worn to Christian services of worship in the Southern United States, though they may be worn to other important cultural events, such as the Kentucky Derby.

Church crowns are typically a straw hat or fascinator covered with adornments that may include sequins, feathers, lace, tulle, or ribbons. The hats may vary widely in their structure, color, and complexity.

== Culture ==
An American adaption of the Christian headcovering required for women in 1 Corinthians 11, church crowns are worn at Christian religious services, being especially common at holidays such as Palm Sunday, Easter and Mother's Day. Crowns are worn more often by older women within the congregation. It is common for women who do wear crowns to own hats for many occasions; journalist Craig Mayberry noted that the fifty crown-wearing women he interviewed owned an average of fifty-four hats each.

Church crown culture involves an unspoken code of etiquette. The hat should not be wider than a woman's shoulders or darker than her shoes. Touching or borrowing another woman's hat is frowned upon, but a woman may pass on a hat to her daughter or granddaughter.

== History ==
=== Origins ===
In the United States prior to the 20th century, Christian women of various races and denominations practiced headcovering in accordance with 1 Corinthians 11, in which the Apostle Paul calls for them to do so. In the Southern United States, church hats became the adaptation of the biblical injunction of headcovering for Christian women. African-American women wore eye-catching head coverings during this time as Sundays were a time of rest, worship, and celebration. For enslaved women, this provided a rare opportunity to assert one's individuality.

The design of certain church crowns are believed to have roots in decorative headwear worn by women in West Africa on special occasions.

=== 20th century ===
The tradition of the church crown emerged in the early 20th century. Many African-American women were employed as domestic workers during the week, so Sunday church services provided an outlet for self-expression. The hats were also seen as a way to honor God. As the Black middle class emerged during the first decades of the 20th century, church crowns took on the role of a status symbol.

By the 1960s, younger women began rejecting the church crown tradition as a symbol of the black bourgeoisie—a time when headcoverings in churches, in general, were waning in view of the rising feminist movement, according to David Bercot, a scholar of early Christianity. The hats experienced a revival in the 1990s.

=== 21st century ===
The magazine Southern Living published an article in the 2010s stating that "Church hats remain an essential part of many women’s Sunday best and church outfits across the South". A 2014 piece by Samuel G. Freedman in The New York Times described a "generational divide" regarding church crowns within the contemporary black church. Freedman cited education, economics, and modern hairstyles as factors contributing to decreased interest in crowns among younger churchgoers. Many churches host "Hattitude" events as occasions for women in the congregation to wear and celebrate their hats. As a whole, in the 21st century, the wearing of headcoverings by women has been revived in certain American church congregations among those who have sought to follow the precedent set in scripture and church history—though the practice has been perpetually followed since the Apostolic Age in many parts of the world, as with Russia and the Indian subcontinent, and among certain Christian denominations, such as Conservative Mennonites and Plymouth Brethren.

== In popular culture ==
In 2002, photographer Michael Cunningham and journalist Craig Marberry published a book featuring portraits of women in their church crowns along with the stories of their photographic subjects. The book was adapted into an Off-Broadway play by Regina Taylor that same year.

The third season of television series The Wire features an episode titled "Slapstick" in which Barksdale Organization gang members Gerard and Sapper violate a Sunday morning truce to attack their rival Omar Little and his grandmother. The two attackers shoot off her church crown as they attempt to kill Little.

The National Museum of African American History and Culture collection features several church crowns designed by Philadelphia milliner Mae Reeves.

The late singer Aretha Franklin was known for wearing "church lady hats" that suited her background in gospel music. She most famously wore such a hat, designed by Luke Song, to sing "My Country 'Tis of Thee" at the 2009 inauguration of Barack Obama. The black pillbox hat spawned internet memes and garnered its own Facebook page. Following Franklin's death in 2018, the hat was subject to legal battles concerning the singer's wills. Claimants to the hat included Franklin's four sons and Barack Obama, who had requested the hat for his presidential library.

== See also ==
- Easter bonnet
- Kerchief
