= Stephanie Leigh Batiste =

American scholar

Stephanie Leigh Batiste is an American academic, author, and performance artist. She is currently associate professor in the Departments of English and Black Studies at the University of California, Santa Barbara (UCSB).

== Early life ==
Batiste earned an AB in sociology with minors in African American Studies and Theater from Princeton University in 1994. She was awarded her Masters and PhD in American Studies from George Washington University in 1999 and 2003 respectively. She is also a performance artist, the author and original performer of Stacks of Obits.

== Career ==
From 2002 to 2007, Batiste was an assistant professor at Carnegie Mellon University presenting lectures through Carnegie Mellon's Center for Africanamerican Urban Studies and the Economy. From 2004 to 2005, Batiste was a faculty fellow, Research Institute for the Comparative Study of Race and Ethnicity at Stanford University. In 2007 she left Carnegie Mellon for a position at UCSB, and from 2009 has been associate professor of Black Studies and English. Her scholarly perspective construes "the relationships between representation, performance, identity, race, and power. Her research and teaching focus on the ways in which cultural texts, like literature, theater, performance, film, art, and bodies, act as imaginative systems that create identity, cultural values, human interactions, and possibilities of justice. In 2011-12, Batiste was Acting Chair of the Black Studies Department in the Social Sciences and Humanities at UCSB.

== Selected works ==
In an overview derived from writings by Stephanie Batiste, OCLC/WorldCat encompasses several works and publications, including the following:

- Darkening Mirrors: Discourses of Imperialism in Depression Era African American Performance (book) (2011)
- Stacks of Obits (performance piece) (2003)

Articles

- “Affective Moves: Violence, space, and the body in RIZE’s krump dancing,” in The Oxford Handbook of Dance and the Popular Screen, Melissa Blanco-Borelli, ed., Oxford University Press, forthcoming 2012.
- “Dunham Possessed: Ethnographic Bodies, Movement, and Transnational Constructions of Blackness,” The Journal of Haitian Studies. Vol. 13, No. 2, Fall 2007, 8–22.
- “Hip Hop and This One-Woman Show,” in Homegirls, Make Some Noise!: Hip Hop Feminisms Anthology, Gwendolyn D. Pough, Elaine Richardson, Rachel Raimist, and Aisha Durham, eds., New York, Parker Publishing, March 2007.
- “We Are the Way Things Are!,” in Diversity Revisited/ A Reflection. A Summary of Diversity Revisited/ A Conversation on Diversity in the Arts Convening, The African American Cultural Center of Greater Pittsburgh and the Association of Performing Arts Presenters. August 2005. www.africanaculture.org
- “Stacks of Obits: Affective Responses to Street Murder—Empathy and Violence” (Culture in [Cities) in Culture], Ege University, Izmir, Turkey, May 2004
- “Epaulettes and Leaf Skirts, Warriors and Subversives: Black National Subjectivity in Macbeth and Haiti,” Text and Performance Quarterly, Volume 23, Number 2, April 2003, 154–185.
- "Forging Partnerships, Creating Contexts: African American History at the U.S. National Park Service," with Michele Gates Moresi and Marguerite Carnell Rodney. Cultural Resource Management. Vol. 20, No. 2, 1997, 44–45.
