= Michèle Gates Moresi =

American museum curator

Michèle Gates Moresi is an American museum curator. Moresi has been a curator at the National Museum of African American History and Culture in Washington, DC since 2006.

== Career ==
Gates Moresi studied at Boston University, where she received a BA degree in 1989. She earned a Master of Philosophy degree in 1997 and a PhD degree in 2003 at The George Washington University.

At the Museum of African American History and Culture, she initiated the acquisition of the contents of Mae Reeves' millinery store in Philadelphia to the Smithsonian's collection. In 2016 Moresi initiated the acquisition of the contents of the Falls Church, Virginia campaign office for Barack Obama's presidential election campaign to the museum's collection.

In 2017 she was a co-curator, with Aaron Bryant, of More Than a Picture: Selections from the Photography Collection at the NMAAHC.

With Tanya Sheehan and Laura Coyle, she authored Pictures With Purpose: Early Photographs from the National Museum of African American History and Culture.
