= Pillbox hat =

Style of hat

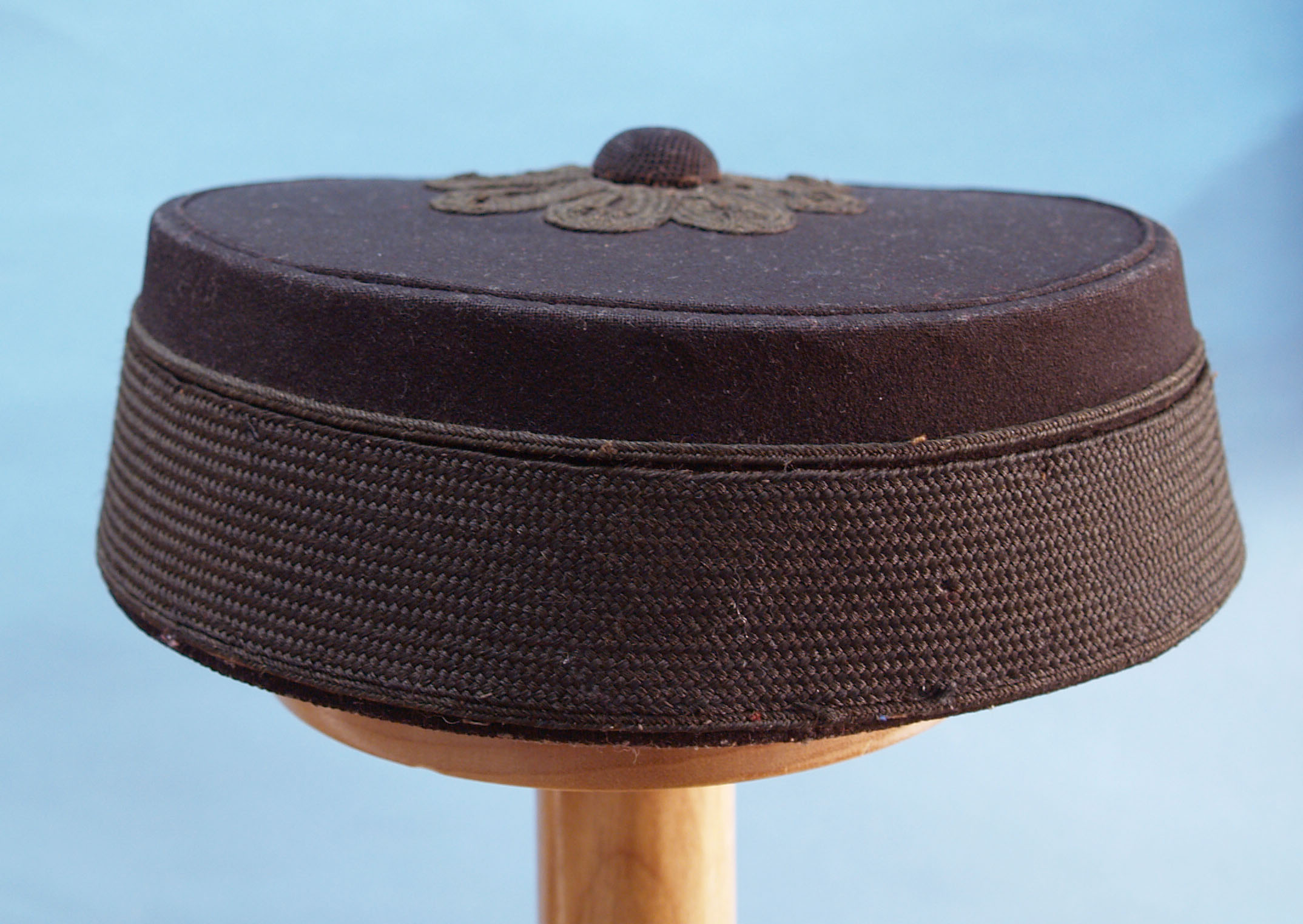
Military pillbox hat, New Zealand, 1885

A pillbox hat is a small hat with a flat crown, straight, upright sides, and no brim. It is named after the small cylindrical or hexagonal cases that were used for storing or carrying a small number of pills.

== History and description ==
=== Military headgear ===
Historically, the pillbox hat began as a form of military headgear. During the late Roman Empire, the pileus pannonicus or "Pannonian cap", a type of headgear similar to the modern pillbox, was worn by Roman soldiers. A similar hat was popular with the Flemish in the Middle Ages. In the 19th century pillboxes were worn by the units of the British Army and its overseas possessions as well as by the Boys Brigade. In some countries, especially those of the Commonwealth of Nations, a pillbox-like forage cap, often with a chin strap, can still be seen on ceremonial occasions. The Royal Military College of Canada dress uniform includes such a hat, and similar caps were standard issue for the Victorian era British Army. Another cap called a kilmarnock is a modern version of the traditional headdress worn by members of virtually all Gurkha regiments. The Women's Royal Air Force also wore pillbox hats during the Cold War

=== Fashion headgear ===
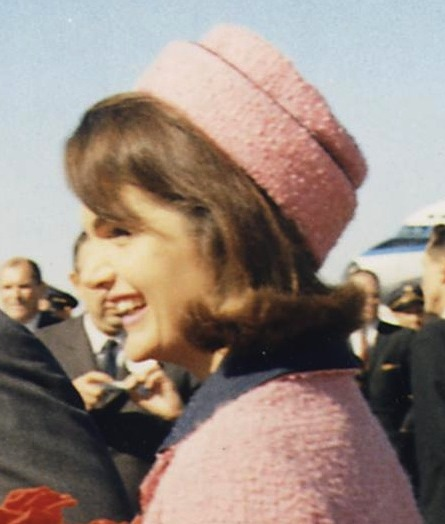
Jacqueline Kennedy arriving in Dallas on 22 November 1963

The modern woman's pillbox hat was created by milliners in the 1930s, and gained popularity due to its elegant simplicity. Pillbox hats were made out of wool, velvet, organdy, mink, lynx or fox fur, and leopard skin, among many other materials. They were generally designed in solid colors and were unaccessorized, but could include a veil.

Jacqueline Kennedy, First Lady of the United States from 1961 to 1963, was well known for her "signature pillbox hats", designed for her by Halston, and was wearing a pink one to match her pink Chanel suit on the day of her husband United States President John F. Kennedy's assassination in Dallas, Texas. Actress Natalie Portman wore a pillbox hat to play Kennedy in the 2016 biographical drama Jackie.

== In Baseball ==
In the mid to late 1800’s the “pillbox” hat made an appearance in baseball; a round-crowned wool cap, with horizontal stripes and a flat button top. In 1976 the pillbox hat also appeared on the heads of the Pittsburgh Pirates, a throwback to baseball’s earlier days.

== In popular culture ==
Pillbox hats are a satirical subject of the song "Leopard-Skin Pill-Box Hat" by Bob Dylan which first appeared on his 1966 album Blonde on Blonde.

== Gallery ==
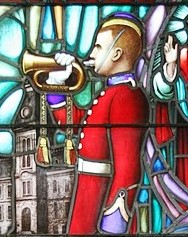
Military pillbox on stained glass window in the Royal Military College of Canada

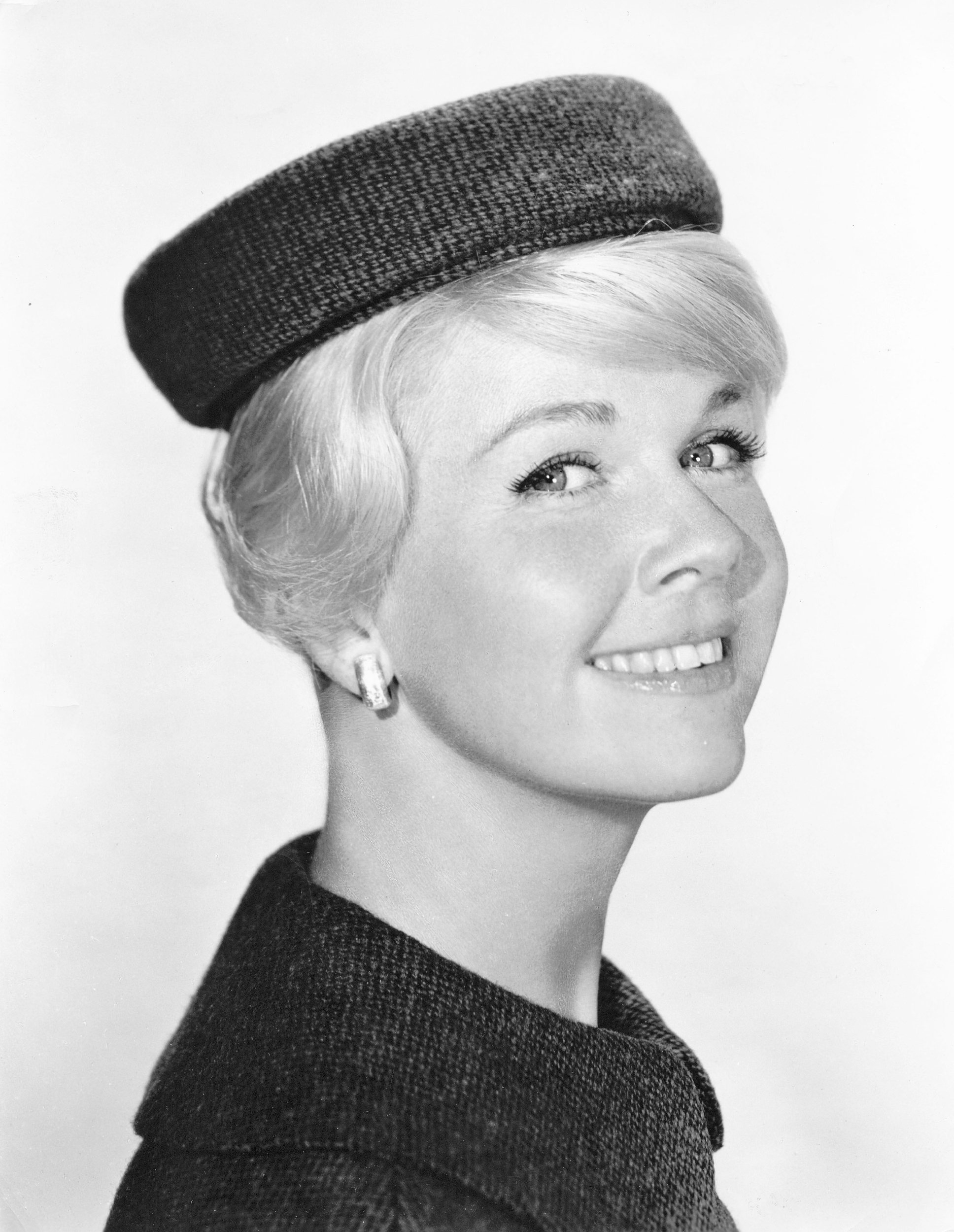
Doris Day in a pillbox hat

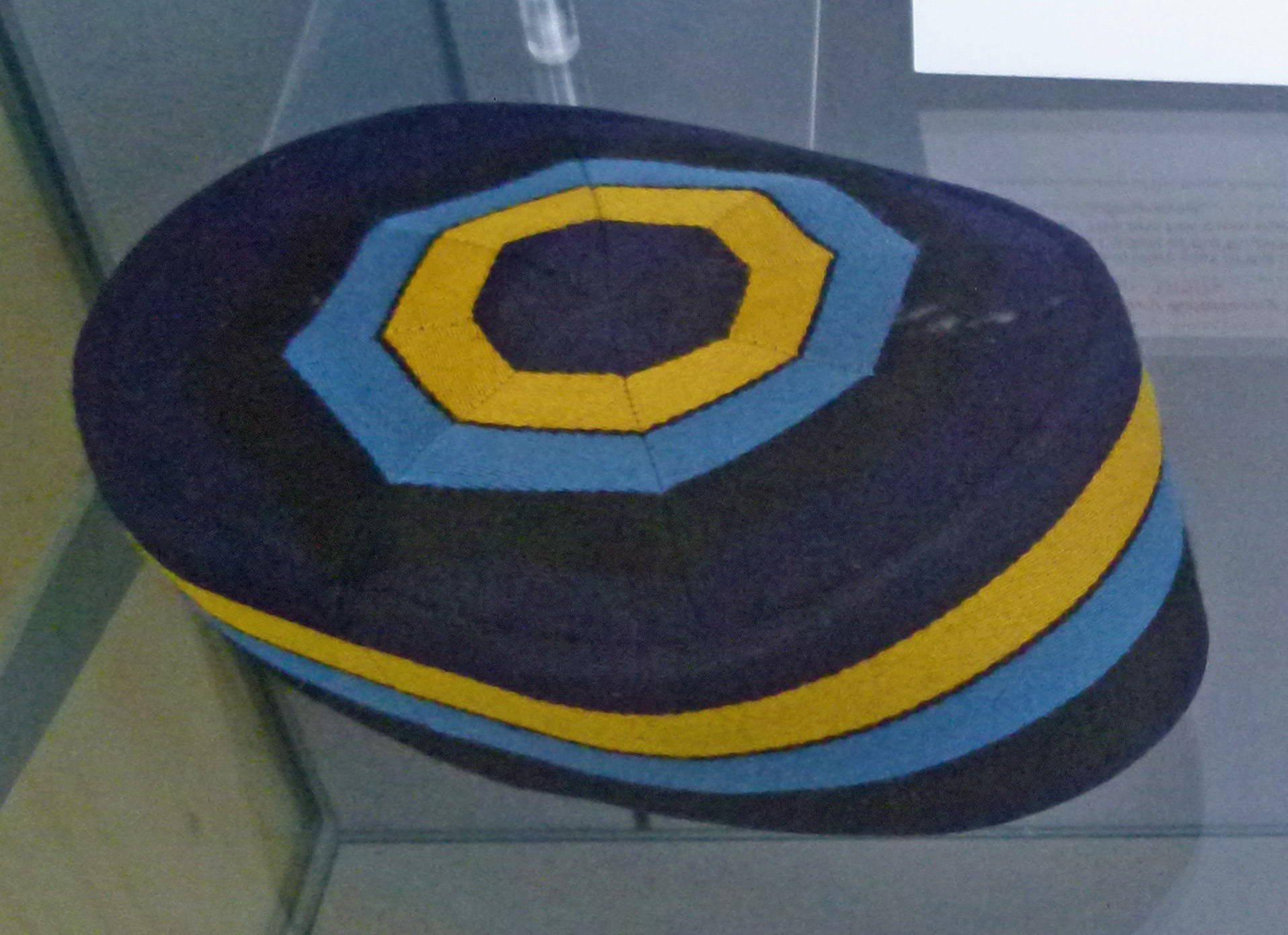
Pillbox worn by cadets at the Royal Military Academy, Woolwich.

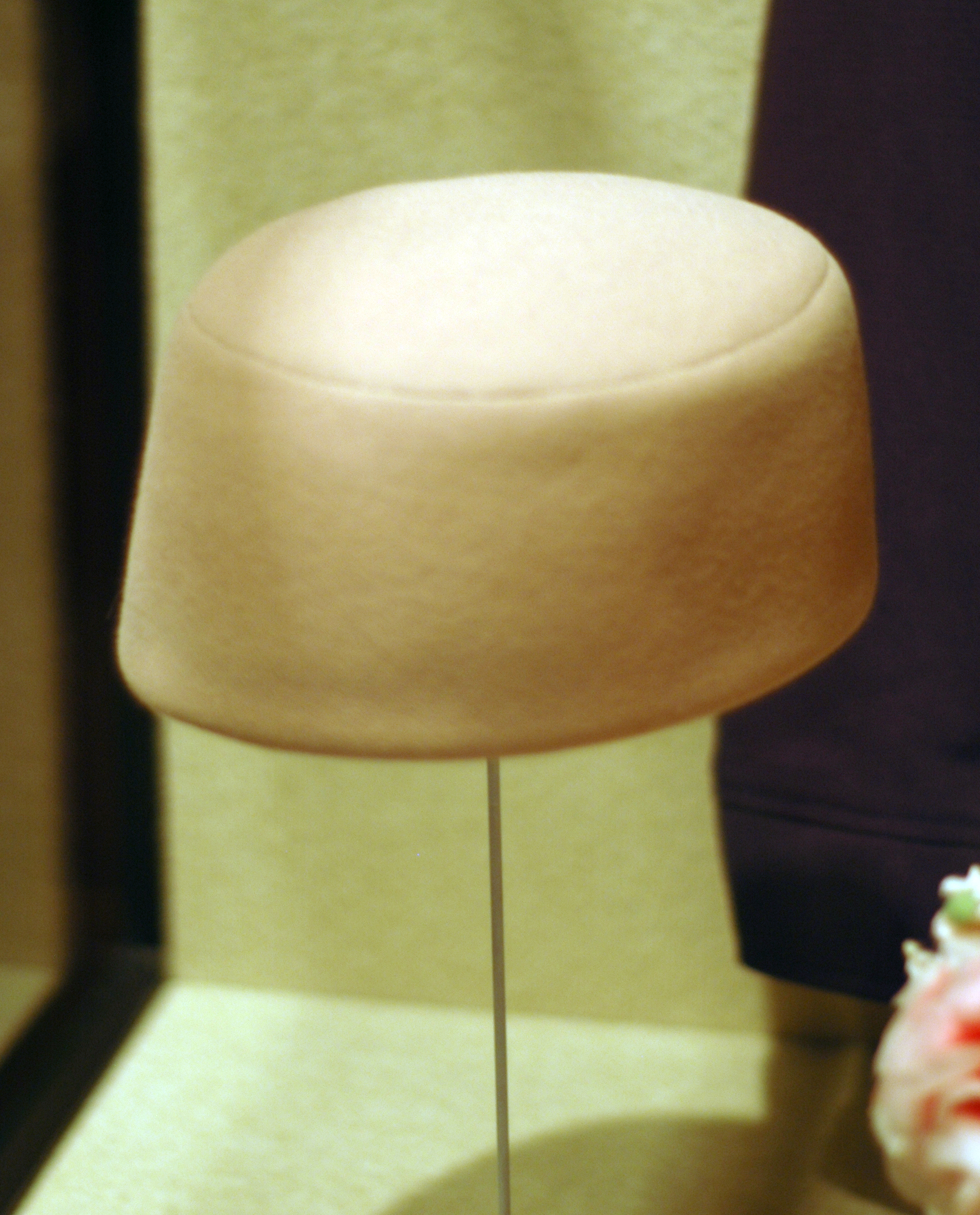
Pillbox owned by Jackie Kennedy in the Truman Museum

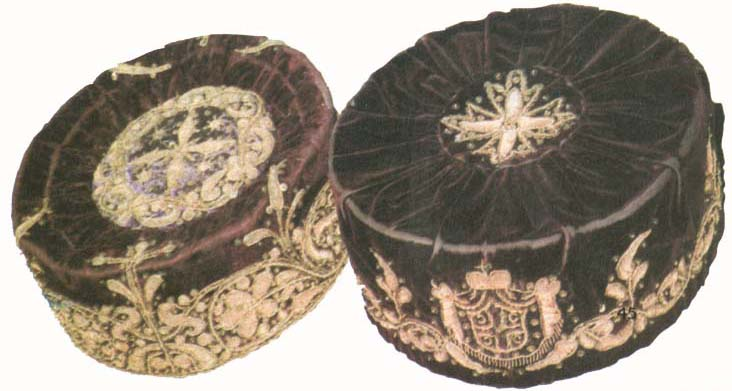
Royal pillboxes of Queen Milena and King Nikola of Montenegro

== See also ==
- List of hat styles
- Bell-boy hat
- Pillbox (military)
- Lika cap
