= Hat =

Shaped head covering

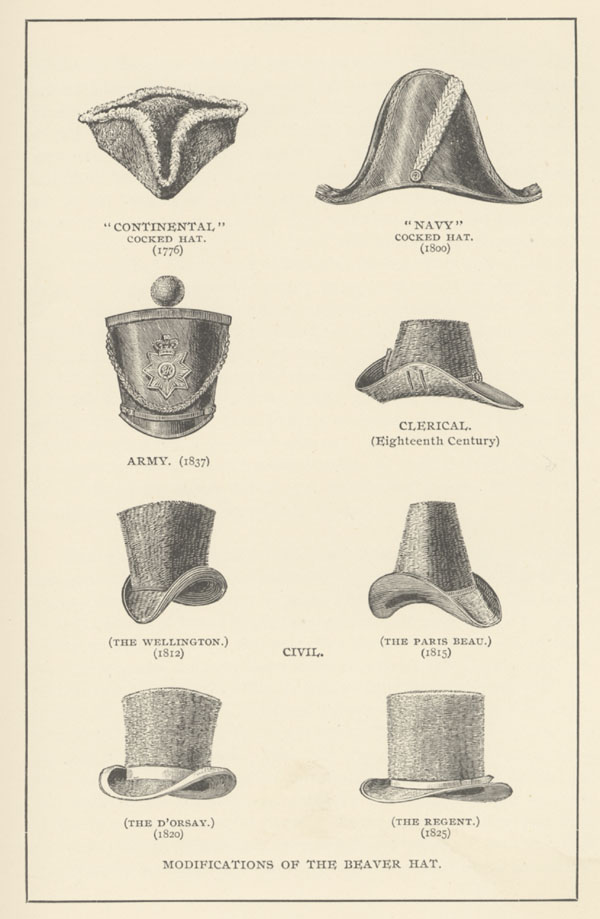
A collection of 18th and 19th centuries men's beaver felt hats

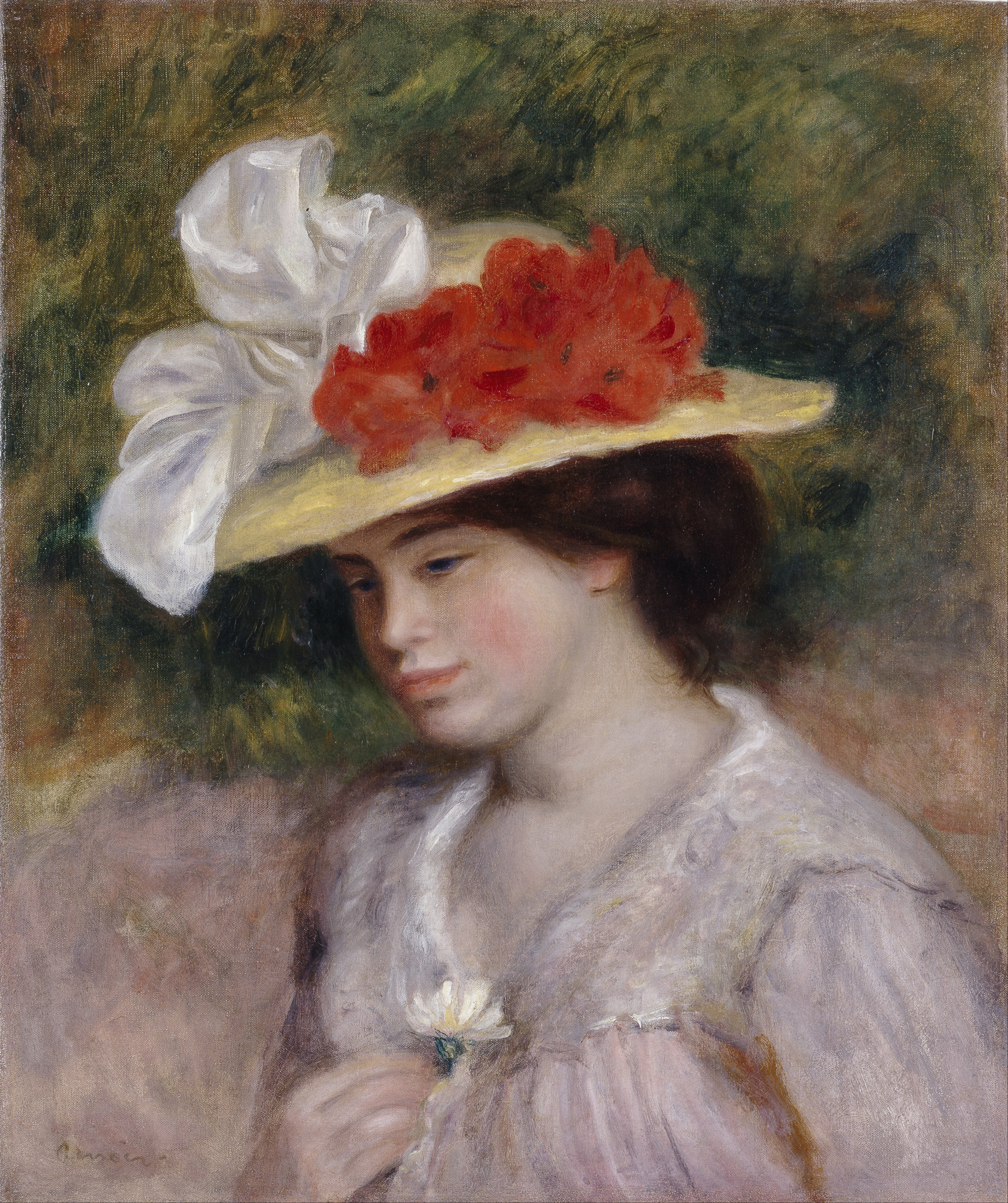
Woman in a Flowered Hat (1889), by Pierre-Auguste Renoir: Straw hat with brim decorated with cloth flowers and ribbons

A hat is a head covering which is worn for various reasons, including protection against weather conditions, ceremonial reasons such as university graduation, religious reasons, comedy, safety, or as a fashion accessory. Hats which incorporate mechanical features, such as visors, spikes, flaps, braces or beer holders shade into the broader category of headgear.

In the past, hats were an indicator of social status. In the military, hats may denote nationality, branch of service, rank or regiment. Police typically wear distinctive hats such as peaked caps or brimmed hats, such as those worn by the Royal Canadian Mounted Police. Some hats have a protective function. As examples, the hard hat protects construction workers' heads from injury by falling objects, a British police Custodian helmet protects the officer's head, a sun hat shades the face and shoulders from the sun, a cowboy hat protects against sun and rain and an ushanka fur hat with fold-down earflaps keeps the head and ears warm. Some hats are worn for ceremonial purposes, such as the mortarboard, which is worn (or carried) during university graduation ceremonies. Some hats are worn by members of a certain profession, such as the Toque worn by chefs, or the mitre worn by Christian bishops. Adherents of certain religions regularly wear hats, such as the turban worn by Sikhs, or the church hat that is worn as a headcovering by Christian women during prayer and worship.

== History ==
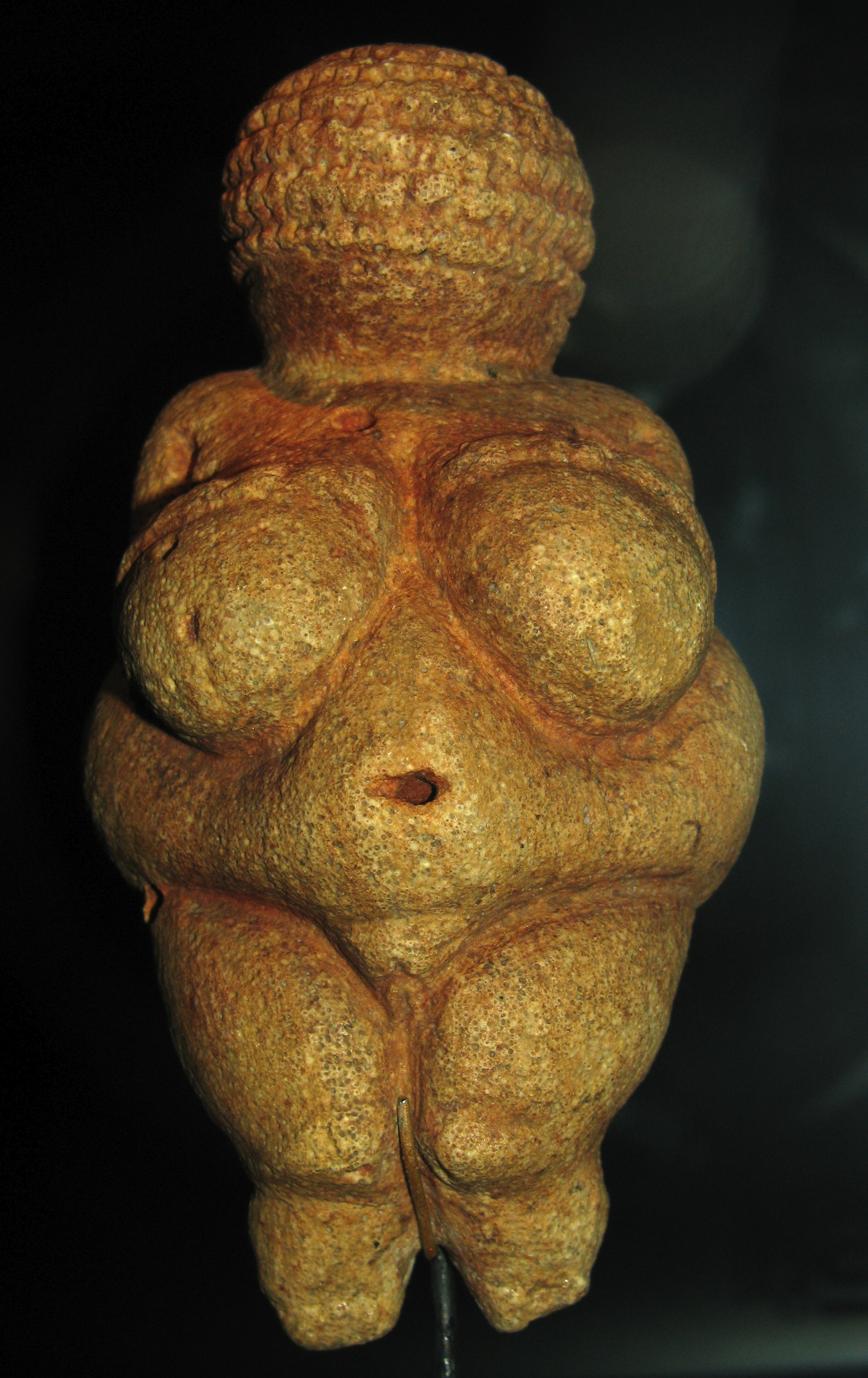
The 27,000-to-30,000-year-old Venus of Willendorf may depict a woman wearing a woven hat.

While there are not many official records of hats before 3,000 BC, they probably were commonplace before that. The 27,000-to-30,000-year-old Venus of Willendorf figurine may depict a woman wearing a woven hat. One of the earliest known confirmed hats was worn by a Bronze Age man (nicknamed Ötzi) whose body (including his hat) was found frozen in a mountain between Austria and Italy, where he had been since around 3250 BC. He was found wearing a bearskin cap with a chin strap, made of several hides stitched together, essentially resembling a Russian fur hat without the flaps.

One of the first pictorial depictions of a hat appears in a tomb painting from Thebes, Egypt, which shows a man wearing a conical straw hat, dated to around 3200 BC. Hats were commonly worn in ancient Egypt. Many upper-class Egyptians shaved their heads, then covered it in a headdress intended to help them keep cool. Ancient Mesopotamians often wore conical hats or ones shaped somewhat like an inverted vase.

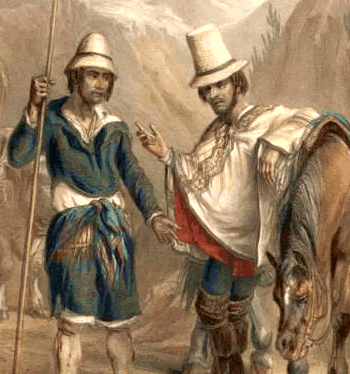
Hats as an indicator of social status: a foreman (with horse) wears a hat of greater height than the accompanying inquilino (1821 Chile).

Other early hats include the Pileus, a simple skull-like cap; the Phrygian cap, worn by freed slaves in Greece and Rome (which became iconic in America during the Revolutionary War and the French Revolution, as a symbol of the struggle for liberty against the Monarchy); and the Greek petasos, the first known hat with a brim. Women wore veils, kerchiefs, hoods, caps and wimples.

Like Ötzi, the Tollund Man was preserved to the present day with a hat on, probably having died around 400 BC in a Danish bog, which mummified him. He wore a pointed cap made of sheepskin and wool, fastened under the chin by a hide strap.

St. Clement, the patron saint of felt hatmakers, is said to have discovered felt when he filled his sandals with flax fibers to protect his feet, around 800 AD.

In the Middle Ages, hats were a marker of social status and used to single out certain groups. The 1215 Fourth Council of the Lateran required that all Jews identify themselves by wearing the Judenhat ("Jewish hat"), marking them as targets for antisemitism. The hats were usually yellow and were either pointed or square.

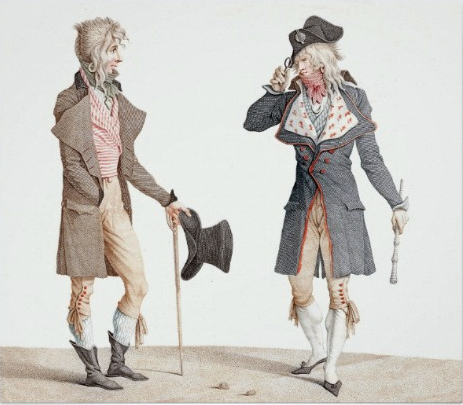
Carle Vernet's 1796 painting showing two decadent French "Incredibles" greeting each other, one with what appears to be a top hat, perhaps its first recorded appearance.

In the Middle Ages, hats for women ranged from simple scarves to elaborate hennin, and denoted social status. Structured hats for women similar to those of male courtiers began to be worn in the late 16th century. The term 'milliner' comes from the Italian city of Milan, where the best quality hats were made in the 18th century. Millinery was traditionally a woman's occupation, with the milliner not only creating hats and bonnets but also choosing lace, trimmings and accessories to complete an outfit.

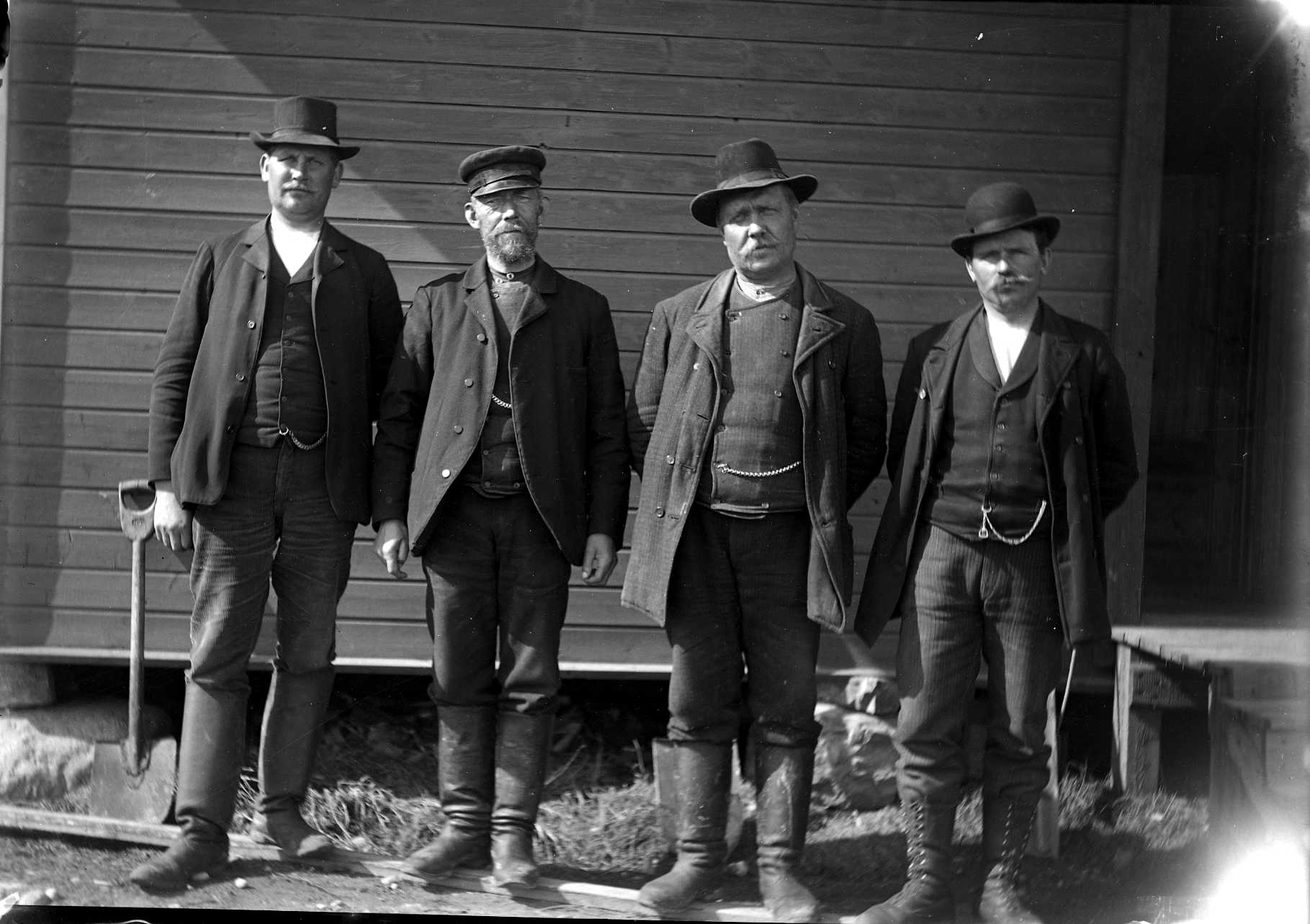
Left-to-right: Top-hat, peaked cap, Borsalino, bowler hat (Sweden, early 20th century).

In the first half of the 19th century, women wore bonnets that gradually became larger, decorated with ribbons, flowers, feathers, and gauze trims. By the end of the century, many other styles were introduced, among them hats with wide brims and flat crowns, the flower pot and the toque. By the middle of the 1920s, when women began to cut their hair short, they chose hats that hugged the head like a helmet.

The tradition of wearing hats to horse racing events began at the Royal Ascot in Britain, which maintains a strict dress code. All guests in the Royal Enclosure must wear hats. This tradition was adopted at other horse racing events, such as the Kentucky Derby in the United States.

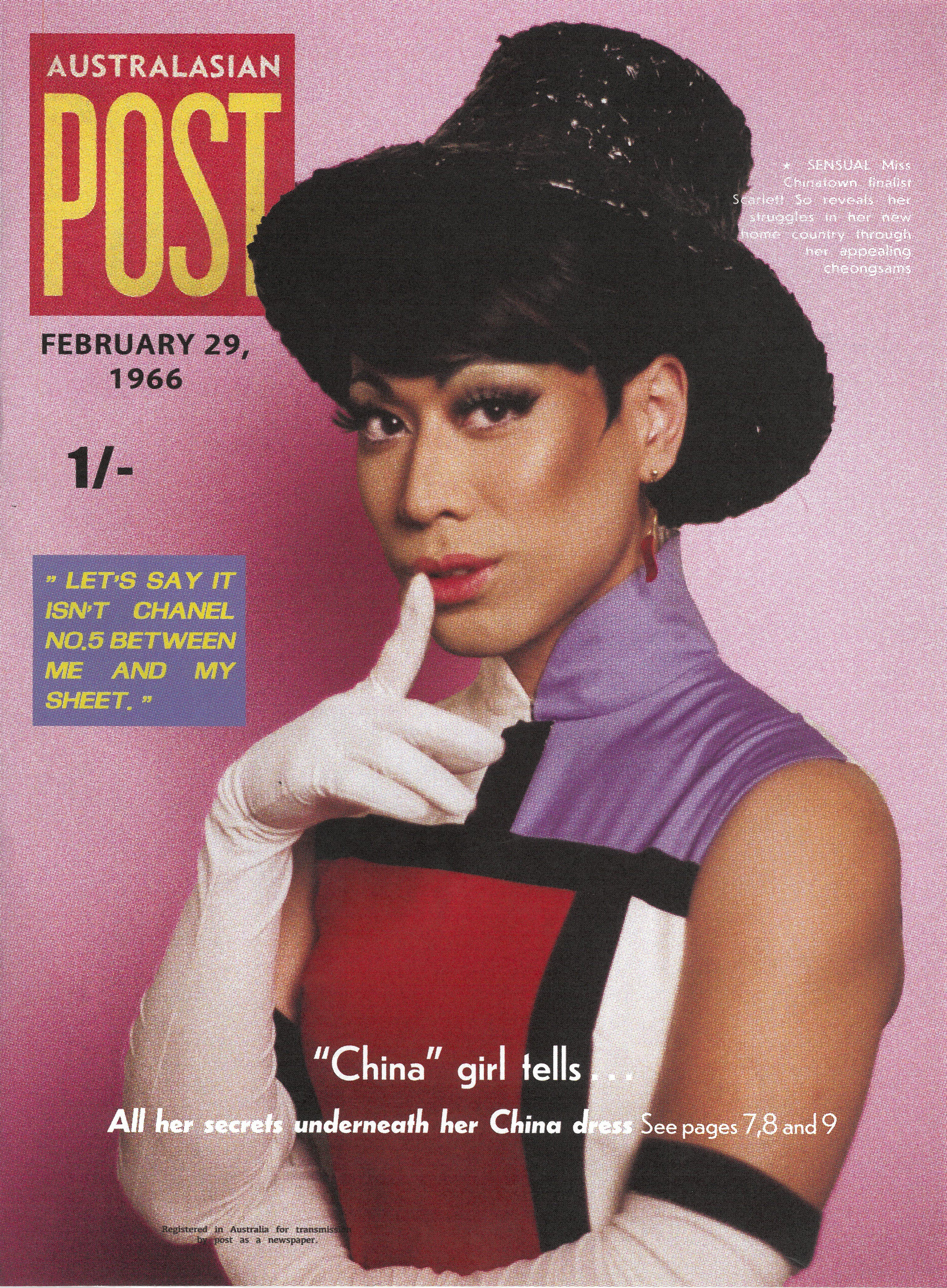
Cover of Australasian Post with Miss Chinatown finalist Scarlett So wearing a Christian Dior hat in the 1960s

Extravagant hats were popular in the 1980s, and in the early 21st century, flamboyant hats made a comeback, with a new wave of competitive young milliners designing creations that include turban caps, trompe-l'œil-effect felt hats and tall headpieces made of human hair. Some new hat collections have been described as "wearable sculpture". Many pop stars, among them Lady Gaga, have commissioned hats as publicity stunts.

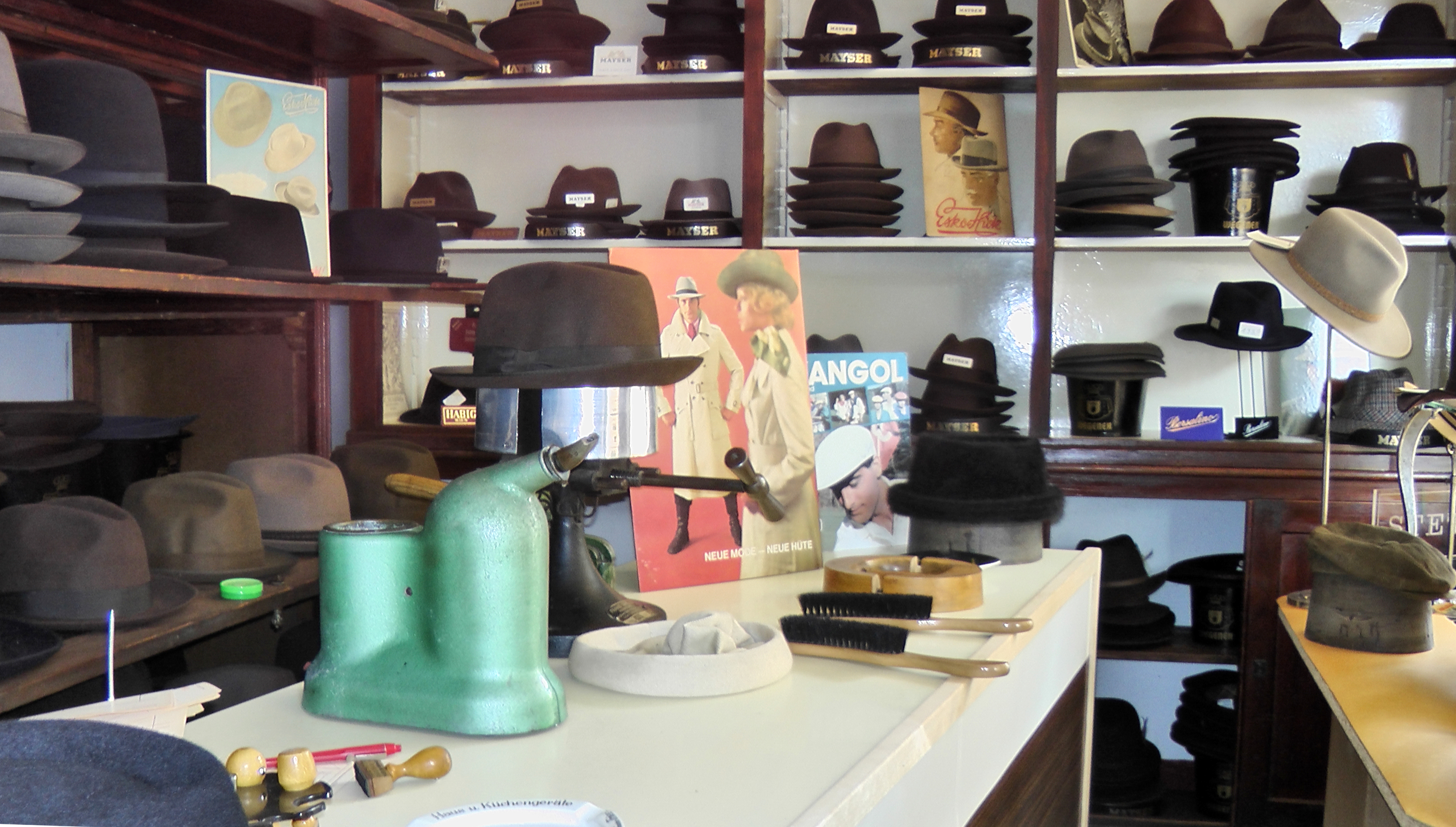
A hat shop from about 1900 inside the Roscheider Hof Open Air Museum.

== Etiquette ==
In Western societies, it has been traditional for men to remove their hats when entering a Christian church—a practice derived from 1 Corinthians 11 in the Bible. On the other hand, women historically were required to wear a headcovering when entering a church (a practice that decreased in the West in the 1960s, though it still occurs in the East). (Note: In the West, certain denominations of Christianity preserved the practice of the headcovering of women during, chiefly Conservative Anabaptist fellowships and Old Order Anabaptist groups, as well as by certain Eastern Orthodox and Oriental Orthodox congregations. In the 21st century, the wearing of a headcovering by women during Mass and while praying at home has increased in the West, especially among Roman Catholics and Evangelical-Lutherans.) Historically, men in Western Christian societies removed their hat when entering a room where women were present, as well as when a national flag is paraded. Men traditionally remove their hats when a funeral passes through an area in which they are present. Who uncovered for whom marked the social hierarchy and whose authority was recognized or not. Until World War I, it was customary for women to wear a cap on her head, and women were rarely seen in public without one.

== Parts ==
Hats are very varied, but the parts of many hats can be described as the crown, the top section; the brim, a projecting rim around the hat below the crown; and often a band or hatband wrapped around the crown just above the brim.

== Famous hatmakers ==
One of the most famous London hatters is James Lock & Co. of St James's Street. The shop claims to be the oldest operating hat shop in the world. Another was Sharp & Davis of 6 Fish Street Hill. In the late 20th century, museums credited London-based David Shilling with reinventing hats worldwide. Notable Belgian hat designers are Elvis Pompilio and Fabienne Delvigne (Royal warrant of appointment holder), whose hats are worn by European royals. Philip Treacy OBE is an Irish milliner whose hats have been commissioned by top designers and worn at royal weddings. In North America, the well-known cowboy-hat manufacturer Stetson made the headgear for the Royal Canadian Mounted Police and the Texas Rangers. John Cavanagh was one of the notable American hatters. Italian hat maker Borsalino has covered the heads of Hollywood stars and the world's rich and famous.

== Collections ==
The Philippi Collection is a collection of religious headgear assembled by a German entrepreneur, Dieter Philippi, located in Kirkel. The collection features over 500 hats, and is currently the world's largest collection of clerical, ecclesiastical and religious head coverings.

== Styles ==
This is a short list of some common and iconic examples of hats. A longer version can be found at List of hat styles.

Image	Name	Description
Ascot cap	Ascot cap	A hard, men's cap, similar to the flat cap, but distinguished by its hardness and rounded shape
Balmoral bonnet	Balmoral bonnet	Traditional Scottish bonnet or cap worn with Scottish Highland dress
Baseball cap	Baseball cap	A type of soft, light, wool or cotton cap with a rounded crown and a stiff, frontward-projecting brim
Propeller beanie with a visor	Beanie (North America)	A brimless cap, made from triangular panels of material joined by a button at the crown and seamed together around the sides, with or without a small visor, once popular among schoolboys. Sometimes includes a propeller. In New Zealand, Australia, the United Kingdom and some parts of the United States, beanie refers to the knit cap.
Bearskin	Bearskin	The tall, furry hat of the Brigade of Guards' full-dress uniform, originally designed to protect them against sword-cuts, etc. Commonly seen at Buckingham Palace in London, England. Sometimes mistakenly identified as a busby.
Beret	Beret	A soft, round cap, usually of woollen felt, with a bulging flat crown and tight-fitting brimless headband. Worn by both men and women and traditionally associated with Basque people, France, and the military.
Bicorne	Bicorne	A broad-brimmed, felt hat with brim folded up and pinned front and back to create a long-horned shape. Also known as a cocked hat. Worn by European military officers in the 1790s and, as illustrated, commonly associated with Napoleon.
Bowler / Derby	Bowler / Derby	A hard, felt hat with a rounded crown, created in 1850 by Lock's of St James's, the hatters to Thomas Coke, 2nd Earl of Leicester, for his servants. More commonly known as a derby in the United States.
Buntal	Buntal	A traditional straw hat from the Philippines woven from fibers extracted from buri palms
Chullo	Chullo	Peruvian or Bolivian hat with ear-flaps made from vicuña, alpaca, llama or sheep's wool
Cloche hat	Cloche hat	A bell-shaped ladies' hat that was popular during the Roaring Twenties (Cloche hat as worn by silent film star Vilma Bánky, 1927)
Cricket cap	Cricket cap	A type of soft cap traditionally worn by cricket players (Sid Barnes with his Australian cap)
Sombrero cordobés	Cordovan hat	A traditional flat-brimmed and flat-topped hat originating from Córdoba, Spain, associated with flamenco dancing and music and popularized by characters such as Zorro
Conical hat	Conical Asian hat	A conical straw hat associated with East and Southeast Asia. Sometimes known as a "coolie hat", although the term "coolie" may be interpreted as derogatory.
Coonskin cap	Coonskin cap	A hat of the indigenous peoples of the Appalachian region, fashioned from the skin and fur of a raccoon, that became associated with Canadian and American frontiersmen of the 18th and 19th centuries
	Cowboy hat	A high-crowned, wide-brimmed hat, with a sweatband on the inside, and a decorative hat band on the outside. Early models such as the Boss of the Plains could be customized by creasing the crown and rolling the brim.
Custodian helmet	Custodian helmet	A helmet traditionally worn by British police constables while on foot patrol
Deerstalker	Deerstalker	A warm, close-fitting tweed cap, with brims front and behind and ear-flaps that can be tied together either over the crown or under the chin. Originally designed for use while hunting in the climate of Scotland. Worn by – and so closely associated with – the character Sherlock Holmes.
	Fedora	A soft, felt hat with a medium brim and lengthwise crease in the crown
	Fez	Red felt hat in the shape of a truncated cone, common to Arab-speaking countries
	Fulani hat	A conical, plant-fiber hat covered in leather both at the brim and top, worn by men of the Fulani people in West Africa
	Hard hat	A rounded, rigid helmet with a small brim, predominantly used in workplace environments, such as construction sites, to protect the head from injury by falling objects, debris and bad weather
	Homburg	A semi-formal hat of fur felt, with a single dent running down the centre of the crown, a wide silk grosgrain hatband ribbon, a flat brim shaped in a "pencil curl", and a ribbon-bound trim about the edge of the brim (Winston Churchill wearing a homburg)
	Keffiyeh	Three piece ensemble consisting of a thagiyah skullcap, gutrah scarf, and agal black cord. Gutrahs are plain white or patterned, denoting ethnic or national identities.. (Sultan bin Abdulaziz, Crown Prince of Saudi Arabia wearing Keffiyeh)
	Kippah	A hemispherical cap worn by Jews to fulfill the customary requirement held by halachic authorities that the head be covered at all times (IDF soldier, Lt. Asael Lubotzky, prays with kippah and tefillin.)
	Knit cap	A knitted hat, worn in winter, usually made from wool or acrylic. In New Zealand, Australia, the United Kingdom and some parts of the United States, the term beanie is applied to this cap, while in Canada it is known as a tuque.
	Kufi	A brimless, short, rounded cap worn by Africans and people throughout the African diaspora (Umaru Yar'Adua, President of Nigeria)
	Mitre	Distinctive hat worn by bishops in the Roman Catholic Church, Eastern Orthodox Church, the Lutheran Churches and the Anglican Communion (Pope Benedict XVI)
	Montera	A crocheted hat worn by bullfighters
	Panama	Straw hat made in Ecuador
	Phrygian cap	A soft conical cap, pulled forward. In sculpture, paintings and caricatures it represents freedom and the pursuit of liberty. The popular cartoon characters the Smurfs wear white or red Phrygian caps.
Actress Doris Day wearing a pillbox hat in 1960	Pillbox hat	A small hat with straight, upright sides, a flat crown, and no brim. (Actress Doris Day wearing a pillbox hat in 1960)
	Pith helmet	A lightweight, rigid, cloth-covered helmet made of cork or pith, with brims front and back. Worn by Europeans in tropical colonies in the 1800s.
	Rastacap	A tall, round, usually crocheted and brightly colored cap worn by Rastafarians and others with dreadlocks to tuck their locks away
	Rogatywka	An asymmetrical, peaked, four-pointed cap used by various Polish military units throughout the ages
	Santa hat	A floppy, pointed, red stocking cap, trimmed in white fur, traditionally associated with Christmas
	Sombrero	A Mexican hat with a conical crown and a very wide, saucer-shaped brim, highly embroidered and made of plush felt
	Tam o'Shanter	A traditional flat, round Scottish cap usually worn by men (in the British military sometimes abbreviated ToS)
	Top hat	Also known as a beaver hat, a magician's hat, or, in the case of the tallest examples, a stovepipe hat. A tall, flat-crowned, cylindrical hat worn by men in the 19th and early 20th centuries, now worn only with morning dress or evening dress. Cartoon characters Uncle Sam and Mr. Monopoly are often depicted wearing such hats. Once made from felted beaver fur.
	Toque	A tall, pleated, brimless, cylindrical hat, informally, known as a chef's hat
	Tricorne	A soft hat with a low crown and broad brim, pinned up on either side of the head and at the back, producing a triangular shape. Worn by Europeans in the 18th century. Larger, taller, and heavily ornamented brims were present in France and the Papal States.
	Turban	A headdress consisting of a scarf-like single piece of cloth wound around either the head itself or an inner hat
	Ushanka	A Russian fur hat with fold-down ear-flaps
	Zucchetto	Skullcap worn by clerics, typically in Roman Catholicism and Evangelical-Lutheranism

== Size ==
Hat sizes are determined by measuring the circumference of a person's head about 1 centimetre (2/5 in) above the ears. Inches or centimeters may be used depending on the manufacturer. Felt hats can be stretched for a custom fit. Some hats, like hard hats and baseball caps, are adjustable. Cheaper hats come in "standard sizes", such as small, medium, large, extra large: the mapping of measured size to the various "standard sizes" varies from maker to maker and style to style, as can be seen by studying various catalogues, such as Hammacher Schlemmer.

Hat sizes
size					Youth S/M	Youth L/XL	XXS	XS	S	M	L	XL	XXL	XXXL
Age (years)	0	1/2	1	1 1/2	2									
Circumference in cm	34	43	47	48	49	50	51–52	53–54	55–56	57–58	59–60	61–62	63–64	65–66
Circumference in inches	13 3/8	17	18 1/2	18 3/4	19 1/4	19 3/4	20 1/8–20 1/2	20 5/8–21 1/4	21 5/8–22	22 1/2–22 7/8	23 1/4–23 5/8	24–24 3/8	24 3/4–25 1/4	25–26
UK hat size			5	5 3/4	6–6 1/8	6 1/4–6 3/8	6 1/2–6 5/8	6 3/4–6 7/8	7–7 1/8	7 1/4–7 3/8	7 1/2–7 5/8	7 3/4–7 7/8	8–8 1/8	
US hat size			5 7/8	6	6 1/8	6 1/4	6 3/8–6 1/2	6 5/8–6 3/4	6 7/8–7	7 1/8–7 1/4	7 3/8–7 1/2	7 5/8–7 3/4	7 7/8–8	8 1/8–8 1/4
French hat size			0	1/2	1	1 1/2	2–2 1/2	3–3 1/2	4–4 1/2	5–5 1/2	6–6 1/2	7–7 1/2	8–8 1/2	9–9 1/2

US hat size is a measurement of head diameter in inches. It can be computed from a measurement of circumference in centimeters by dividing by 8, because multiplying 2.54 (the number of centimeters per inch) by π (the multiplier to give circumference from diameter) is almost exactly 8.

== Gallery ==
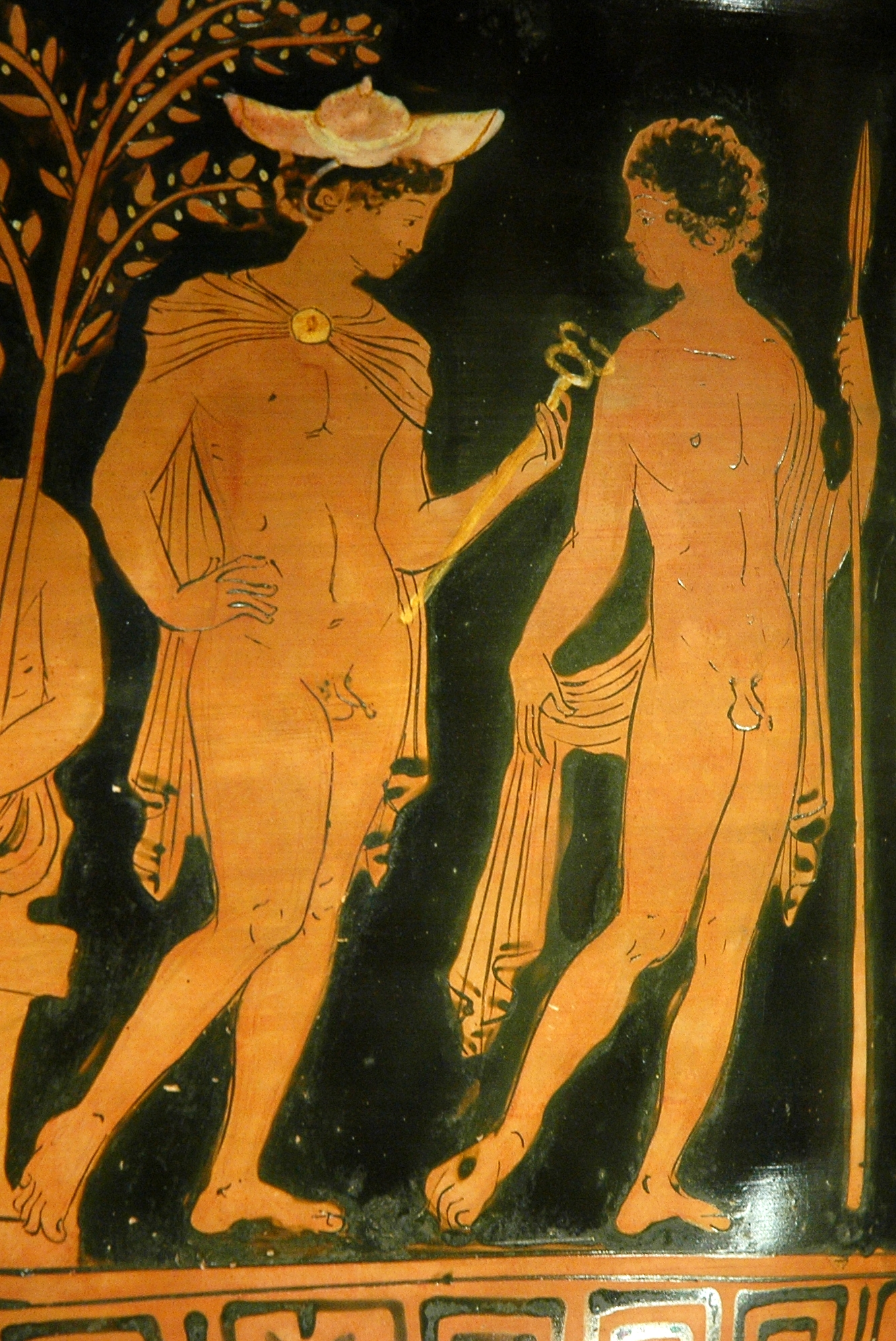
Hermes wearing a petasos hat, Attic red-figure krater, c. 380–370 BC

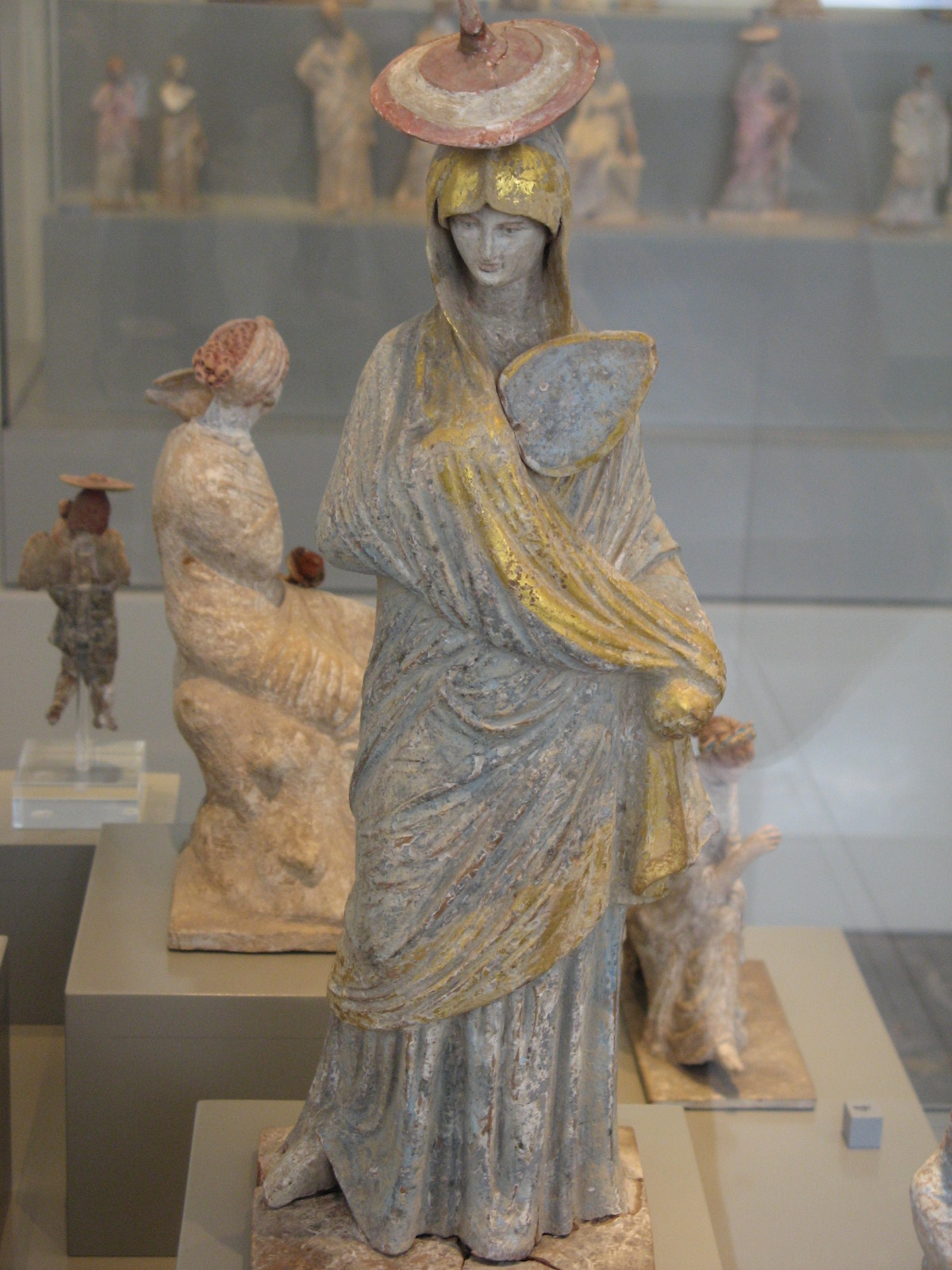
Ancient Greek statue of a lady with blue and gilt garment, a fan and a sun hat, from Tanagra, c. 325–300 BC

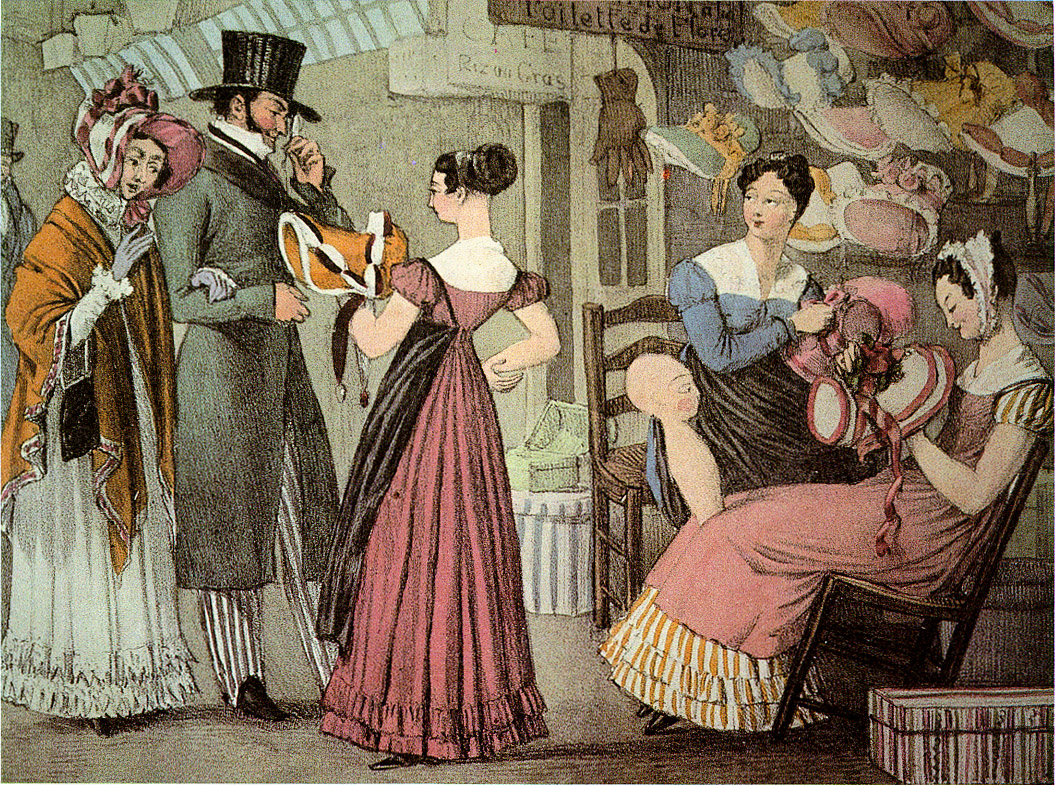
Paris millinery shop, France, 1822

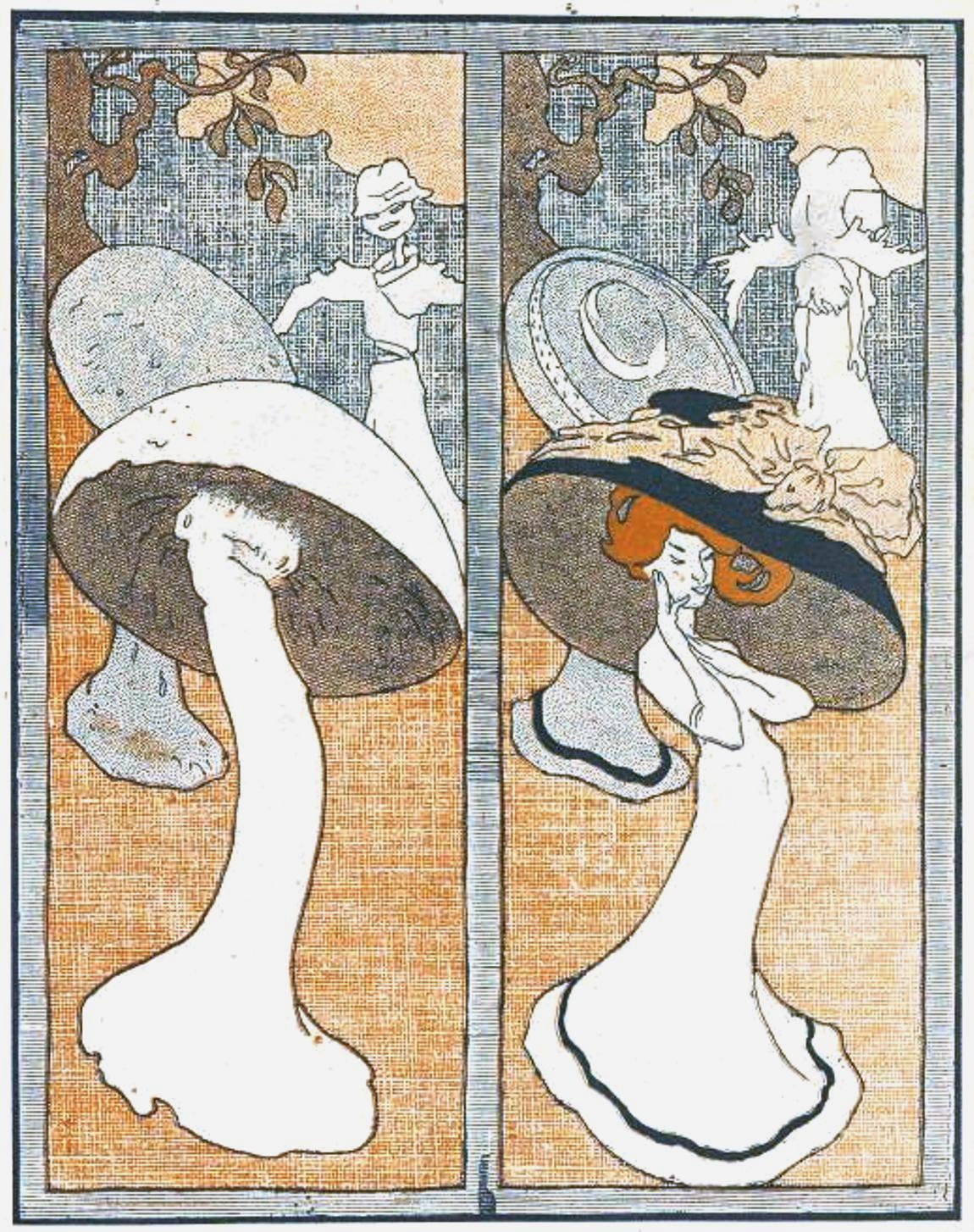
Hat fashions have sometimes been the subject of ridicule. This 1908 cartoon by Ion Theodorescu-Sion, which first appeared in a Romanian publication, satirised the popularity of mushroom hats.

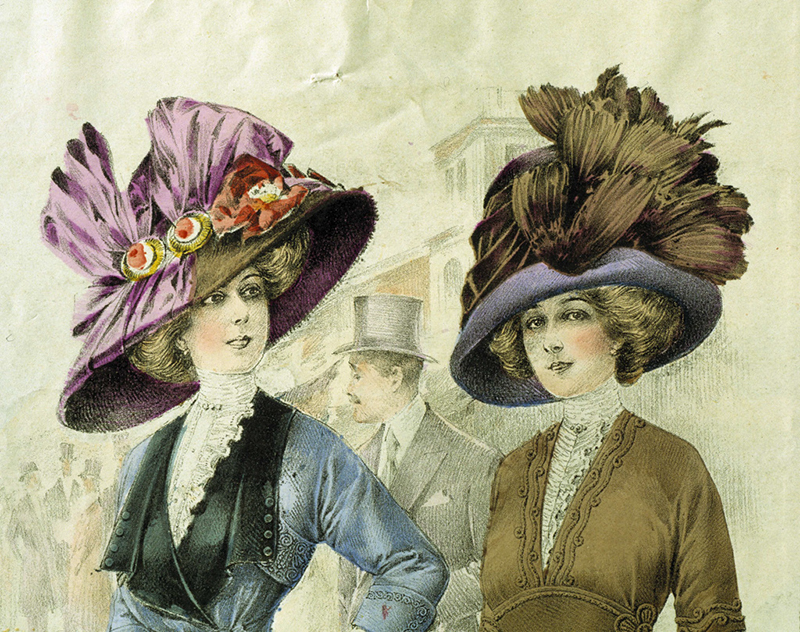
Women's picture hats from 1911.

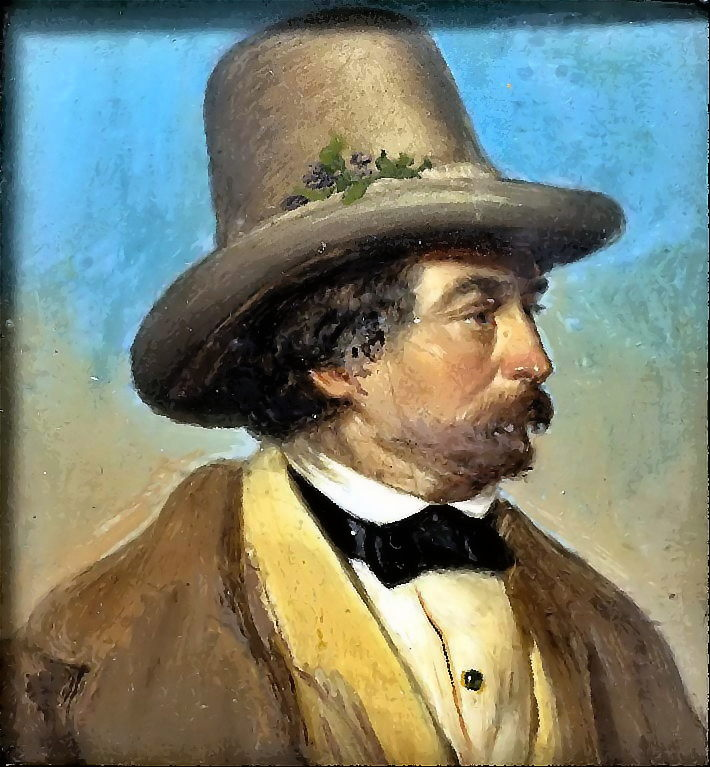
Mathias Schmid (Austria, 1835–1923). Man in a hat

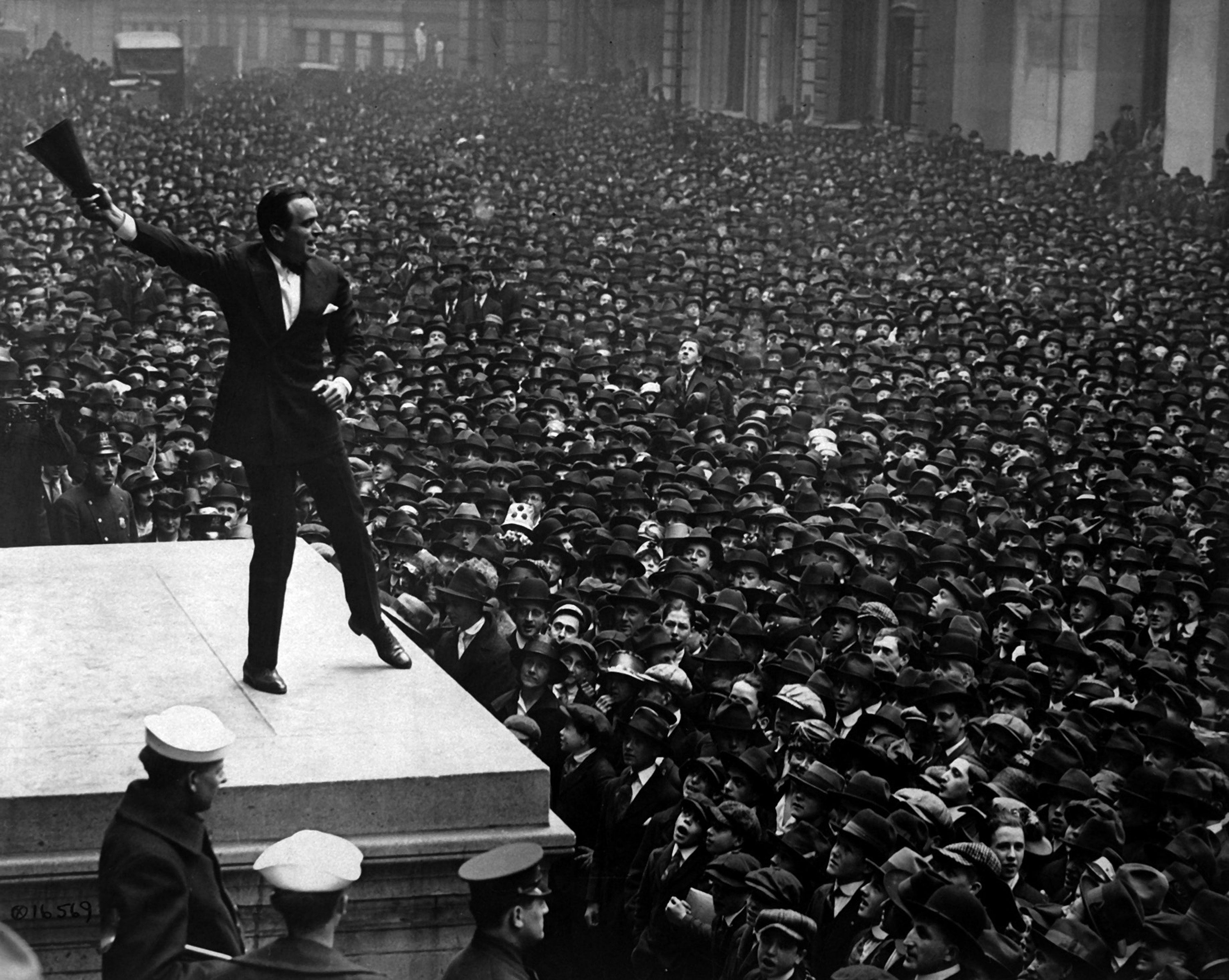
New York City, 1918: A large crowd of people, almost all wearing hats

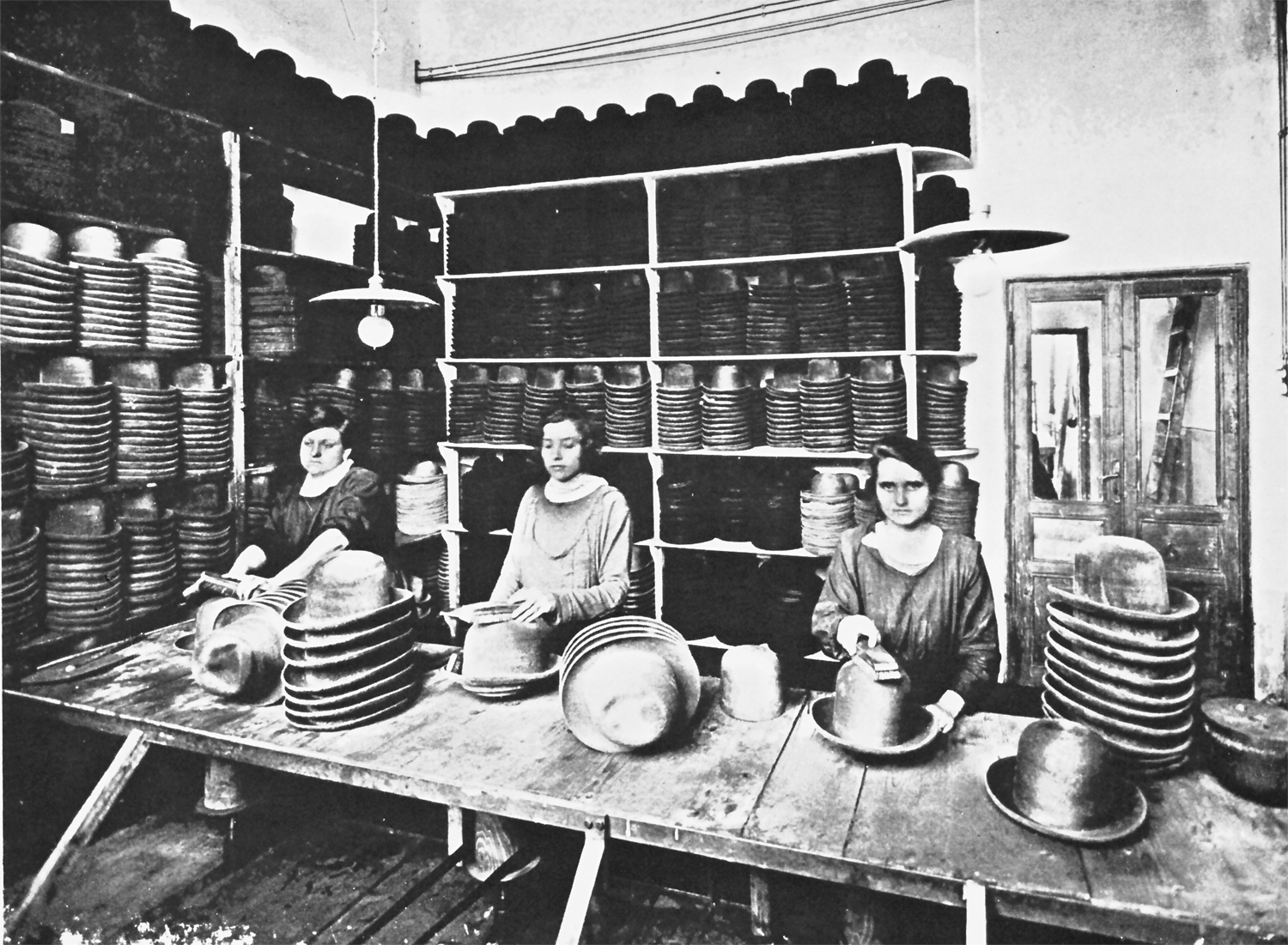
Family-owned hat factory in Montevarchi, Italy, date unknown

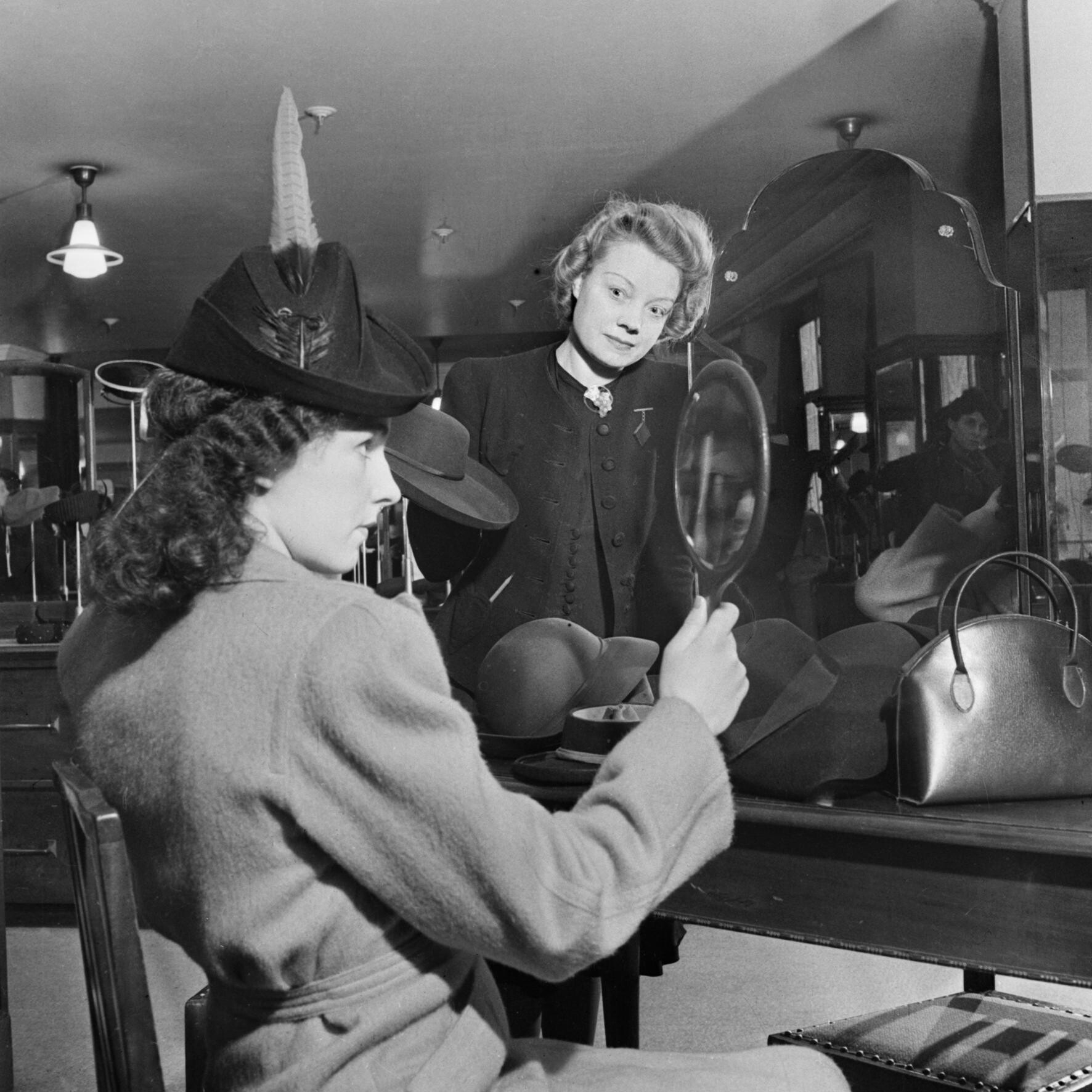
Millinery department of Bourne & Hollingsworth, in London's Oxford Street in 1942. Unlike most other clothing, hats were not strictly rationed in wartime Britain and there was an explosion of adventurous millinery styles.

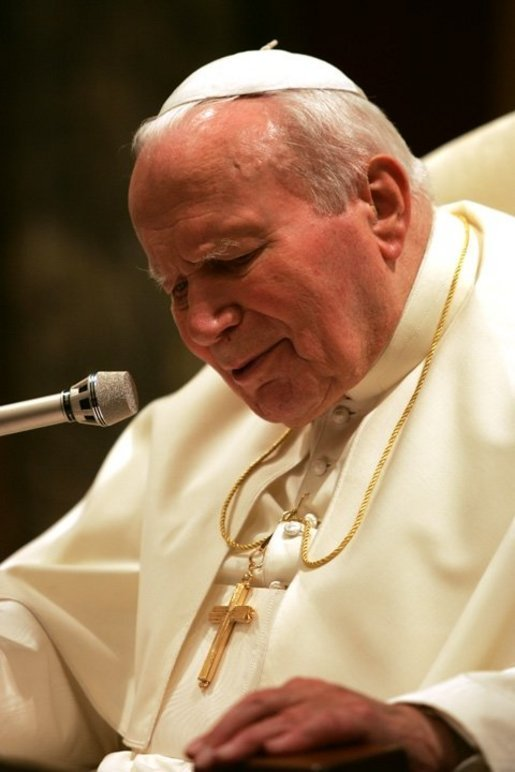
John Paul II wearing a zucchetto

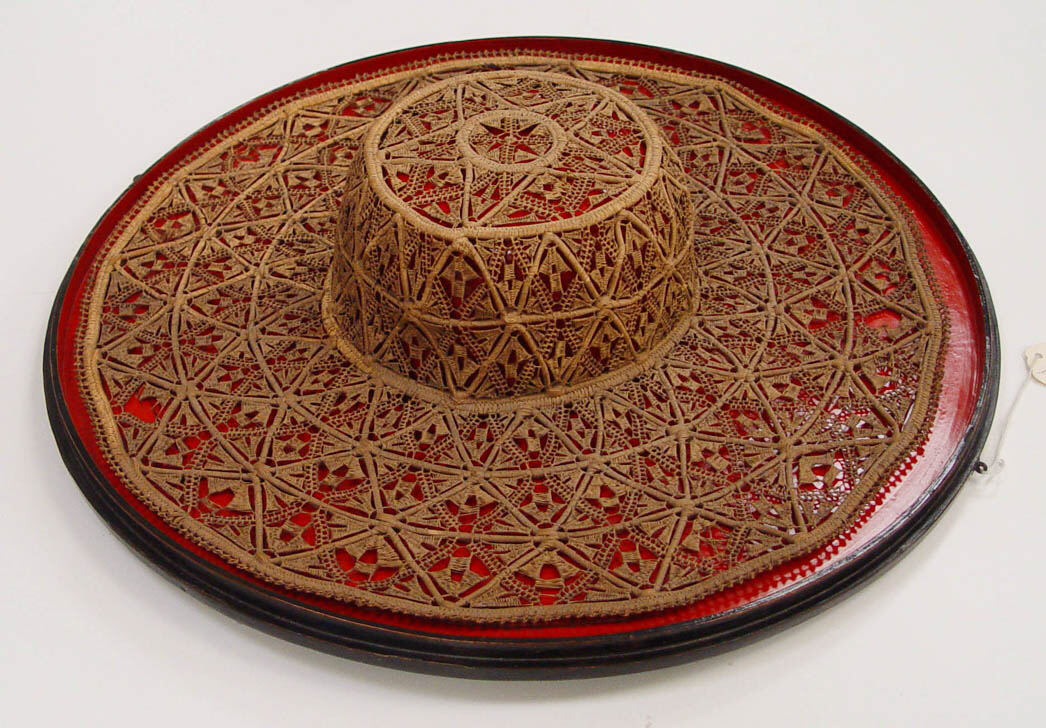
17th century openwork hat Metropolitan Museum of Art

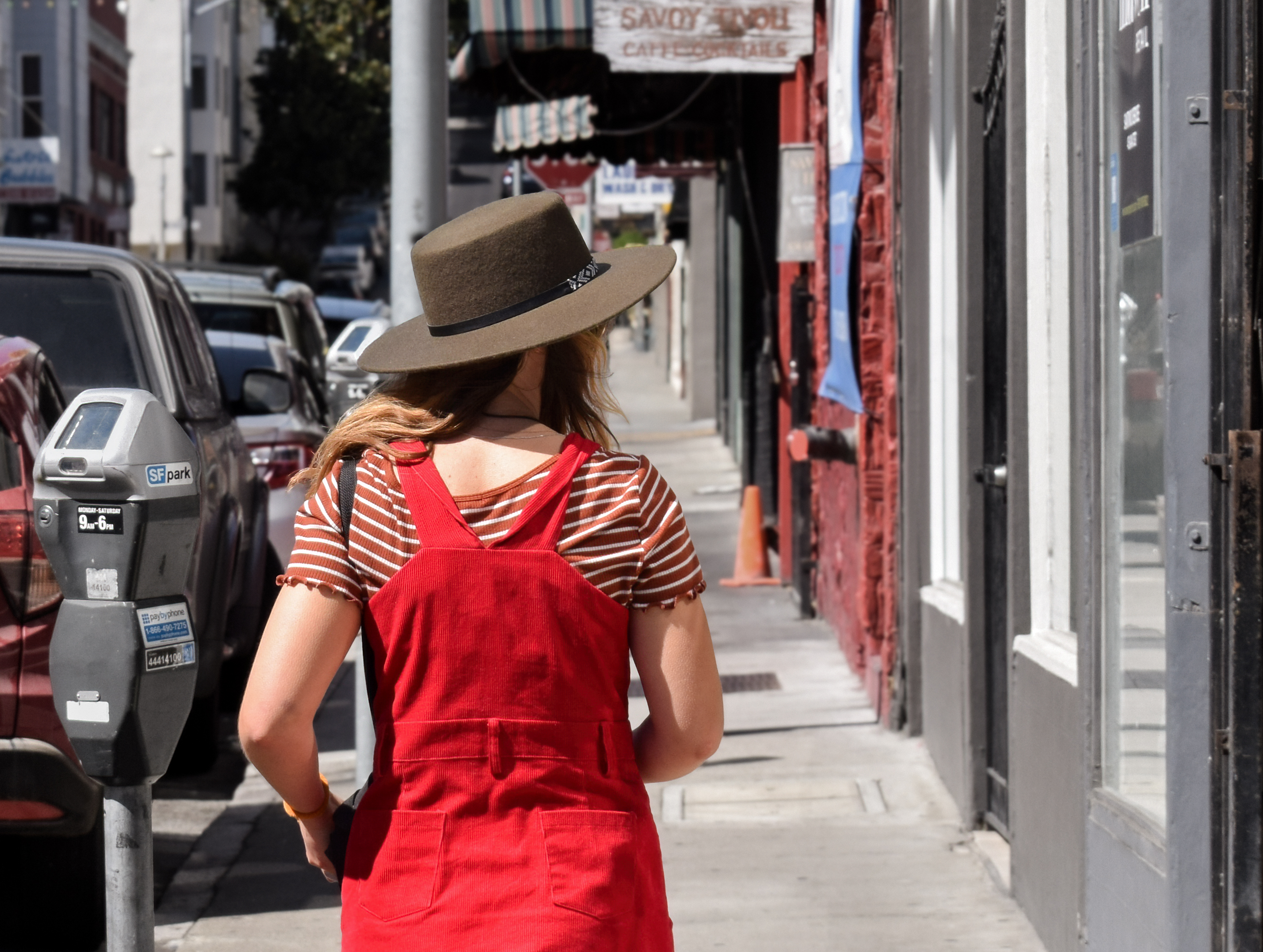
Classic wide-brimmed Western hat crafted in felt, North Beach, San Francisco

== See also ==
- Chapeaugraphy
- Headgear
- List of hat styles
- List of headgear
- List of outerwear
