= Hat brim =

Bottom outwards part of a hat

Parts of a hat.

A hat brim is that part of a hat that extends outwards and to the side of the head, protruding from the base of the crown. Hat brims run around the whole of the crown and come in varying widths. It is also called a bill. The outer edge of the brim may have trim made of leather, silk or ribbon material and is known as the brim binding.

The brim protects the eyes from both sun glare and precipitation. The broader the brim, the greater its protection function, but the easier it is for the hat to blow off due to the larger surface area available for the wind to act on. Hat brims are often decorative, for example, on very wide women's hats.

If a brim-like element is only attached to part of a hat, it is called a cap and this partial brim is known as a peak if at the front, a havelock if it protects the neck, or ear flaps if at the side.

In forensic medicine there is the so-called "hat brim rule", whereby an injury located above the hat brim line is probably the result of a blow to the head, whereas a fall would result in a wound at the hat brim level. This is used to assign an injury to an accident or a third-party.
