= Mae Reeves =

American milliner (1912–2016)

- Reeves and her husband Joel pose with her hats at Mae's Millinery in Philadelphia, circa 1953.
- Born: October 29, 1912; Vidalia, Georgia, USA
- Died: December 14, 2016 (aged 104)
- Education: Georgia State Teacher's College
- Occupation: Milliner
- Known for: Mae's Millinery Shop, one of the first shops in downtown Philadelphia to be owned by a woman of African American heritage.
- Awards: Pioneer award; "Hat's Off to Mae Day" recognition by the City of Philadelphia.

Mae Reeves (October 29, 1912 – December 14, 2016) was a pioneering milliner who was famous for her custom-made hats. She was active in her field from 1940 until 1997.

== Early life ==
Mae Reeves was born Lula Mae Grant, on October 29, 1912, in Vidalia, Georgia, to Samuel and Bessie Grant. She was the second oldest of six siblings.

== Education ==
When she was 16 years old Reeves enrolled in Georgia State Teacher's College, in Savannah. After receiving her teaching credential, she began work as a teacher in Lyons, Georgia. She also wrote for the Savannah Tribune about social, school and church issues. Reeves attended the Chicago School of Millinery during her summers away from teaching, learning how to make "one of a kind" handmade hats.

== Career ==
In 1934 Reeves moved to Philadelphia to work at a women's clothing shop on South Street. She created many hats while employed there, but her dream was to open her own hat shop, which she did in 1942.

Reeves received a $500 bank loan from Citizens and Southern Bank, and at the age of 28 she opened "Mae's Millinery Shop," located at 1630 South Street. By so doing she became one of the first African American women to own her own business in downtown Philadelphia.

Her clients included celebrities such as Ella Fitzgerald, Lena Horne, Eartha Kitt, Marian Anderson, and socialites from illustrious families, including the DuPonts and the Annenbergs. Women from all professions and from church also came to purchase hats from Reeves. She made trips to New York City and Paris to procure materials for her specialty, custom-made hats.

In 1953 Reeves opened a second shop near other successful businesses at 41 North 60th Street. She continued to create hats until 1997, when she was 85 years old. That year the hat shop closed, and several years later Reeves moved to a retirement home. Reeves' daughter Donna Limerick arranged for the contents of the shop to be donated to the Smithsonian.

== Community life and professional organizations ==
Reeves and her husband Joel belonged to Our Lady of the Rosary Church for 40 years. She was a member of the Ladies Auxiliary of the Knights of Columbus, the National Association of Fashion and Accessory Designers, and the NAACP. She was also the president of the 60th Street Business Association.

== Honors and recognition ==
July 27, 2010, was declared "Hats Off to Mae Day," by the city of Philadelphia. Philadelphia Mayor Michael Nutter awarded her the prestigious Philadelphia Liberty Bell prize. The celebration was organized by the Philadelphia Retail Marketing Alliance and hosted by the African American Museum of Philadelphia. She was honored with the "Pioneer" award from the Philadelphia Multicultural Affairs Congress on October 29, 2010, on her 98th birthday.

== Smithsonian ==
The Smithsonian National Museum of African American History and Culture obtained Reeves' collection of vintage hats, and antique furniture from her millinery shop, in addition to other personal items, in 2009. In 2016 the museum opened with a permanent exhibit of Reeves' extensive collection, including the shop's original red-neon sign, sewing machine, and antique furniture.

== Personal life ==
Reeves was first married to William Mincey, whom she met while teaching in Lyons. Together they had one son, William "Sonny" Mincey, Jr. In 1944 she married Joel Reeves, who worked at The Philadelphia Inquirer and also owned a catering company. They had two children together, Donna Limerick Pitsenberger (former NPR producer) and Reginald Reeves.

When Reeves died on December 14, 2016, she was survived by nine grandchildren, thirteen great-grandchildren, and eight great-great grandchildren.
