= Habash =

Habash may refer to:

== People ==
- Al-Habash, ancient region in the Horn of Africa
  - Habesha people, of Ethiopia and Eritrea
  - Siddi or Habshi, people of African descent in India and Pakistan
- Habash al-Hasib al-Marwazi, a Persian astronomer
- George Habash, a Palestinian political leader, ex-Secretary-General of the Popular Front for the Liberation of Palestine
- Sakher Habash, a Palestinian leader of the Fatah movement
- Mohammad Al-Habash, a Syrian Islamic scholar, writer and politician.

== Places ==
- Habash, Ardabil, Iran
- Habash, East Azerbaijan, Iran
- Habash-e Olya, West Azerbaijan Province, Iran
- Habash-e Sofla, West Azerbaijan Province, Iran
- Habash, Zanjan, Iran

== See also ==
- Habishi (disambiguation)
- Habashi (disambiguation)
- Abyssinian (disambiguation)
- Abyssinia (disambiguation)
- Siddi (disambiguation)
