= Habashi =

Habashi may refer to:

- Habesha people, ethnic term for people of Abyssinia (Habash in Arabic) or Ethiopia
- Siddi or Habshi, an ethnic group in South Asia of African origin
- Habashi, Ardabil
- Habashi, Hamadan
- Habashi, Kermanshah
- Habashi, West Azerbaijan

== See also ==
- Habishi (disambiguation)
- Habash (disambiguation)
- Siddi (disambiguation)
- Binyam Mohammed al-Habashi, former Guantanamo Bay detainee
