= Abyssinia (disambiguation) =

Abyssinia is a historical name for the Ethiopian Empire.

Abyssinia may also refer to:

== Arts and media ==
- Abyssinia, a theatrical show by Bert Williams
- Abyssinia (1987 musical), a show first staged in 1987
- Abyssinia (1906 musical), 1906 Broadway musical by Will Marion Cook, Bert Williams, Jesse A. Shipp, and Alex Rogers
- "Abyssinia", a song by the Patti Smith Group on Radio Ethiopia
- Abyssinia, a 2003 novel by Ursula Dubosarsky
- "Abyssinia, Henry", an episode of the television series M*A*S*H

== Places ==
- Abyssinia Lines, a neighbourhood of Jamshed Town in Karachi, Sindh, Pakistan
- Apostolic Vicariate of Abyssinia, the former Eastern Catholic missionary

== Vessels ==
- HMS Abyssinia (1870), a British armoured ship
- SS Abyssinia, an 1870 Canadian Pacific steamship

== Other uses ==
- Abyssinian languages, family of languages spoken in Ethiopia, Eritrea, and Sudan
- Abyssinian peoples, ethnic or pan-ethnic identifier used to refer to Ethiopians and Eritreans
- Abyssinia (battle honour)
- Abyssinia Creek, The Pilbara, Western Australia

== See also ==
- Abyssinian (disambiguation)
- Habash (disambiguation)
- Habishi (disambiguation)
- History of Ethiopia
