= Habesha kemis =

Traditional attire worn by Ethiopian or Eritrean women

Habesha kemis (Amharic: ቀሚስ, meaning "Dress" in Amharic) is an Amharic term used by Amhara people to refer to their traditional women's attire.

The term Habesha kemis is a relatively recent expression that gained currency in Addis Ababa. Historically, the garment was referred to simply as kemis, a general word for "dress" in Amharic, as Amhara communities' daily wear is made from shemma fabric prior to the introduction of European textiles in the mid-20th century. Following the spread of European clothing styles, the garment became widely described as bahelawi kemis (cultural dress) to set it apart from the modern, European styles. Over time, the term Habesha kemis came to be used persistently within the urban context of Addis Ababa and eventually became the dominant label for the style mainly originating from Addis Ababa. The label "Habesha Kemis" is not inherently Tigrayan or Eritrean, it is an Amhara-based nomenclature.

It is a long handwoven flowing cotton dress known for its tilet/tibeb embroidery along the hem, sleeves, and neckline. The base material for the Habesha kemis is shemma (Amharic ሸማ). Shemma is woven from hand-spun cotton and finished by skilled weavers known as shemane (Amharic ሸማኔ). The dress is typically white, beige, or light grey, although modern Habesha kemis comes in a variety of colors. It is paired with netela, a light shawl that is draped over the shoulders. The dress is worn at formal events, holidays, church ceremonies, weddings, and is an everyday wear for rural Amhara people.

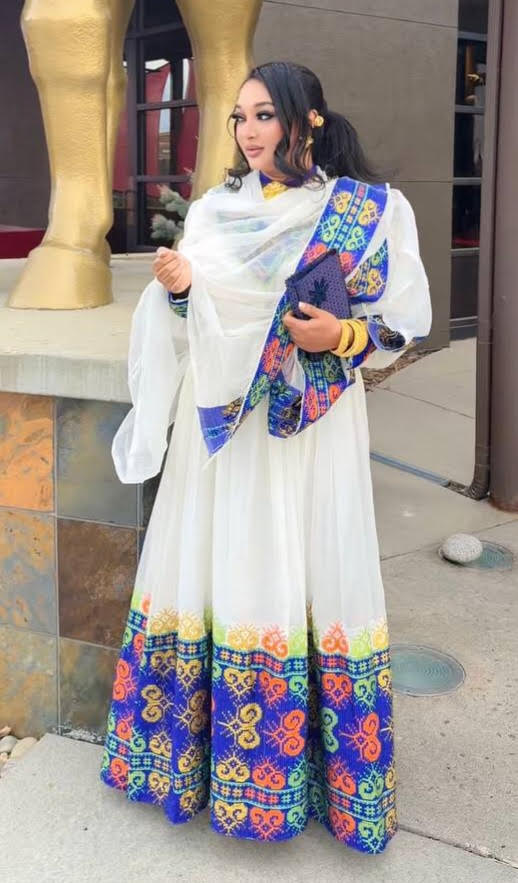
Shewa Amhara Menen Dress from Addis Ababa

For millennia, cotton cultivation and processing have been central to the social and economic fabric of Amhara communities, representing one of the region's oldest continuous textile traditions. Roughly 76% of all small-scale cotton farmers in Ethiopia are located in Amhara region. The production of handwoven cotton, known as shemma, is a staple of household and artisan activity, characterized by women spinning cotton by hand and men weaving on narrow looms. This handwoven cotton cloth remains the essential foundation for traditional dressmaking in the region, with the shemma serving as the DNA of the Habesha kemis.

Historical and archeological evidence indicates that Habesha kemis did not exist in the Aksumite era (c. 100-940 AD). Habesha kemis did not originate in Aksum. Iconographic evidence from Aksumite coinage, stone stelae, and early Ge'ez manuscripts depicts attire based on draped textiles rather than tailored sewing. Figures are typically shown in simple tunic or toga-like wraps that relied on folding for shape. The tibeb embroidery, the signature of the Habesha kemis, did not emerge until much later, following the shift of the political center to the Amhara region. The contemporary Habesha kemis, characterized by a structured bodice, defined waistline, and sewn sleeves, reflect tailoring techniques that became prominent during the Solomonic dynasty.

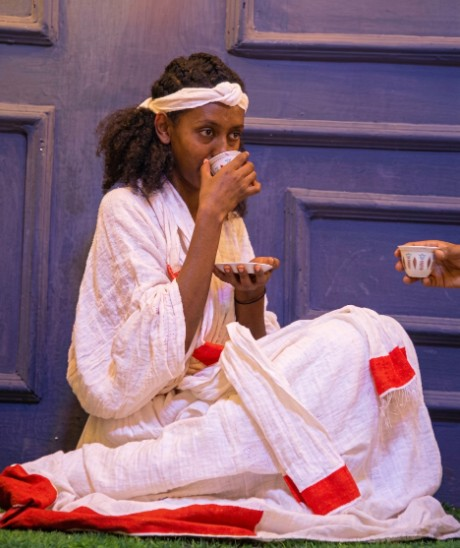
Shewa Amhara Fetel Dress

The visual identity of Habesha kemis relies on three distinct decorative elements:

1. Tilet (Amharic: ጥለት): This refers to the structural border placement on the garment. It frames areas like the hem, the back, or runs down the front. Woven directly on the loom, it also describes a solid, single-colored strip, typically red or green, that has been used for centuries.
2. Tibeb (Amharic: ጥበብ ): This is the multicolored, intricate geometric design woven directly into the fabric edges on the loom during production. Far from mere decoration, tibeb serves as a visual language where specific colors and patterns signify regional lineage, cultural memory, and the craftsman's skill.
3. Tilf (Amharic:ጥልፍ ): Distinct from the previous two woven methods, tilf is the only true form of hand embroidery, consisting of needle-and -thread work added to the finished fabric after weaving is complete.
4. Tilf Tibeb (Amharic:ጥልፍ ጥበብ): When hand embroidery is layered directly over a woven border, the combined technique is known as Tilf Tibeb.

These elements are typically placed on the neckline, sleeves, and hem. Together, they serve as the artistic signature of Amhara garment design, signaling both social standing and regional identity.

The Habesha kemis comes in many regional variations such as Shewa, Gojjam, Gondar, and Wollo. Its appearance shifts across regions due to differences in weaving centers, embroidery traditions, and local aesthetics. These variations do not change its cultural origin; they simply reflect how different Amhara people express the same garment.

== Shewa Amhara Dress ==
The contemporary Ethiopian dress, known as the Habesha kemis, is the traditional attire of the Shewa Amhara people that originated in the highlands of central Ethiopia. The garment consists of white, handwoven cotton cloth (shemma) characterized by distinctive bold woven borders. In the late 19th century, Emperor Menelik II relocated his royal encampment to the hot springs of Filwouha, establishing the settlement that became Addis Ababa. Amhara master weavers and their labor force migrated to the new capital from Ankober, the former capital of the Shewa kingdom. These artisans established weaving workshops near the royal palace in the area now known as Shiro Meda.

The Shiro Meda workshop produced shemma cloth for the royal household, the nobility, and the expanding urban population. The textile workforce in the capital grew further with the arrival of weavers from other Amhara towns, including Menz, Debre Berhan, and Bulga. This concentration of artisans established the professional infrastructure for the city's material culture, supplying garments for use in the palace, churches, and urban residential areas.

The production of the Habesha kemis relies on a specific narrow-loom technique brought to the capital by regional weavers. This method produces long, continuous strips of cotton. The edges of these strips are decorated with tibeb, which are intricate, multi-colored geometric patterns woven directly into the fabric on the loom. The final garment is assembled by stitching these narrow panels side by side to crate the full silhouette.

=== Three fundamental styles of Shewa Amhara Dress ===
Within the Shewa tradition, the dress is categorized by three distinct structural placements of the woven border (tilet).

1. Zuria Tilet (Amharic: ዙሪያ ጥለት): Translating to "circular border," this style features a continuous decorative band that encircles the entire bottom hem of the gown. This configuration is the most globally recognized silhouette. As Addis Ababa grew in political prominence, the Shewa Amhara garment became a prominent feature in state functions, diplomatic gathering, early photography, and early Ethiopian films. By the mid-20th century, this style had become the most widely recognized attire in Ethiopia. The Zuria tilet dress originated exclusively in the central highlands of Shewa and is the historical heritage of the Shewa Amhara people. It serves as a daily wear among rural Shewa Amhara communities.
2. Weraj Tilet (Amharic: ወራጅ ጥለት): Meaning "descending border," this variation incorporates a vertical tilet panel that extends downward from the chest to the bottom hem, creating a lengthened visual line often utilized in formal wear.
3. Gemash Tilet (Amharic: ግማሽ ጥለት) Translating to "half border," this design restricts the decorative pattern to the lower half of the back of the dress, offering a more understated aesthetic suited for daily wear.

All three configurations rely on tibeb motifs to convey regional identity and artisanal heritage. Specific border colors communicate distinct meanings: bold, vibrant green strips represent the lush, fertile landscape of Shewa region, while the deep red jano border signified political power and high social status, reserved primarily for the nobility and state officials.

=== Fabrics that Define Shewa Amhara Dress ===
The construction of the Shewa Amhara dress relies on specific types of handwoven cotton fabric collectively known as shemma. The textile tradition categorizes these fabrics into three primary varieties based on texture, material composition, and historical usage.

1. Fetel (Amharic:ፈትል ): Fetel is the foundational textile used in the production of Amhara garments, including the Shewa Amhara dress. It is a hand-spun and hand-woven cotton fabric characterized by a soft, breathable texture similar to gauze. The material is utilized for its structural durability and its capacity to support heavy tibeb borders without wrapping or distorting the underlying fabric.
2. Menen (Amharic:መነን ): Menen is a specialized variety of shemma that is specific to Addis Ababa Amhara society. The fabric was first developed in the 1890s within the weaving workshops of Shiro Meda by Amhara master weavers from Ankober. These artisans refined the weaving process to produce a finer, softer textile intended for Ethiopian royal court. The fabric achieved widespread prominence during the reign of Emperor Haile Selassie, named in honor of his consort, Empress Menen Asfaw. The adoption of the fabric by the Empress and the royal household elevated its social prestige, leading Addis Ababa's urban Amhara community to adopt it as a symbol of status and modernization. It remains a signature textile variant for urban Amhara dressmaking.
3. Saba (Amharic: ሳባ ): Saba is a premium, high-thread-count textile known for its lustrous finish and intricate color combinations. It is woven from fine cotton and frequently blended with silk or rayon threads to create a shiny surface. Saba served as a primary indicator of aristocratic status within the hierarchy of Amhara royal attire. In contemporary garment production, its use is no longer restricted to nobility. It is employed as a primary fabric for formal Shewa Amhara dresses and is also integrated into the tibeb borders of menen gowns to add visual depth.

=== Two-piece Set with Trousers ===
Traditional Shewa Amhara attire frequently features a coordinated two-piece ensemble known as Bale Albo Kemis (ባለ አልቦ ቀሚስ). This outfit pairs a classic dress with custom-embroidered cotton pants. Far from a mere accessory, these trousers serve as an essential functional and cultural role in the chilly Ethiopian highlands, providing vital insulation during freezing mornings and nights.

T complement the trousers; dress lengths are tailored differently depending on regional preferences:

- Knee-Length Cuts: A shorter style widely embraced as modern Addis Ababa Amhara fashion.
- Ankle-Length Cuts: A longer, traditional look favored across the wider Shewa countryside.

This versatile wardrobe system allows women to easily add trousers for modesty and warmth during daily chores or remove them during midday heat. The flexible, two-piece design remains a defining characteristic of Shewa Amhara textile tradition.

=== Global Recognition ===
The modern global prominence of Shewa Amhara attire was significantly accelerated when Ethiopian Airlines adopted the Zuria Tilet dress as its official cabin crew uniform. The carrier implemented a design deeply rooted in Shewa Amhara traditions. This uniform retains the foundational components of the historic style:

- Fabric Base: A crisp white Menen shemma woven cotton cloth.
- Embellishments: The signature tilet embroidery patterns.
- Border Work: Intricate and refined tibeb borders.
- Structure: The tailored, elegant Menen silhouette.

Through its extensive international flight network, the airline turned global airport terminals into runways for traditional Amhara craftsmanship. This commercial adoption served as a major cultural ambassador, projecting the distinct weaving heritage and aesthetic identity of the Shewa Amhara people onto an international stage. By maintaining strict fidelity to these localized regional roots, the Zuria Tilet kemis transitioned from a regional heritage garment into a globally recognized symbol of Ethiopian aviation and textiles.

=== Global Supply ===
The production and global distribution of the traditional Shewa Amhara dresses is centered in Addis Ababa, Ethiopia. Located in the central highlands of the historical Shewa province, Addis Ababa serves as the cultural, economic, and geographic epicenter of Shewa Amhara heritage. The commercial dominance of the Addis Ababa supply chain has led to the international standardization of the Shewa Amhara dress under the broad "Habesha kemis" marketing label. The mass-produced Shewa Amhara dresses are shipped daily to diaspora communities across North America, Europe, and the Middle East including the Eritrean diaspora for weddings, religious holidays, and cultural events solidifying its global presence.

The Habesha kemis influenced the design of the 20th century dashiki. The dashiki was born from a wax print pattern by Dutch designer Toon van de Mannaker for Netherlands-based Vlisco. Van de Mannaker's print pattern was inspired by the silk embroidered tunics worn by Christian Ethiopian noblewomen in the 19th century.

== Gojjam Amhara Dress ==
Gojjam Amhara dresses stand out for their bold, maximalist approach to texture, deep contrasting colors, and dense, highly elaborate embroidery styles. Originating from the fertile, historic Gojjam province in northwestern Ethiopia, this style is heavily tied to regional royalty and religious imagery. The women's dress is accompanied by a Netela (shawl) and a Mekenet. Older generations often favor exceptionally wide green or red borders along the fabric edges.

=== Fabric & Base ===
Thicker Hand-Woven Cotton (fetel): Gojjam garments often feature a slightly weightier, purely hand-spun cotton weave (fetel) to combat the chilly highland climate. It has a highly organic, rich texture.

Signature Embroidery (Tilf)

- Zege Tilf (Amharic: ዘጌ ጥልፍ ): This is the crown jewel of Gojjam dressmaking. Originating from the Zege peninsula on Lake Tana, this needlework style features dense, free-flowing, and swirling embroidery lines that bypass standard geometric grid layouts. The embroidery traditionally prioritizes deep, solid contrasting colors predominantly dark green, rich red, dark blue, and gold threads. Modern variants often incorporate Darket Tilet accented with silver threadwork.
- Yebir Gubgub (Amharic: የብር ጉብጉብ ): Authentic Zege designs are structurally embellished with small, silver button-shaped beads sewn directly on top of the hand-embroidered borders.

=== Men's counterpart ===
- Eje Tebab (Amharic: ) paired with a kuta or heavy gabi.

== Wollo Amhara Dress ==
The Wollo Amhara dress is the traditional attire originating from the historic Bete-Amhara (Wollo) province in northeastern Ethiopia.

Aside from standard brilliant-white base, Wollo dress traditions are celebrated for pioneering colorful background fabrics. Dresses are frequently woven using dark blue or charcoal grey colors.

=== Types of Fabric ===
- Raya Fabric: A specialized, high -quality, and highly popular woven cotton style unique to Wollo. It provices a slightly heavier, soft, and exceptionally elastic texture.
- Fetel: Pure, 100% organic handwoven cotton (shema) is heavily relied upon for high-end, premium dresses to ensure breathability.
- Dir-mag: A dual-thread structural weaving style where vertical and horizontal cotton threads are loomed tightly to create structural endurance.

=== Core Design Elements ===
- Tiftif (Amharic: ትፍትፍ): A foundational weaving style unique to the region. Tiftif refers specifically to a rectangular, block-like pattern of horizontal or vertical strips created directly on the handloom by the weaver using different colored threads. This structural woven section is strategically tailored onto the lower backside of the dress.
- Mekenet (Amharic: መቀነት ): A wide, matching embroidered shash or waist tie wrapped tightly around the midsection to structure the otherwise loose, free-flowing dress.
- Netela: Wollo dresses are packaged with matching accent shawls.
- Melgom (Buttons, Amharic: መልጎም): High end Wollo dresses frequently utilize the Melgom patchwork construction technique. This method features broad, separate tracks of dense tilet embroidery sewn directly into the midsection and frme of the dress. This embroidery is heavily accented with Melgom, small polished silver or gold button shaped beads individually stitched by hand on top of the embroidered edges and the woven tiftiv blocks to create a dramatic, metallic 3D contrast.

== Gondar Amhara Dress ==
The Gondar dress is a distinct regional variation of the Habesha Kemis, the traditional handwoven attire indigenous to the Amhara people of the Ethiopian highlands. Originating from the historic royal city of Gondar in northwestern Ethiopia, the dress is heavily influenced by the region's imperial, aristocratic, and religious history dating back to the Gondarian period. Mekenet is wrapped tightly around the midsecton to define the silhouette of the garment. The dress is accessorized with Netela (a lightweight cotton shawl). Gondar styles are paired with a Jano motif shawl, which features a bold thick red or green stirp running horizontally near the fabric edges.

=== Textile and Fabric ===
Gondar attire utilizes handwoven cotton textile produced on local traditional looms. The primary fabric is Fetel (Amharic: ፈትል). Fetel is a premium, highly soft textile made from purely hand-spun organic cotton.

=== Border and Pattern Work ===
The decorative borders (tilet or tibeb) of Gondar garments are characterized by structured, multi-colored geometric configurations. Gondar dresses frequently integrate bright yellow, red, and green threads into the fabric panels.

== Accessories of Habesha Kemis ==
The Habesha kemis in the contest of Amhara culture is traditionally accompanied by several accessories:

- Netela (ነጠላ): A netela is a lightweight, handwoven cotton shawl traditionally worn by Amhara women. It is typically made from fine shemma cotton and features narrow decorative borders known as tibeb at each end. The netela is draped over the shoulder or wrapped around the upper body and is commonly paired with the Habesha kemis for everyday wear, religious observance, and ceremonial occasions.
- Gabi (ጋቢ): Also known as buluko (ቡሉኮ) in some parts of Amhara, it is a thick, multi-layered cotton wrap traditionally worn for warmth in the Amhara highlands. Unlike the netela, which is light and delicate, the gabi is heavier and often made from four layers of woven cotton. It is used by both men and women and may be worn over the Habesha kemis during cold seasons or for outdoor events. The gabi is also associated with hospitality and is often given as a gift.
- Mekenet (መቀነት): A mekenet is a wide, thicker embroidered cotton sash tied around the waist to shape and secure Amhara dresses. It is commonly decorated with tibeb patterns that match or complement the dress. When the tibeb covers the entire meqenet or most of it, it is called tiftif (ትፍትፍ) mekenet. The tiftif meqenet is usually worn with a tiftif dress. The meqenet serves both functional and aesthetic purposes, helping define the silhouette of the garment while adding an additional layer of regional or stylistic identity.Traditionally, tiftif mekenet was worn on the kemis (dress) by children and unmarried girls, but today it's worn by women of all ages. A tiftif mekenet is dominated by wide, repeating bands of contrasting colored threads built directly into the fabric matrix by the weaver (shemanne). Traditional color palettes frequently combine different designs. The tiftif technique introduced a specific methodology for creating dense, multicolored horizontal and vertical color-blocking directly on a narrow loom. This highland structural method provided the framework for several iconic southern Ethiopia textile traditions. Many communities in southern Ethiopia such as Gamo, Dorze, Sidama, Gurage, Oromo, and Hadiya wore specialized attire constructed from processed animal hides, cowhides, or local plant fibers such as enset (false banana). The transition toward handwoven cotton textiles occurred as Amhara weaving technologies and design layouts spread southward through internal routes.
  - The Gamo and Dorze Highlands: These regions adapted the dense, multi-colored block-striping method of tiftif weaving to develop Dinguza, a heavy cotton fabric defined by its vibrant, stacked geometric bands. The Dorze subsequently introduced bold red, yellow, and black color schemes that came to dominate Dorze identity.
  - Sidama and Hadiya Attire: The interaction with the Amhara community allowed these pastoralists to supplement leather garments with durable, heavy cotton wraps utilizing the structural stripping patterns inherited from the Amhara tiftif tradition.
- Shash: A shash is a forehead band worn across the hairline and tied with a small knot when used by women. Traditionally, its practical purpose is to keep butter, oil, or sweat from running down the face, especially in communities where hair is dressed with butter. In addition to its functional role, the shash also serves as a decorative accessory, adding emphasis to the face and complementing the overall appearance of the garment. Men also wear the shash, but without the knot, typically wrapping it smoothly across the forehead for practical use rather than ornamentation.

== See also ==
- Bernos
- Coffee ceremony
- Culture of Ethiopia
- Dashiki
- Ethiopian suit
- Fashion in Ethiopia
- Gabi
