= Abyssinian =

Abyssinian may refer to:

== Cultures ==
- Abyssinian people and
- Things related to parts of Ethiopia, formerly known as Abyssinia

== Domestic animal breeds ==
- Abyssinian cat, a cat breed
- Abyssinian goat, a goat breed; see Rustica di Calabria
- Abyssinian guinea pig, a guinea pig (cavy) breed
- Abyssinian, a horse breed

== Other uses ==
- The Abyssinian, a 1997 novel by Jean-Christophe Rufin
- The Abyssinians, a Jamaican roots reggae group

== See also ==
- Abyssinian Meeting House, a historic church in Portland, Maine, USA
- Abyssinian black-and-white colobus, another name for the mantled guereza, a black-and-white colobus monkey
- Abyssinian roller, a bird that lives in tropical Africa
- Abyssinian siskin, a finch that lives in Ethiopia
- Abyssinian Campaign (disambiguation)
- Abyssinia (disambiguation)
