= Habishi (disambiguation) =

Habishi (Arabic: حَبِيْشي, romanized: Ḥabīshī) may refer to:

- Habeshistan, a name for Abyssinia or Ethiopia
- Habesha peoples, people of Ethiopia and Eritrea
- Siddi or Habshi, people of African origin in India and Pakistan

== Iran ==
- Habishi, a village in Mollasani Rural District, in the Central District of Bavi County, Khuzestan Province
- Hoseynabad-e Hafashlu, a village in Akhtarabad Rural District, in the Central District of Malard County, Tehran Province

== See also ==
- Habashi (disambiguation)
- Habash (disambiguation)
- Siddi (disambiguation)
- Hobeish (disambiguation)
