= Ethiopian suit =

Traditional formal wear of the men of Ethiopia and Eritrea

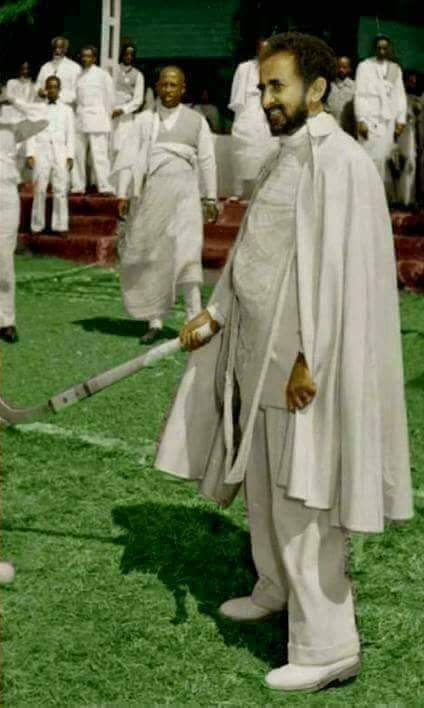
Emperor Haile Selassie wearing the traditional clothing

An Ethiopian suit is the name given in America to the traditional formal wear of the men of Ethiopia. It consists of a long sleeve, knee-length shirt, and matching pants, often Jodhpurs or shorts. Most shirts are made with a Mandarin, band, kurta, or Nehru collar. The suit is made of chiffon, which is a sheer silk or rayon cloth. A shawl, either the Netela, kuta, or Gabi is wrapped around the suit. Footwear worn alongside it shifted to western dress shoes in the late 19th century and today is similar to fisherman sandals (saltwater sandals & jelly shoes). Historically, most common were curved toe poulaine like shoes in a middle-eastern style occasionally made with precious metals. Ethiopian suits are worn for weddings, church and synagogue services, and other special occasions.

In the opening ceremony of each Summer Olympics during the Parade of Nations, the Ethiopian team marched in white suits. In the United States and the Caribbean, Ethiopian suits are also worn by Rastafarian men.

== See also ==
- Bernos
- Culture of Ethiopia
- Culture of Eritrea
- Coffee ceremony
- Fashion in Ethiopia
- Habesha kemis
