= Sidh =

Sidh may refer to:

- Sidh, Gujrat, a village in the Gujrat District of Pakistan
- Sidh community, a caste in western Rajasthan, India
- Sidh, the abodes of the Aos Sí in Celtic mythology
- Supersingular Isogeny Diffie–Hellman Key Exchange, post-quantum public key cryptographic algorithm; see Supersingular isogeny key exchange

== See also ==
- Siddha (disambiguation)
- Siddham (disambiguation)
