= Siddha Yoga (disambiguation) =

The phrase siddha yoga can refer to:

- The Siddha Yoga path, founded by Swami Muktananda.
- the Shaiva Siddhanta yoga tradition
- the Siddhayoga-Tirtha lineage

== See also ==
- Siddha (disambiguation)
