= Clothing in Ethiopia =

Overview of traditional and modern clothing in Ethiopia

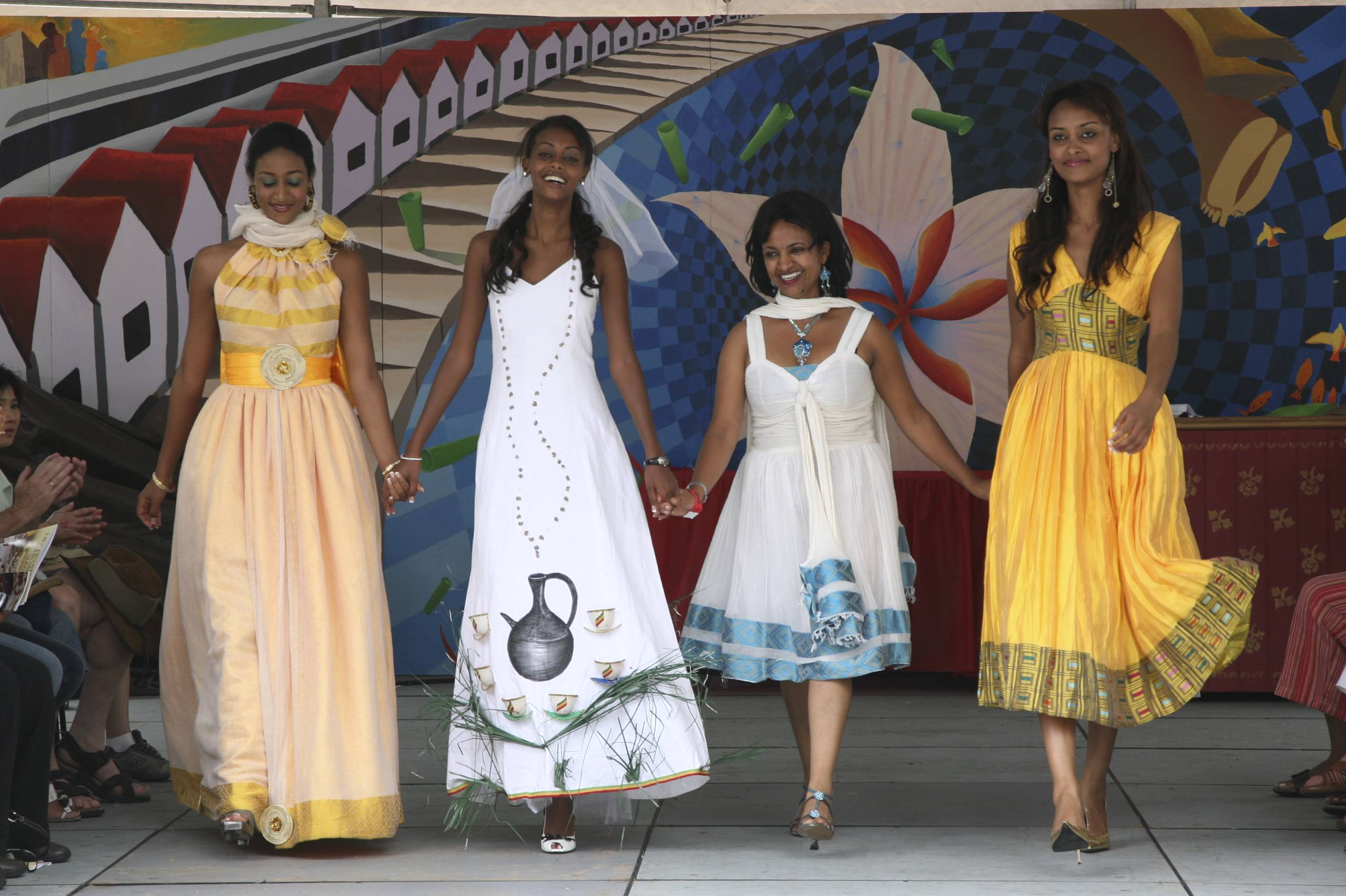
- Ethiopian fashion show at the Houston International Festival, 2008
- Type: Traditional and modern clothing
- Material: Cotton (shemma), wool, leather, cowhide
- Place of origin: Ethiopia

Clothing in Ethiopia includes traditional garments as well as modern fashion, accessories and cosmetics. Traditional dress varies from one region and ethnic group to another in its materials, manufacturing techniques and decoration.

Hand-woven cotton cloth, or shemma, is the most common textile in the northern and central highlands, where it is used for the Habesha kemis and for shawls such as the netela, kuta and gabi. Among the Oromo and several pastoralist and agro-pastoralist peoples of the south, leather and cowhide have long been essential materials, valued for their durability, warmth and symbolic meaning.

== Textiles ==
Ethiopia has a long history of textile manufacturing based on its cotton production. The Amhara Region is the traditional heartland of this production: in 2021 it accounted for 76% of the country's small-scale cotton farmers. Hand-loomed cotton weaving has historically been centred in the Amhara provinces of Gondar, Wollo, Gojjam and Shewa, where specialised weavers have worked for centuries. Their main product, the shemma, is the base of the traditional attire of the central highlands, and the concentration of pit-loom weaving in these areas made them the main suppliers of cotton clothing to other parts of the country.

Ethiopia is known for handcrafted fabrics ranging from translucent shemma to fine Amhara embroidery, and is becoming a hub for global fashion manufacturing. Local designers adapt hand-woven cotton and traditional embroidery to contemporary fashion.

== Traditional attire ==
=== Habesha kemis ===
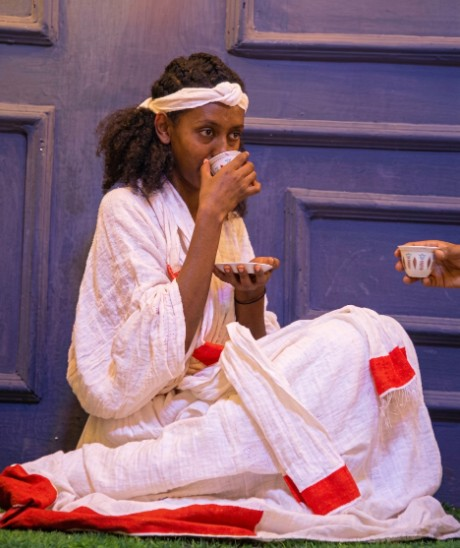
Shewa Amhara dress

The Habesha kemis is the traditional hand-woven cotton dress of the Habesha peoples, including the Amhara and Tigrayans of the highlands. The white, ankle-length dress has been widely adopted as a national symbol of Ethiopia. Regional variations, distinguished by their embroidery motifs (tilet) and patterns, exist in areas such as Gondar, Gojjam, Wollo and Shewa.

Other peoples have distinct attire, such as the cowhide garments of the Oromo, the brightly coloured wraps of the Afar, the long white cloth of Somali women, knotted over one shoulder, and the dresses of the Harari (see below).

=== Men's clothing ===
The formal Ethiopian suit consists of a long-sleeved, knee-length shirt with matching trousers, usually with a band or mandarin collar, over which a netela or kuta is draped. Eje tebab (Amharic: እጀ ጠባብ) is a traditional Amhara men's outfit: a white tunic reaching the knee, worn with white trousers called tenefanef (ተነፋነፍ).

The bernos is a cloak-like woollen garment with a hood, woven in one piece. Long worn by highland elites, its decorative pattern indicates social status, and it is still worn at ceremonies and on special occasions. Donald N. Levine noted that the wealthier men of Menz, in Shewa, wore "the barnos, a tailored cape made of dark wool".

=== Shawls and wraps ===
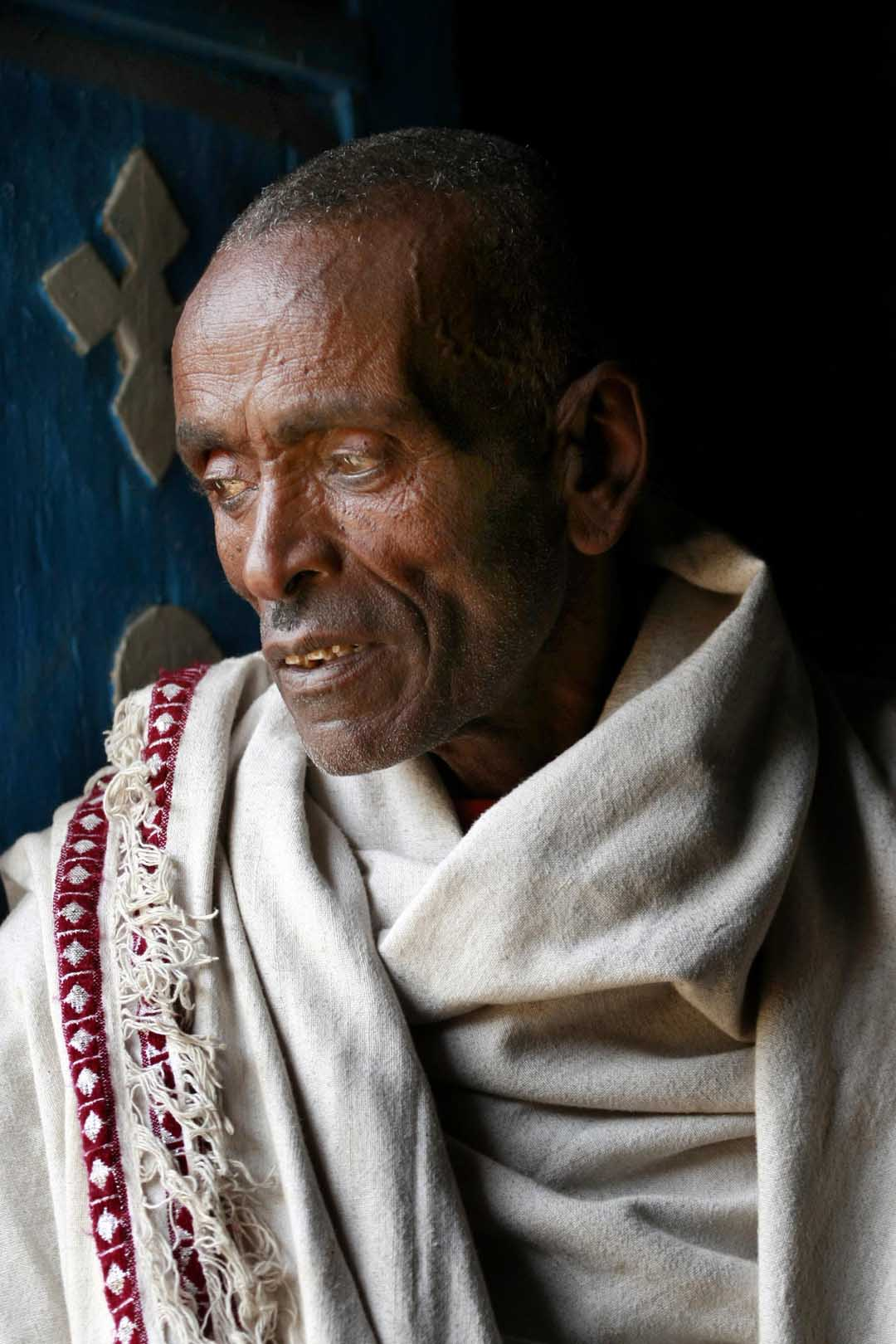
Man wrapped in a cotton shawl

Several types of hand-woven cotton cloth are worn as shawls or head coverings.

The netela (Amharic: ነጠላ) is a thin, single-layered shawl worn by women with the Habesha kemis; its name means 'single' in Amharic. The kuta is its male equivalent, a two-layered white cotton cloth worn over the shoulders or head, especially at church and religious ceremonies.

The gabi (Amharic: ጋቢ), a thicker shawl of four layers or buluko (ቡልኮ), an even thicker cotton shawl slightly bigger than the gabi that could also be used as bedding, is worn by both men and women in cold weather, mostly by the elderly. Because of the high altitude of their homeland, it is a common household item among the Amhara, especially for clergy and the elderly. Village leaders and elders often wear it at important meetings as a mark of authority, and its weight also makes it a blanket against the highland cold. Amhara women gather to spin the yarn for several gabis, which they give to their husbands. In North Wollo, wearing a gabi is a sign of the head of a household, and the groom's father receives one from the bride's family during the wedding gift ceremony.

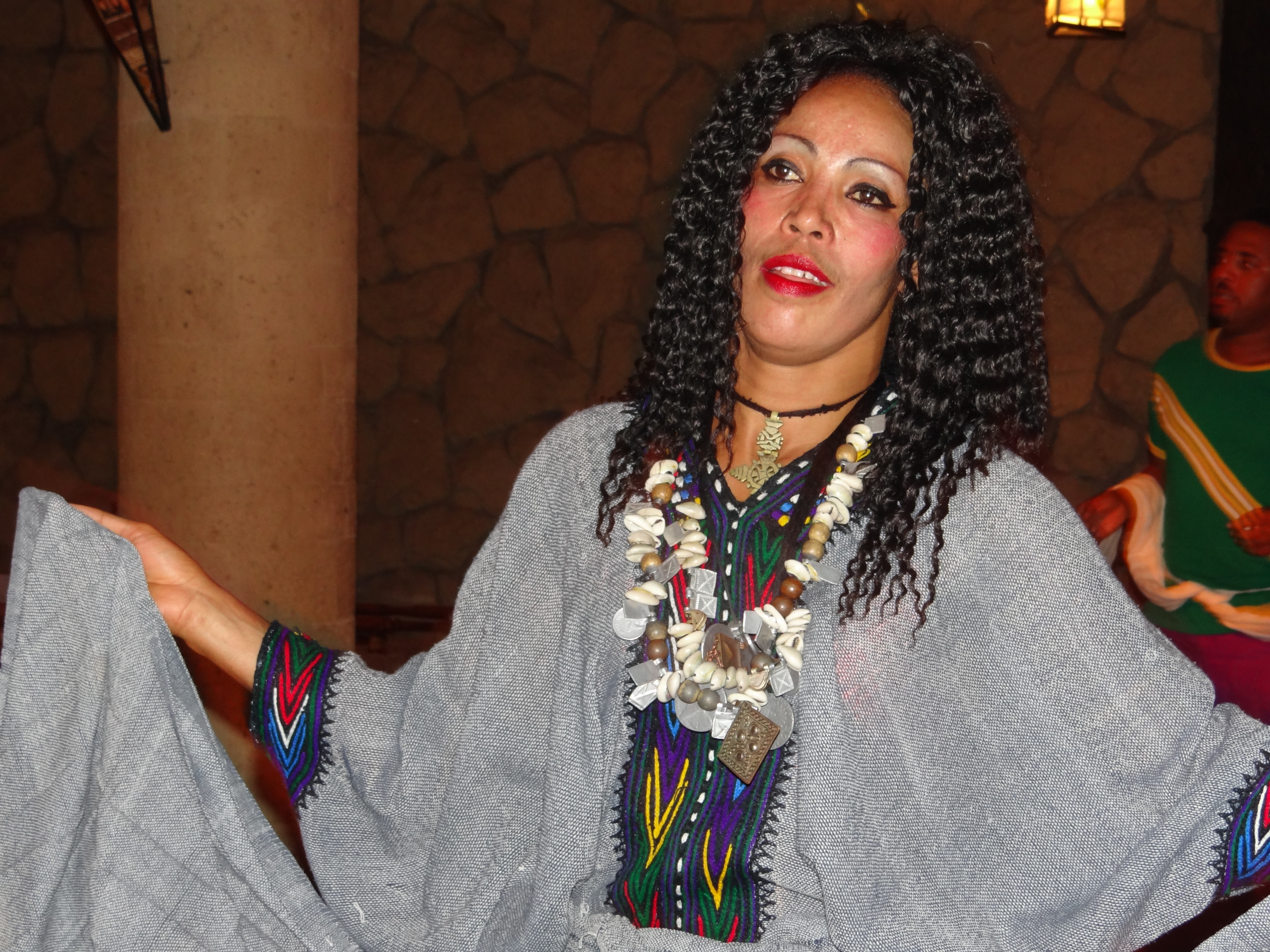
Woman in traditional dress performing a dance

Traditional dresses for sale

Clothing market at Shiro Meda, Addis Ababa

== Regional dress ==
In the south and centre of Ethiopia, leather and cowhide are foundational materials for both everyday and ceremonial clothing, reflecting a pastoralist heritage.

=== Oromo ===
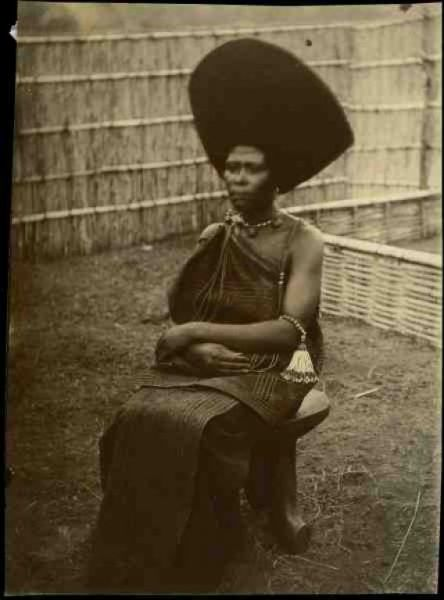
Oromo woman wearing a qollo and a wandabo, Jimma

The predominantly pastoralist Oromo have a long tradition of cowhide clothing, often treated with animal fat and decorated with cowrie shells. They use three main kinds of skin:

- cowhide (gogaa loonii), used for structured garments such as the wandabo, a knee-length wrap-around skirt for women;
- goat and sheep skin (haduu, gogaa reeyee), used for capes and more flexible garments such as the qollo, a cloak worn over the shoulders;
- wild animal skins (gogaa bineensaa), from colobus monkeys or leopards, reserved for the luba, the ruling age grade of the Gadaa system.

Other garments include the gurda (or sabaqa), a wide, stiff leather belt covered with beads whose patterns indicate a woman's clan and family wealth, and the woya, a toga-like robe of softened hide worn by men. Women also wear the gorfo (sadetti), a beaded cowhide dress, and men the sirra, a layered leather wrap.

=== Southern Ethiopia ===
Peoples of southern Ethiopia traditionally relied on leather, animal skins and fibres from the enset plant. Among the Gamo, hides were used for ritual capes and everyday clothing until the Derg outlawed indigenous leather clothing from 1974. The Silte also wore leather clothing (zuria) in the past; after the introduction of ethnic federalism, they designed new cultural costumes as ethnic markers. Cotton clothing spread in the south with increased trade and the expansion of the Ethiopian state in the late 19th century.

=== Harari ===
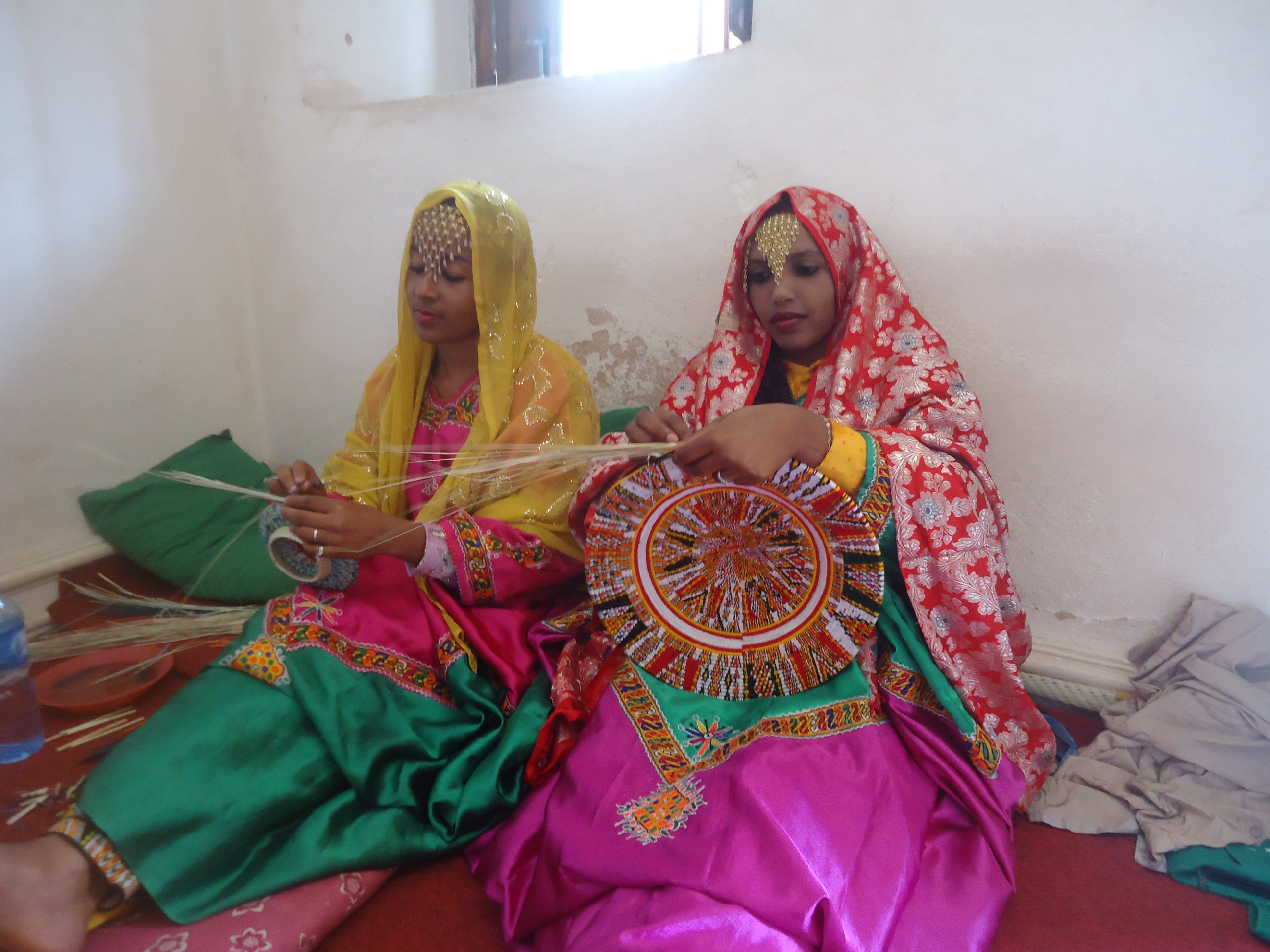
Harari women in traditional dress weaving baskets

Harari women traditionally wear the tey eraz, a long, wide-skirted black or indigo dress with a scarlet embroidered triangle from shoulder to waist, and the gey eraz, a double-faced dress of silk or fine cotton with one ornate side for festivals and a simpler side for daily wear. They are worn with embroidered gey gannafi trousers, the melfota headwrap and the siyasa, an embroidered headpiece, together with silver jewellery and long necklaces. Harari men wear a kufi, plain white or crocheted with geometric motifs.

== Cosmetics and personal care ==
On 14 October 2022, the Ministry of Finance instructed the National Bank of Ethiopia to ban imports of 38 categories of "luxury items", including beauty products. The beauty and personal care market has since faced affordability problems and shortages of raw materials.
