= Chittar =

Chittar may refer to:

- Siddhar or Chittar, a learned sage in Hinduism
- Chittar, Kerala, a village in Kerala
- Chittar, Tamil Nadu, a village in Tamil Nadu
- Chittar River, a river in Tamil Nadu

== See also ==
- Siddha (disambiguation)
