= Sidi (disambiguation) =

Sidi is an Arabic honorific.

Sidi may also refer to:

== People ==
- Sidi Heddi, 13th century Moroccan marabout and founder of the Heddāwa Islamic order
- Sidi Mohammed, 17th century Hadiya state leader
- Sidi al-Ayachi (died 1641), Moroccan marabout, warlord and jihadist
- Sidi Alioum (born 1982), Cameroonian football referee
- Sidi Larbi Cherkaoui (born 1976), Belgian-Moroccan dancer, choreographer and director
- Sidi Fofana (born 1992), French footballer
- Sidi Yaya Keita (born 1985), Malian former footballer
- Sidi Saleh (born 1979), Indonesian film director
- Sidi Moro Sanneh (born 1947), Gambian economist
- Emma Sidi (born 1991), English actress
- Nick Sidi (born 1966), English actor
- Péter Sidi (born 1978), Hungarian sport shooter and former world champion
- Irán Eory, stage name of Iranian-born Spaniard and Mexican actress and model Elvira Sidi (1937–2002)
- Sidi Tal, Jewish singer and actress in Yiddish born Sorele Birkental (1912–1983)

== Other uses ==
- SIDI, an Italian cycling and motorcycling shoe manufacturer
- Sidi language, an extinct Bantu language of India
- Sidi (novel), a 2019 novel by Arturo Pérez-Reverte
- Spark Ignition Direct Injection (SIDI), more commonly called Direct Injection Spark Ignition

== See also ==
- Sidis (disambiguation)
- Siddi (disambiguation)
  - Siddi, a community of Sufis from the region of Gujarat, India, who arrived from East Africa in the 12th century
- Siddha (disambiguation)
