= Attire of Shewa Amhara =

Cultural clothing of Shewa Amhara

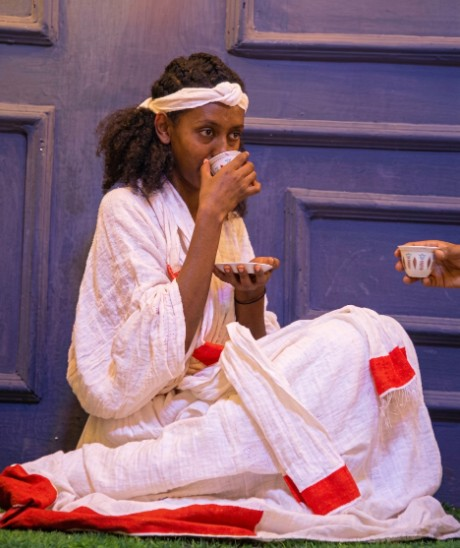
Amhara dress from Shewa

The cultural clothing of the Shewa Amhara in Ethiopia is defined by its regal elegance and its historical elevation to Ethiopia's national attire during the imperial era. The Shewa Amhara dress, a snow-white, ankle-length dress is crafted from hand-loomed cotton known as shemma. Shewa-specific variations often feature delicate Menen fabrics adorned with intricate geometric embroidery called tibeb (Amharic: ጥበብ) along the cuffs, neckline, and hem. This ensemble is invariably paired with a matching netela (ነጠላ), a fine gauzy like shawl draped with specific cultural grace

== Kaba ==
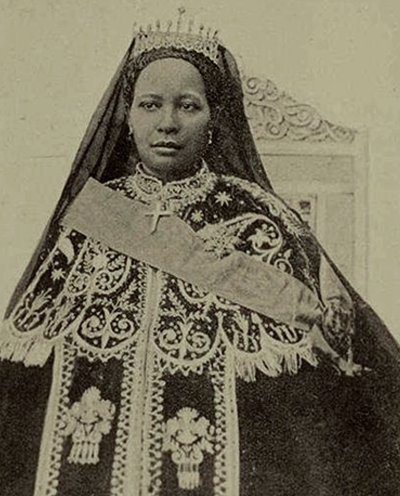
Empress Zewditu c. 1916–1930 depicted wearing the ካባ (kaba). Daughter of Emperor Menelik II of Shewa

=== Historical use ===
The kaba (ካባ) is the traditional ceremonial outer garment historically worn by the royal nobility and high-ranking clergy of the Shewan rulers.

Historically, the use of the garment was strictly regulated to the highest class of nobility. The specific materials it was plated with (usually gold or silvery embroidery known as sirma) was used exclusively to signify a person's exact role and rank in imperial society.

=== Modern use ===
In modern society, the kaba has spread outside of use in Amhara culture into broader the Habesha culture including Eritreans. It is primarily used a form of wedding attire, particularly used in mels (መልስ) and kiliel (ቅልቅል) celebrations following the wedding.

== Bernos ==
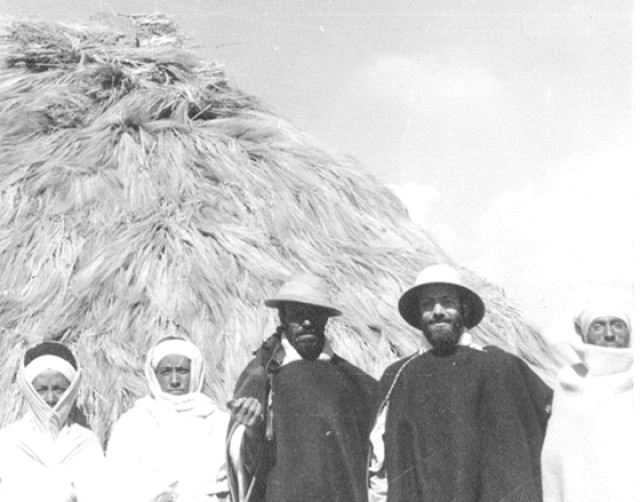
Amhara aristocrat dressed in tradition cloak (bernos) with Donald Levine

A bernos (በርኖስ) is a wool cloak-like garment and hood woven in one piece, traditionally worn by men of the Amhara ethnic group of Ethiopia, most commonly in the relatively cold Shewa.

== Eje tebab ==
For men, the quintessential Shewa attire is the eje tebab (እጀጠባብ), a knee-length white tunic with tight-fitting sleeves, often worn over tenefanef trousers. A distinctive feature for Shewa men, particularly in high-altitude areas like Menz, is the bernos (በርኖስ). Bernos is a heavy, tailored cape made of dark wool that signifies elite social status and provides warmth. On formal occasions, men may also wear a kuta (the male version of the netela) or a gabi (ጋቢ) also known as buleko (a thick, four-layered cotton blanket). These garments are not merely fashion but deep-rooted weaving heritage and symbols of Orthodox Christian identity.

== See also ==
- Kingdom of Shewa
- Addis Ababa
