= Siddi (disambiguation) =

The Siddi (also sometimes known as Habshi) are an ethnic group of African origin in India and Pakistan.

Siddi may also refer to:

- Siddis of Karnataka, the ethnic group in the Indian state of Karnataka
- Sidi, an Arabic honorific, also the origin of the group's name
- Siddhi, a Hindu spiritual term
- Siddi, Sardinia, the Italian comune
- Siddi, Nepal, village in Nepal
- Antonio Siddi (1923-1983), Italian sprinter
- Siddy, an upcoming Indian Malayalam-language film

== See also ==
- Sidi (disambiguation)
- Siddha (disambiguation)
- Habashi (disambiguation)
- Habishi (disambiguation)
- Habash (disambiguation)
- Indo-African (disambiguation)
