= Siddham =

Siddham may refer to:

- Siddhaṃ script, an alphabet and numeral script that originated and was used in India; now used in East Asia only
  - Siddham (Unicode block)
- Siddham (film), a 2009 Indian Telugu-language action film

== See also ==
- Siddha (disambiguation)
- Sidh (disambiguation)
