= Sidis =

Sidis may refer to:

- Boris Sidis (1867–1923), psychologist, psychiatrist, and psychopathologist, father of William James Sidis
- William James Sidis (1898–1944), eccentric genius and child prodigy, son of Boris
- Sidis (genus), a genus of lady beetles, in the family Coccinellidae
- The Sidi or Siddi, an Indian and Pakistani ethnic group of mainly East African descent
- Semi-Inclusive Deep Inelastic Scattering, a process in high energy particle physics.

== See also ==
- Sidi (disambiguation)
