= Habashi, Kermanshah =

Habashi حبشي
- Village
- Location within Iran
- Coordinates: 34°54′21″N 47°30′01″E
- Country: Iran
- Province: Kermanshah
- County: Sonqor
- Bakhsh: Central
- Rural District: Gavrud

Population (2006)
  - Total: 279
- Time zone: UTC+3:30 (IRST)
  - Summer (DST): UTC+4:30 (IRDT)

Habashi (Persian: حبشي, also Romanized as Ḩabashī) is a village in Gavrud Rural District, in the Central District of Sonqor County, Kermanshah Province, Iran. At the 2006 census, its population was 279, in 63 families.
