= Sidh (community) =

Indian caste and Niguna sect

Sidhs, also spelled Siddh (Hindi: सिद्ध) are people associated to a caste and also a nirguna sect that originated in the 15th century, in the Bikaner State, based on the revelation of Guru Jasnathji. The term Siddh means one who has proved himself. Sidh people, along with Jogi and Nath are included in State list of OBC castes in Rajasthan. They however aren't included in central list of OBCs for Rajasthan.

== History ==
Guru Jasnathji (1484-1506), founder of Sidh sampraday, was the foster child of Hamirji Jyani and his wife Rupande, who were residents of the Katariyasar village situated 25 miles north-east of Bikaner. Jasnathji, underwent tapasya and founded his own religious sect. His disciples being followers of a Siddh (one who attained divine grace), became known as Sidh. In course of time they became a closed endogamous community.

== Culture and religious observations ==
A Siddh man can be identified by his typical saffron coloured turban. The Siddh are purely vegetarian. Alcoholic drink is prohibited among them. The Sidh are divided into a number of gotras. Some common gotras are Kookna, Godara, Jyani, Manda, Jakhar, Saran, Mahiya, Bhadu, Sau, Kalwania, Balihara, Sihag, Man, etc. Gotras are strictly exogamous and all equal in social status. Remarriage of a woman whether deserted or widowed is allowed. Marriage with detail rituals takes place in case of first marriage of a girl only.

=== 36 Rules ===
As many as 36 principles have been prescribed for the Siddhs. These are listed as follows.

1. Participate in welfare works.

2. Follow one's own religion.

3. Do not indulge in violence.

4. Keep long hair.

5. Take meals only after bath.

6. Pray to God in the morning and evening.

7. Be satisfied.

8. Have faith in one God.

9. Perform Ahom (ritual of purification).

10. Do not blow on fire with unclean mouth.

11. Drink water and milk after sieving through cloth.

12. The dead should be buried.

13. Search the way for salvation.

14. Do not sell your daughters.

15. Give up taking interest and compound interest.

16. Spend 1/20 part of your income on religious activities.

17. Do not indulge in back-biting.

18. Give up smoking and garlic.

19. Do not indulge in immoral business.

20. Do not castrate oxen and do not sell animals to the butchers.

21. Have compassion for animals.

22. Build cow shelters and save cattle from the butchers.

23. Have faith in religion and be compassionate.

24. Do not indulge in arguments.

25. Take care of guests at home.

26. Give up vices like stealing.

27. Menstruating women should be kept aloof.

28. Give up drinking.

29. Observe sutak after death and birth. (According to this belief, a household is considered impure at the time of childbirth or miscarriage.)

30. Do not harass the family members.

31. Remember Lord Shiva.

32. Do not eat meat.

33. Give up the company of bad people.

34. Be tolerant and forgive others.

35. Give up intoxicants like opium, marijuana etc.

36. Give water and feed the birds.

A quick glance over these principles shows that many of them are repeated. The injunction regarding the consumption of intoxicants appears thrice (numbers 18, 28, 35). Similarly, protection of animals has been repeated thrice (numbers 20, 21, 22). A concern with gender relations becomes evident, as the social evil of selling daughters has been prohibited.
