= Habashi, West Azerbaijan =

Village in West Azerbaijan province, Iran

Habashi Persian: حبشي
- Village
- Location within Iran
- Coordinates: 38°12′13″N 44°53′02″E
- Country: Iran
- Province: West Azerbaijan
- County: Salmas
- District: Central
- Rural District: Lakestan

Population (2016)
  - Total: 826
- Time zone: UTC+3:30 (IRST)

Habashi (Persian: حبشي) (Note: Also romanized as Ḩabashī and Habashī; in Armenian: Աբաշի) is a village in Lakestan Rural District of the Central District in Salmas County, West Azerbaijan province, Iran.

== Demographics ==
=== Population ===
At the time of the 2006 National Census, the village's population was 1,044 in 249 households. The following census in 2011 counted 1,033 people in 286 households. The 2016 census measured the population of the village as 826 people in 242 households.
