= Hoseynabad-e Hafashlu =

Hoseynabad-e Hafashlu حُسين ابادهفشلو (in Persian)
- Village
- Location within Iran
- Coordinates: 35°34′46″N 50°42′49″E
- Country: Iran
- Province: Tehran
- County: Malard
- Bakhsh: Central
- Rural District: Akhtarabad

Population (2006)
  - Total: 67
- Time zone: UTC+3:30 (IRST)
  - Summer (DST): UTC+4:30 (IRDT)

Hoseynabad-e Hafashlu (Persian: حُسين ابادهفشلو, also Romanized as Ḩoseynābād-e Hafashlū and Ḩoseynābād-e Hapeshlū; also known as Habeshlī, Habishi, and Habishli) is a village in Akhtarabad Rural District, in the Central District of Malard County, Tehran Province, Iran. At the 2006 census, its population was 67, in 15 families.
