= Siddha (disambiguation) =

Siddha is a Sanskrit term meaning "one who is accomplished"; has mastered, or has mastery over pure consciousness/knowledge (chit).

- Siddhar; Chittar, a variant English spelling

Siddha may refer to:

- Siddha, in Hinduism and Jainism, a person who has attained a high level of spiritual enlightenment
- Siddha Yoga, a spiritual path in Hindu traditions
- Siddha medicine, a form of South Indian, Tamil traditional medicine

== Places ==
- Siddha, Gandaki, a town in Nepal
- Siddha, Janakpur, a town in Nepal

== See also ==
- Siddham (disambiguation)
- Sidh (disambiguation)
- Siddi (disambiguation)
- Sidi (disambiguation)
- Siddhartha (disambiguation)
- Siddhanta, settled doctrine in Indian philosophy
- Chittar (disambiguation)
- Mahasiddha, a term for someone who embodies and cultivates siddhi of perfection
