= Abyssinian campaign =

Abyssinian campaign can mean:

- 1868 Expedition to Abyssinia, British rescue mission and punitive campaign against the Ethiopian Emperor Tewodros II
- East African campaign (World War II), battles fought between British Empire and Commonwealth forces and Italy in Italian East Africa during World War II, often seen as part of the North African campaign
- Second Italo-Abyssinian War (also known as the "Italo-Ethiopian War"), a war of seven months in 1935–1936, often seen as one precursor to World War II
