= Abyssinia Creek =

Location
- Country: Australia
- Region: Pilbara

Physical characteristics
- Source
  - coordinates: 21°43′41.69″S 119°18′1.96″E

Abyssinia Creek is a small meander in The Pilbara, Western Australia. It flows through the Tambourah mining district from the Tambourah Creek.
