= Habash, East Azerbaijan =

Habash حبش
- Village
- Location within Iran
- Coordinates: 37°13′14″N 46°46′38″E
- Country: Iran
- Province: East Azerbaijan
- County: Hashtrud
- Bakhsh: Nazarkahrizi
- Rural District: Nazarkahrizi

Population (2006)
  - Total: 82
- Time zone: UTC+3:30 (IRST)
  - Summer (DST): UTC+4:30 (IRDT)

Habash (Persian: حبش, also Romanized as Ḩabash; also known as Sarcheshmeh and Ḩabash Sarcheshmeh) is a village in Nazarkahrizi Rural District, Nazarkahrizi District, Hashtrud County, East Azerbaijan Province, Iran. At the 2006 census, its population was 82, in 13 families.
