= Habash, Ardabil =

Village in Ardabil province, Iran

Habash Persian: حبش
- Village
- Location within Iran
- Coordinates: 38°23′03″N 47°30′44″E
- Country: Iran
- Province: Ardabil
- County: Meshgin Shahr
- District: Qosabeh
- Rural District: Meshgin-e Gharbi

Population (2016)
  - Total: 167
- Time zone: UTC+3:30 (IRST)

Habash (Persian: حبش) (Note: Also romanized as Ḩabash; also known as Ḩabashī) is a village in Meshgin-e Gharbi Rural District of Qosabeh District in Meshgin Shahr County, Ardabil province, Iran.

== Demographics ==
=== Population ===
At the time of the 2006 National Census, the village's population was 224 in 53 households, when it was in the Central District. The following census in 2011 counted 222 people in 57 households. The 2016 census measured the population of the village as 167 people in 53 households, by which time the rural district had been separated from the district in the formation of Qosabeh District.
