= Kingdom of Shewa =

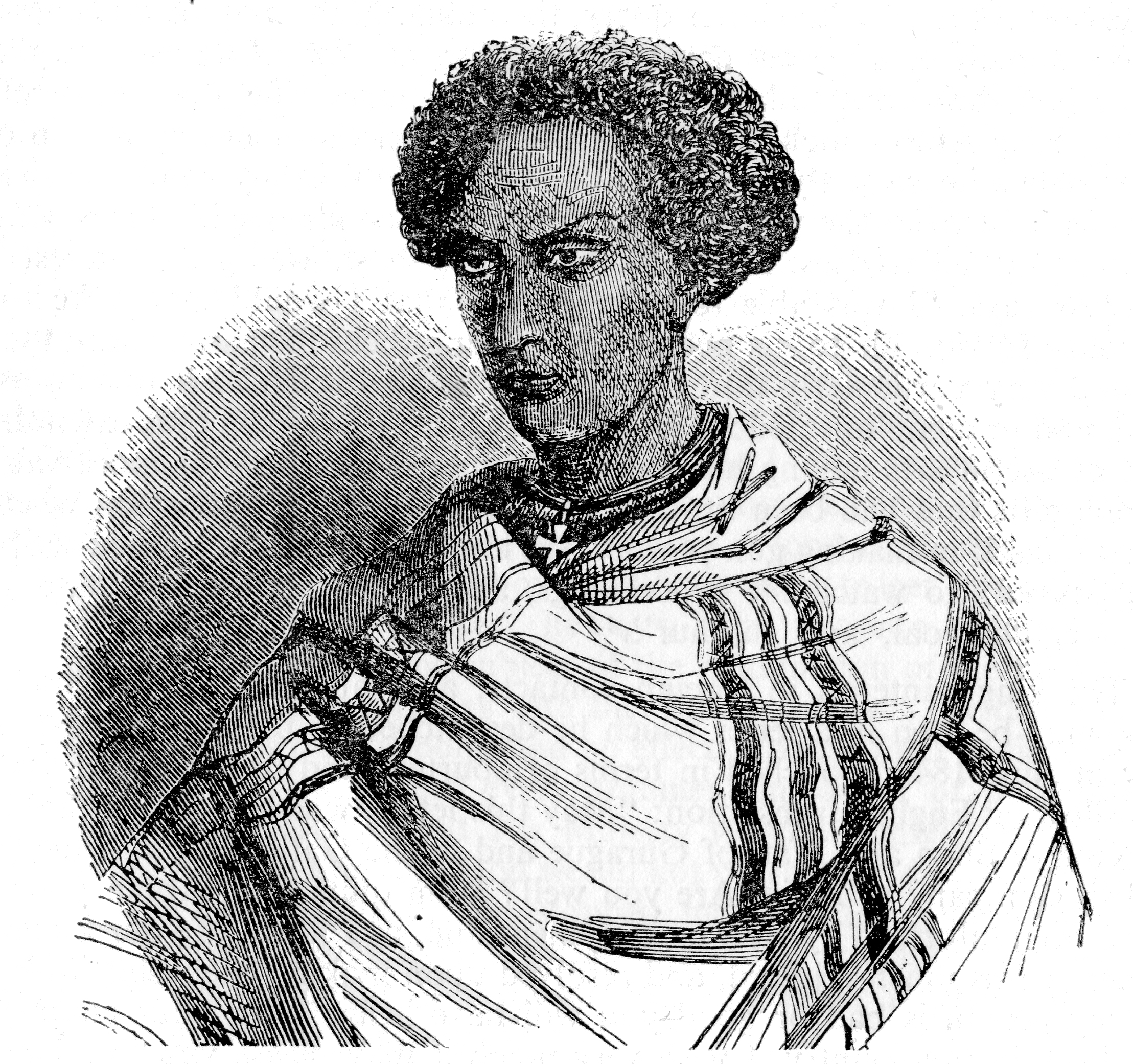
King Sahle Selassie of Shewa

The Kingdom of Shewa was a distinct historical monarch in central Ethiopia. It is universally recognized as one of the primary heartlands of the Amhara people. It functioned as an autonomous kingdom with its own ruling dynasty, military structure, and political institutions documented as early as the 11th century. Following the collapse of the Aksumite Kingdom, Kingdom of Shewa emerged as a consolidated kingdom with significant regional influence.

== History ==
Historical and traditional records indicate that Shewa existed parallel to the Aksumite Empire. Rather than being a completely new territory that appeared only after Aksum fell, Shewa functioned as a highly integrated, southern geographic region and distinct political landscape during the first millennium CE. Following the collapse of the Aksumite Empire, Shewa served as a crucial highland refuge for fleeing Christian populations, nobility, and royal lineages. The name Shewa is traditionally believed to have derived from an Amharic root meaning "to save" or "rescue" because it served as a safe haven for the Aksumite imperial bloodline. It subsequently served as the geopolitical staging ground from which Emperor Yekuno Amlak restored the Solomonic imperial dynasty in 1270 and ultimately became the base from which the modern Ethiopian empire was re-unified in the late 19th century under Menelik II.

The Ser'ate Gebr (Royal Court Rituals), ancient texts detailing palace protocols, crown inheritances, and state history explicitly name King Dil Ne'ad as the last ruler in Aksum who fled south in 940, asserting that his descendants maintained a parallel "kingdom in exile" in Shewa for exactly 330 years before the rise of Emperor Yekuno Amlak. The names of the exile royal line is as follows:

1. DilNe'ad (ድልነዓድ )
2. Agbea Tsion (አግብአ ጽዮን )
3. Tsenfe Ared (ጽንፈ አርዕድ)
4. Negash Zore (ነጋሽ ዞሬ)
5. Asfeh (አስፍሕ)
6. Yakob (ያዕቆብ)
7. Baher Aseged (ባሕር አሰግድ)
8. Edm Aseged (እድም አሰግድ)
9. Yekuno Amlak ( ይኩኖ አምላክ)

According to tradition, Yekuno Amlak was sent to the monastery of Debre Hayq Estifanos in Bete Amhara. He was later returned to Shewa, where he rose to power and restored the Solomonic dynasty in the 13th century.

=== Names and Dates (Ethiopian Calendar) of Kings and Emperors in Shewa ===
Sources:

1. Emperor Yekuno Amlak (from 1253 to 1268 E.C.)
2. Emperor Agba Zion (from 1268 to 1277 E.C.)
3. Emperor Tsenfe Ar’ed (from 1277 to 1278 E.C.)
4. Emperor Hizba Asged (from 1278 to 1279 E.C.)
5. Emperor Qidme Asged (from 1279 to 1280 E.C.)
6. Emperor Jan Asged (from 1280 to 1281 E.C.)
7. Emperor Seba'a Asged (from 1281 to 1282 E.C.)
8. Emperor Wedem Ar’ed (from 1282 to 1297 E.C.)
9. Emperor Amda Zion I (from 1297 to 1327 E.C.)
10. Emperor Sayfa Ar'ed (from 1327 to 1355 E.C.)
11. Emperor Wedem Asfere (from 1355 to 1365 E.C.)
12. Emperor Dawit (from 1365 to 1395 E.C.)
13. Emperor Tewodros I (from 1395 to 1399 E.C.)
14. Emperor Yeshaq (from 1399 to 1414 E.C.)
15. Emperor Eskendiyas (Eskender) (ruled for only a few months in 1414 E.C.)
16. Emperor Hizbnan (from 1414 to 1418 E.C.)
17. Emperor Bedlenan (from 1418 to 1419 E.C.)
18. Emperor Amda Iyasus "Dawit" (from 1419 to 1426 E.C.)
19. Emperor Zara Yaqob (from 1426 to 1460 E.C.)
20. Emperor Baeda Maryam (from 1460 to 1470 E.C.)
21. Emperor Eskender (from 1470 to 1486 E.C.)
22. Emperor Amda Zion II (from 1486 to 1487 E.C.)
23. Emperor Na'od (from 1487 to 1500 E.C.)
24. Emperor Libne Dingil (from 1500 to 1532 E.C.)
25. Emperor Gelawdewos (from 1532 to 1551 E.C.)
26. Emperor Minas (from 1551 to 1555 E.C.)

Following the invasion of Gragn, the capital of Ethiopia moved to Gondar. These are the rulers who were kings only in Shewa:

1. Abeto Yaqob
2. Abeto Segwe Qal
3. Abeto Negasi (Negasi Christos)
4. Abeto Sibiste (Sebastianos)
5. Merid Azmach Abuye
6. Merid Azmach Amhayes (Amha Iyasus)
7. Merid Azmach Asfa Wossen
8. Merid Azmach Wossen Seged
9. King Sahle Selassie
10. King Haile Melekot

Those who ruled the whole of Ethiopia once again from Shewa:

1. Emperor Menelik
2. Empress Zewditu
3. Emperor Haile Selassie
