= Bernos =

Cloak type

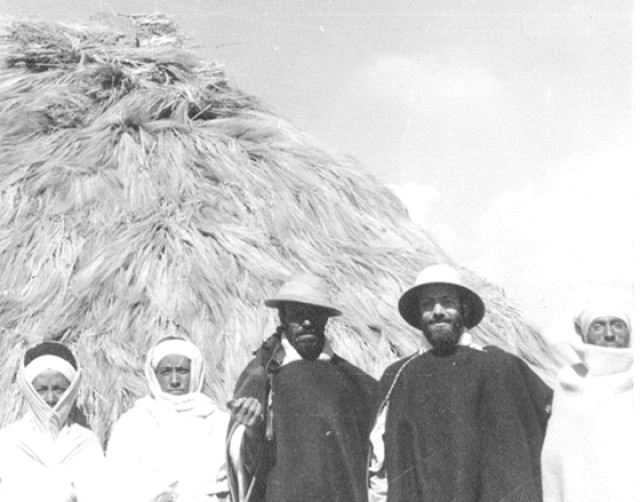
Amhara aristocrat dressed in tradition cloak (Bernos) with Donald Levine

A bernos (Note: Also transliterated as barnos and burnos) (Amharic: በርኖስ) is a wool cloak-like garment and hood woven in one piece, traditionally worn by men of the Amhara ethnic group of Ethiopia, most commonly in the relatively cold Shewa. Unlike its Maghrebi counterpart the Burnous, it is typically black, and does not have a hood; rather it has a large point on one side of the shoulder, usually to the left. The point was tailored into existence in order to keep a rifle on their shoulders, so that highlander men would not have to hold them outside where rainwater entering through a muzzle might damage (an older) firearm. Donald N. Levine notes that the wealthier men of Menz "wear the barnos, a tailored cape made of dark wool." The Bernos can be worn in white, beige, black and sometimes made out of linen if it is too hot to wear in wool, underneath a Tunic and Gabi would be worn.

The bernos was frequently worn by the prominent and elite highlanders. Today, average citizens sometimes wear it in traditional ceremonies and at special occasions. Social status is indicated by the garment's decorative pattern.

== See also ==
- Netela
- Gabi
