= Habesha peoples =

Ethnic or pan-ethnic identifier used to refer to Ethiopians and Eritreans

Habesha
Ge'ez: ሐበሠተ, romanized: Ḥäbäśät Amharic: ሐበሻ, romanized: Häbäša Tigrinya: ሓበሻ, romanized: Ḥabäša
- Tigrayan man (Left) and Amhara woman (right). Both are Habesha ethnic groups in Ethiopia.

Regions with significant populations
- Ethiopia and Eritrea: 29,596,827

Languages
- Amharic, Tigrinya

Religion
- Predominately: Oriental Orthodox Christianity; Minorities: Sunni Islam, Protestant Christianity (P'ent'ay) and Judaism (Beta Israel)

Related ethnic groups
- Other Afroasiatic and Semitic peoples of the Middle East and North Africa

Habesha peoples (Ge'ez: ሐበሠተ; Amharic: ሐበሻ; Tigrinya: ሓበሻ; commonly used exonym: Abyssinians) is a complex cultural and historical identifier that does not strictly define a single ethnic group. Historically, the term referred primarily to the Amhara, Tigrayan-Tigrinya and Gurage peoples.

== Etymology ==
The oldest reference to Habesha was in second or third century Sabaean engravings as Ḥbśt or Ḥbštm recounting the South Arabian involvement of the nəgus ("king") GDRT of ḤBŠT. The term appears to refer to a group of peoples, rather than a specific ethnicity. Another Sabaean inscription describes an alliance between Shamir Yuhahmid of the Himyarite Kingdom and King `DBH of ḤBŠT in the first quarter of the third century. However, South Arabian expert Eduard Glaser claimed that the Egyptian hieroglyphic ḫbstjw, used in reference to "a foreign people from the incense-producing regions" (i.e. Land of Punt) by Pharaoh Hatshepsut in 1450 BC, was the first usage of the term or somehow connected. Francis Breyer also believes the Egyptian demonym to be the source of the Semitic term.

The first attestation of late Latin Abissensis is from the fifth century CE. The 6th-century author Stephanus of Byzantium later used the term "Αβασηνοί" (i.e. Abasēnoi) to refer to "an Arabian people living next to the Sabaeans together with the Ḥaḍramites." The region of the Abasēnoi produce[d] myrrh, incense and cotton and they cultivate[d] a plant which yields a purple dye (probably wars, i.e. Fleminga grahamiana). It lay on a route which leads from Zabīd on the coastal plain to the Ḥimyarite capital Ẓafār. Abasēnoi was located by Hermann von Wissman as a region in the Jabal Ḥubaysh mountain in Ibb Governorate, perhaps related in etymology with the ḥbš Semitic root). Other place names in Yemen contain the ḥbš root, such as the Jabal Ḥabaši, whose residents are still called al-Aḥbuš (pl. of Ḥabaš). The location of the Abasēnoi in Yemen may perhaps be explained by remnant Aksumite populations from the 520s conquest by King Kaleb. King Ezana's claims to Sahlen (Saba) and Dhu-Raydan (Himyar) during a time when such control was unlikely may indicate an Aksumite presence or coastal foothold. Traditional scholarship has assumed that the Habashat were a tribe from modern-day Yemen that migrated to Ethiopia and Eritrea. However, the Sabaic inscriptions only use the term ḥbšt to the refer to the Kingdom of Aksum and its inhabitants, especially during the 3rd century, when the ḥbšt (Aksumites) were often at war with the Sabaeans and Himyraites. Modern Western European languages, including English, appear to borrow this term from the post-classical form Abissini in the mid-sixteenth century. (English Abyssin is attested from 1576, and Abissinia and Abyssinia from the 1620s.)

=== Usage ===
The term "Habesha" is used to represent northern Ethiopian Highland Semitic-speaking Amhara, Tigrayan, and Tigrinya people.

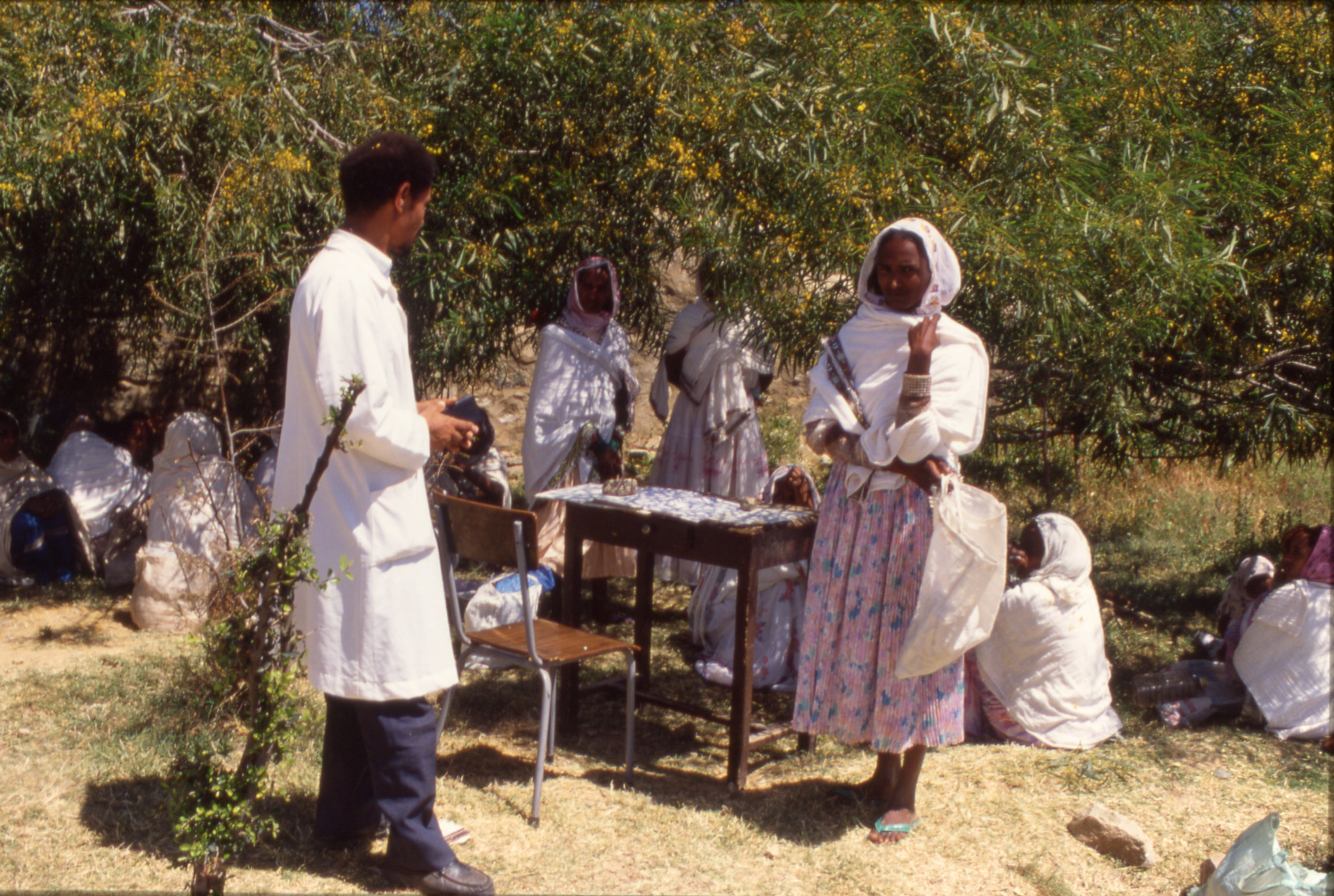
Tigrinya ethnic group of Eritrea at Emba Derho Clinic, Eritrea

According to Gerard Prunier, one very restrictive use of the term today by some Tigrayans refers exclusively to speakers of Tigrinya; however, Tigrayan oral traditions and linguistic evidence bear witness to ancient and constant relations with Amharas. Some Gurage societies, such as Orthodox Christian communities where Soddo is spoken, identify as Habesha and have a strong sense of Ethiopian national identity, due in part to their ancient ties with the northern Habesha.

Muslim ethnic groups primarily located in the Eritrean Highlands, including the Tigre, as well as those in the Ethiopian Highlands, have historically resisted the designation of Habesha. Instead, Eritrean and Ethiopian Muslims were commonly identified as the Jeberti people. Another term for Muslims from the Horn of Africa was '"Al-Zaylai"', this applied to even the empress Eleni of Ethiopia due to her ties to the state of Hadiya. At the turn of the 20th century, elites of the Solomonic dynasty employed the conversion of various ethnic groups to Orthodox Tewahedo Christianity and the imposition of the Amharic language to spread a common Habesha national identity.

Within Ethiopian and Eritrean diasporic populations, some second generation immigrants have adopted the term "Habesha" in a broader sense as a supra-national ethnic identifier inclusive of all Eritreans and Ethiopians. For those who employ the term, it serves as a useful counter to more exclusionary identities such as "Amhara" or "Tigrayan". However, this usage is not uncontested: On the one hand, those who grew up in Ethiopia or Eritrea may object to the obscuring of national specificity. On the other hand, groups that were subjugated in Ethiopia or Eritrea sometimes find the term offensive.

== Origins ==
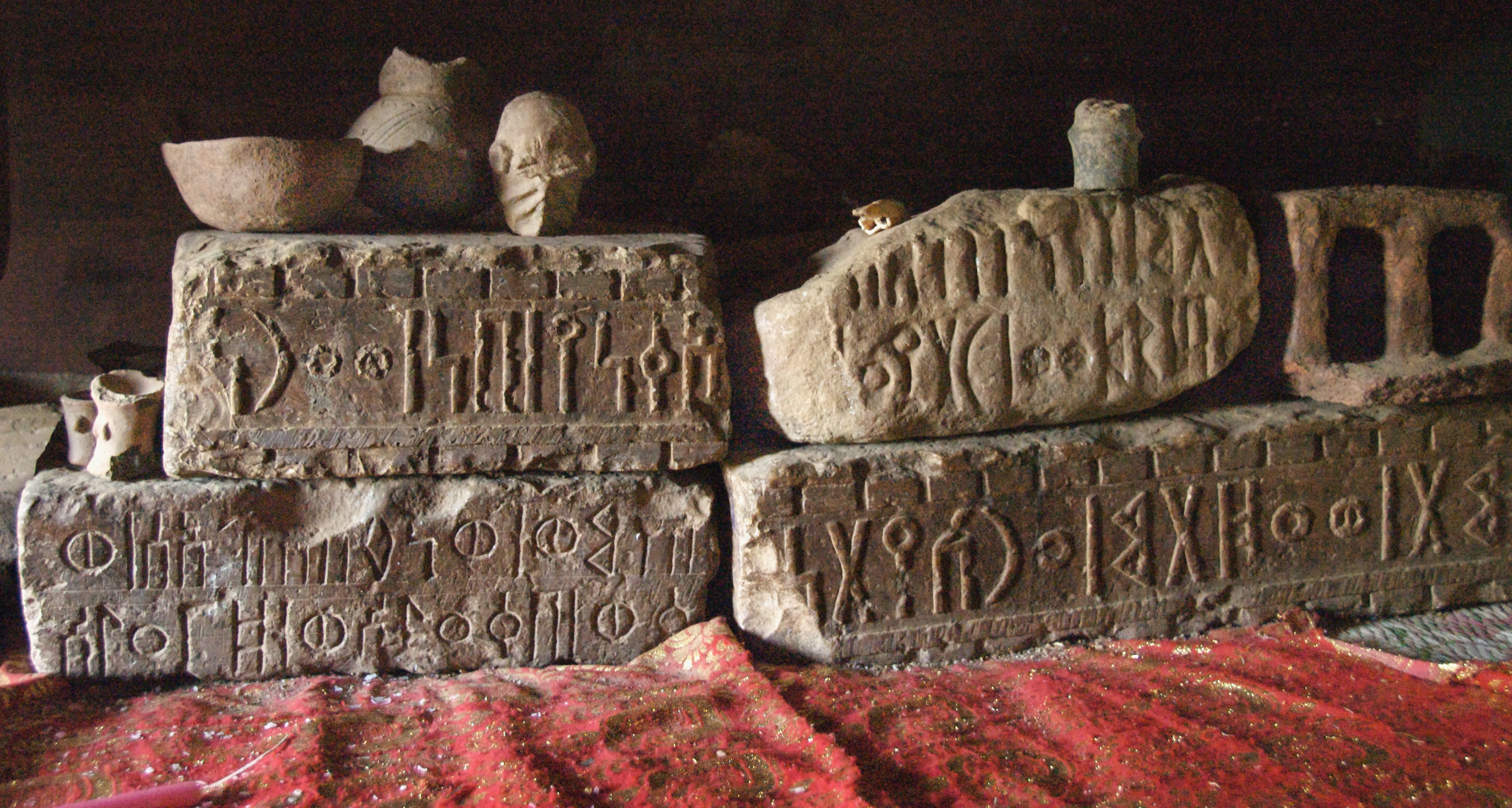
Ancient stone slabs with Sabaean inscriptions found at Yeha, Ethiopia.

European scholars postulated that the ancient communities that evolved into the modern Ethiopian state were formed by a migration across the Red Sea of Sabaean-speaking South Arabian tribes, including one called the "Habashat", who intermarried with the local non-Semitic-speaking peoples, in around 1,000 BC. Many held to this view because "epigraphic and monumental evidence point to an indisputable South Arabian influence suggesting migration and colonization from Yemen in the early 1st millennium BC as the main factor of state formation on the highlands. Rock inscriptions in Qohayto (Akkala Guzay, Eritrea) document the presence of individuals or small groups from Arabia on the highlands at this time." It was first suggested by German orientalist Hiob Ludolf and revived by early 20th-century Italian scholar Conti Rossini. According to this theory, Sabaeans brought with them South Arabian letters and language, which gradually evolved into the Ge'ez language and Ge'ez script. Linguists have revealed, however, that although its script developed from Epigraphic South Arabian (whose oldest inscriptions are found in Yemen), Ge'ez is descended from a different branch of Southern Semitic, Ethiosemitic or Ethiopic sub-branch. South Arabian inscriptions does not mention any migration to the west coast of the Red Sea, nor of a tribe called "Habashat." All uses of the term date to the 3rd century AD and later, when they referred to the people of the Kingdom of Aksum. Edward Ullendorff has asserted that the Tigrayans and the Amhara comprise "Abyssinians proper" and a "Semitic outpost," while Donald N. Levine has argued that this view "neglects the crucial role of non-Semitic elements in Ethiopian culture." Edward Ullendorff and Carlo Conti Rossini's theory that Ethiosemitic-language speakers of the northern Ethiopian Highlands were ancient foreigners from South Arabia that displaced the original peoples of the Horn has been disputed by Ethiopian scholars specializing in Ethiopian Studies such as Messay Kebede and Daniel E. Alemu who generally disagree with this theory arguing that the migration was one of reciprocal exchange, if it even occurred at all. In the 21st century, scholars have largely discounted the longstanding presumption that Sabaean migrants had played a direct role in Ethiopian civilization.

Scholars have determined that the ancient Semitic language of Ethiopia was not derived from the Sabaean language. Recent linguistic studies as to the origin of the Ethiosemitic languages seem to support the DNA findings of immigration from the Arabian Peninsula, with a recent study using Bayesian computational phylogenetic techniques finding that contemporary Ethiosemitic languages of Africa reflect a single introduction of early Ethiosemitic from southern Arabia approximately 2,800 years ago, and that this single introduction of Ethiosemitic subsequently underwent quick diversification within Ethiopia and Eritrea. There is also evidence of ancient Southern Arabian communities in modern-day Ethiopia and Eritrea in certain localities, attested by some archaeological artifacts and ancient Sabaean inscriptions in the old South Arabian alphabet. Joseph W. Michels noted based on his archeological surveying Aksumite sites that "there is abundant evidence of specific Sabean traits such as inscription style, religious ideology and symbolism, art style and architectural techniques." However, Stuart Munro-Hay points to the existence of an older D'MT kingdom, prior to any Sabaean migration c. 4th or 5th century BC, as well as evidence that Sabaean immigrants had resided in Ethiopia for little more than a few decades at the time of the inscriptions. Both the indigenous languages of Southern Arabia and the Amharic and Tigrinya languages of Ethiopia belong to the large branch of South Semitic languages which in turn is part of the Afro-Asiatic Language Family. Even though the Ethiosemitic languages are classified under the South Semitic languages branch with a Cushitic language substratum.

Munro-May and related scholars believe that Sabaean influence was minor, limited to a few localities, and disappearing after a few decades or a century. It may have represented a trading colony (trading post) or military installations in a symbiotic or military alliance between the Sabaeans and D`MT.

In the reign of King Ezana, c. early 4th century AD, the term "Ethiopia" is listed as one of the nine regions under his domain, translated in the Greek version of his inscription as Αἰθιοπία Aithiopía. This is the first known use of this term to describe specifically the region known today as Ethiopia (and not Kush or the entire African and Indian region outside of Egypt).

There are many theories regarding the beginning of the Abyssinian civilization. One theory, which is more widely accepted today, locates its origins in the Horn region. At a later period, this culture was exposed to Judaic influence, of which the best-known examples are the Qemant and Ethiopian Jews (or Beta Israel) ethnic groups, but Judaic customs, terminology, and beliefs can be found amongst the dominant culture of the Amhara and Tigrinya. Some scholars have claimed that the Indian alphabets had been used to create the vowel system of the Ge'ez abugida, this claim has not yet been effectively proven.

== History ==
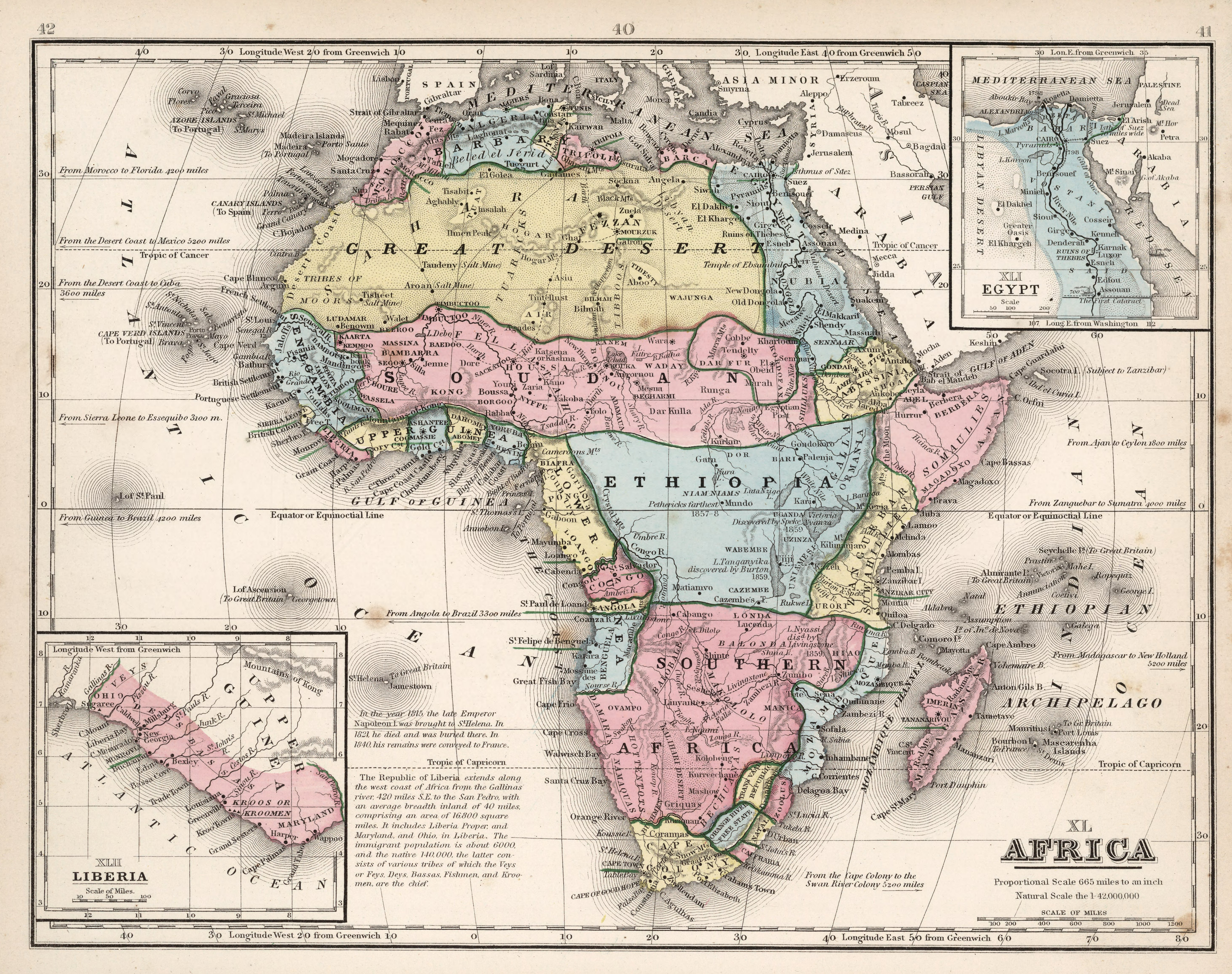
Abyssinia depicted on map before 1884 Berlin Conference to divide Africa.

Abyssinian civilization has its roots in the pre-Aksumite culture. An early kingdom to arise was that of D'mt in the 8th century BC. The Kingdom of Aksum, one of the powerful civilizations of the ancient world, was based there from about 150 BC to the mid of 12th century AD. Spreading far beyond the city of Aksum, it molded one of the earliest cultures of Ethiopia and Eritrea. Architectural remains include finely carved stelae, extensive palaces, and ancient places of worship that are still being used.

Around the time that the Aksumite empire began to decline, the burgeoning religion of Islam made its first inroads in the Abyssinian highlands. During the first Hijrah, the companions of Muhammad were received in the Aksumite kingdom. The Sultanate of Shewa, established around 896, was one of the oldest local Muslim states. It was centered in the former Shewa province in central Ethiopia. The polity was succeeded by the Sultanate of Ifat around 1285. Ifat was governed from its capital at Zeila in northern Somalia.

=== Antiquity ===
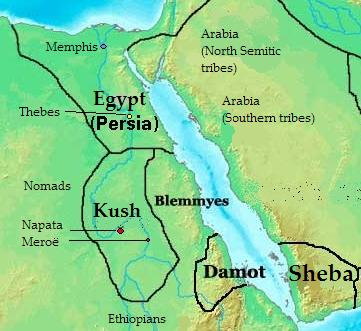
Approximate realm of the ancient Kingdom of Dʿmt.

Throughout history, populations in the Horn of Africa had been interacting through migration, trade, warfare and intermarriage. Most people in the region spoke Afroasiatic languages, with the family's Cushitic and Semitic branches predominant. As early as the 3rd millennium BCE, the pre-Aksumites had begun trading along the Red Sea. They mainly traded with Egypt. Earlier trade expeditions were taken by foot along the Nile Valley. The ancient Egyptians' main objective in the Red Sea trade was to acquire myrrh. This was a commodity that the Horn region, which the ancient Egyptians referred to as the Land of Punt, had in abundance. Much of the incense is produced in Somalia to this day.

The Kingdom of Aksum may have been founded as early as 300 BCE. Very little is known of the time period between the mid-1st millennium BCE to the beginning of Aksum's rise around the 1st century CE. It is thought to be a successor kingdom of Dʿmt, a kingdom in the early 1st millennium BC most likely centered at nearby Yeha.

The Kingdom of Aksum was situated in northern Ethiopia and Eritrea, with its capital city in Northern Ethiopia. Axum remained its capital until the 7th century. The kingdom was favorably located near the Blue Nile basin and the Afar depression. The former is rich in gold and the latter in salt: both materials having a highly important use to the Aksumites. Aksum was accessible to the port of Adulis, Eritrea on the coast of the Red Sea. The kingdom traded with Egypt, India, Arabia and the Byzantine Empire. Aksum's "fertile" and "well-watered" location produced enough food for its population. Wild animals included elephants and rhinoceros.

From its capital, Aksum commanded the trade of ivory. It also dominated the trade route in the Red Sea leading to the Gulf of Aden. Its success depended on resourceful techniques, production of coins, steady migrations of Greco-Roman merchants, and ships landing at Adulis. In exchange for Aksum's goods, traders bid many kinds of cloth, jewelry, metals and steel for weapons.

At its peak, Aksum controlled territories as far as southern Egypt, east to the Gulf of Aden, south to the Omo River, and west to the Nubian Kingdom of Meroë. The South Arabian kingdom of the Himyarites was under the influence of Aksum.

== The Fall of Aksum ==
The Aksumite Empire begun to collapse roughly between 7th-10th century CE driven by economic isolation due to rising Islamic power in the Red Sea, environmental degradation, and shifting political power southwards. The shift to support itself through agricultural subsistence away from international trade, combined with internal instability and reign of queen Yodit Gudit caused the once great maritime empire to become a secluded, inland state with its capital abandoned and its urban centers falling into ruin.

Key factors in the eradication of Aksumite Empire

- Economic Isolation (7th-8th Century): The rise of Arab Muslim traders who took control of the Red Sea routes effectively severed Aksum's connections to the Byzantine world and the Mediterranean,destroying the trade-based economy. The loss of Red Sea ports like Adulis forced the population to move deeper into the Ethiopian highlands for protection. Even though the Axumite Kingdom welcomed and protected the companions of Muhammad to Ethiopia, who came as refugees to escape the persecution of the ruling families of Mecca and earned the friendship and respect of Muhammad. Their friendship deteriorated when South-Arabians invaded the Dahlak islands through the port of Adulis and destroyed it, which was the economic backbone for the prosperous Aksumite Kingdom.
- Environmental Failure: Subsistence became impossible due to environmental conditions that caused draught and famine. Survivors were forced to abandon the northern plateau and migrate south into the more humid and fertile central Ethiopian highlands.
- Rise of the Zagwe Dynasty: A non-Christian queen called Gudit or Yodit defeated the remaining Aksumite cities in the late 10th century, destroying monuments and burning churches to end the last remnants of the old dynasty. Political center of power shifted to the south (Lalibela), replacing the Aksumite Dynasty with the Zagwe dynasty by 1137CE.

This southward shift ultimately moved the political center away from Aksum forever. Despite the collapse of the empire, the Aksumite lineage was not completely erased. Queen Yodit sought to exterminate the ruling Solomonic dynasty to consolidate her power and eliminate the influence of the Aksumite establishment. She succeeded in completely dismantling the empire's religious and political infrastructure. During her campaign, she is said to have captured and executed members of the royal family. According to Ethiopian tradition Prince Anbessa Wudem fled to Shewa to preserve the lineage and establish its capital. This allowed the royal bloodline to survive in exile.

== The Rise of the Solomonic Dynasty ==
The Solomonic dynasty was restored in 1270 CE when Yekuno Amlak overthrew the last ruler of the Zagwe dynasty, Yetbarek. This transition marked a pivotal shift in Ethiopian political history, as Yekuno Amlak justified his seizure of power by claiming direct patrilineal descent from the ancient Aksumite kings and, through them, the biblical King Solomon and the Queen of Sheba. The Solomonic dynasty moved the empire's political center further south and inaugurated a long-standing period of imperial rule that sought to restore the prestige and territorial reach of the former Aksumite state. Tegulet served as a key administrative and political center. Ankober was also founded as an alternate capital. Barara was a major capital in later years between the 15th and early 16th centuries particularly during the reign of Emperor Dawit I or Zara yaqob. Barara was destroyed in the 1530s during the conquest of Ahmad ibn Ibrahim al-Ghazi.

In the middle of the sixteenth century Adal Sultanate armies led by Somali leader Ahmed Ibrahim invaded Habesha lands in what is known as the "Conquest of Habasha". In the late sixteenth century the nomad pastoralist Oromo people penetrated the Habesha plains occupying large territories during the Oromo migrations.

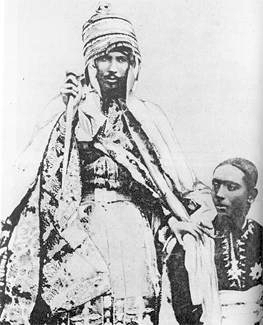
Emperor Yohannes IV with his son and heir, Ras Araya Selassie Yohannes.

The war with Ahmed Ibrahim forced the Solomonic dynasty to move its seat from Shewa to Gondar. The Gondarian dynasty, which since the 16th century had become the centre of Royal pomp and ceremony of Abyssinia, finally lost its influence as a result of the emergence of powerful regional lords, following the murder of Iyasu I, also known as Iyasu the Great. The decline in the prestige of the dynasty led to the semi-anarchic era of Zemene Mesafint ("Era of the Princes"), in which rival warlords fought for power and the Yejju Oromo enderases (Amharic: እንደራሴ, "regents") had effective control. The emperors were considered to be figureheads. Until a young man named Kassa Haile Giorgis also known as Emperor Tewodros brought end to Zemene Mesafint by defeating all his rivals and took the throne in 1855. The Tigrayans made only a brief return to the throne in the person of Yohannes IV in 1872, whose death in 1889 resulted in the power base shifting back to the dominant Amharic-speaking elite. His successor Menelik II an Emperor of Amhara origin seized power. Upon Menelik's occupation of the Harar Emirate and other neighboring states, a considerable number of natives were displaced and Abyssinians settled in their place. In Arsi Province, mainly inhabited by the Oromo people, their land was appropriated by the Abyssinian colonizers coupled with hefty taxation which led to a revolt in the 1960s.

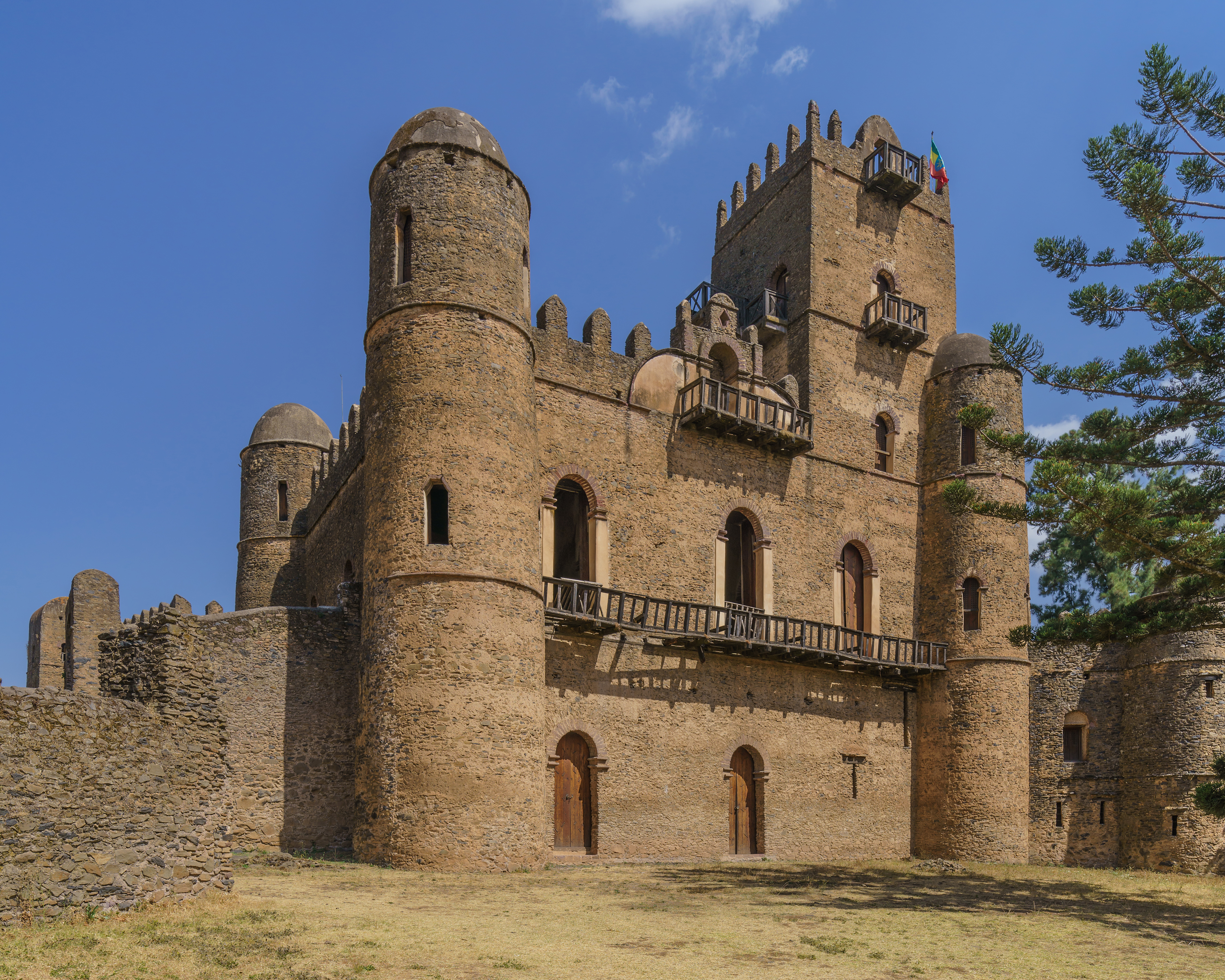
Fasilides' Castle in Gondar, Amhara Region.

Some scholars consider the Amhara to have been Ethiopia's ruling elite for centuries, represented by the Solomonic line of Emperors ending in Haile Selassie I. Marcos Lemma and other scholars dispute the accuracy of such a statement, arguing that other ethnic groups have always been active in the country's politics. This confusion may largely stem from the mislabeling of all Amharic-speakers as "Amhara", and the fact that many people from other ethnic groups have adopted Amharic names. Another is the claim that most Ethiopians can trace their ancestry to multiple ethnic groups, including Emperor Haile Selassie I and Empress Menen Asfaw of Ambassel.

The Abyssinian Baptist Church was founded when visiting Ethiopian seamen and free African-American parishioners left the First Baptist Church in protest over being restricted to racially segregated seating. They named their new congregation the Abyssinian Baptist Church after the historic name of Ethiopia. While originally used to refer specifically to Abyssinia, the term later became more broadly used to refer to Africans of any ethnicity. Similarly, this term for Siddis is held to be derived from the common name for the captains of the Abyssinian ships that also first delivered Siddi slaves to the subcontinent. Historian Richard M. Eaton states Habshis were initially pagans sold by Ethiopian Christians to Gujarati merchants for Indian textiles. Abyssinian Meeting House, is also historic church in Portland, Maine.

== Culture ==
The Habesha developed an agricultural society, which most continue, including raising of camels, donkeys, and sheep. They plow using oxen. The Orthodox Church is an integral part of the culture. The church buildings are built on hills. Major celebrations during the year are held around the church, where people gather from villages all around to sing, play games, and observe the unique mass of the church. It includes a procession through the church grounds and environs.

Coffee is a very important ceremonial drink. The "coffee ceremony" is common to the Ethiopians and Eritreans. Beans are roasted on the spot, ground, and brewed, served thick and rich in tiny ceramic cups with no handles. This amount of coffee can be finished in one gulp if drunk cold; but, traditionally it is drunk very slowly as conversation takes place. When the beans are roasted to smoking, they are passed around the table, where the smoke becomes a blessing on the diners. The traditional food served at these meals consists of injera, a spongy flat bread, served with wat, a spicy meat sauce.

Houses in rural areas are built mostly from rock and dirt, the most available resources, with structure provided by timber poles. The houses blend in easily with the natural surroundings. Many times the nearest water source is more than a kilometer away from the house. In addition, people must search for fuel for their fires throughout the surrounding area.

The Habesha people have a rich heritage of music and dance, using drums and stringed instruments tuned to a pentatonic scale. Arts and crafts and secular music are performed mostly by artisans, who are regarded with suspicion. Sacred music is performed and icons are painted only by men trained in monasteries.

=== Northern Highlander Language and literature ===
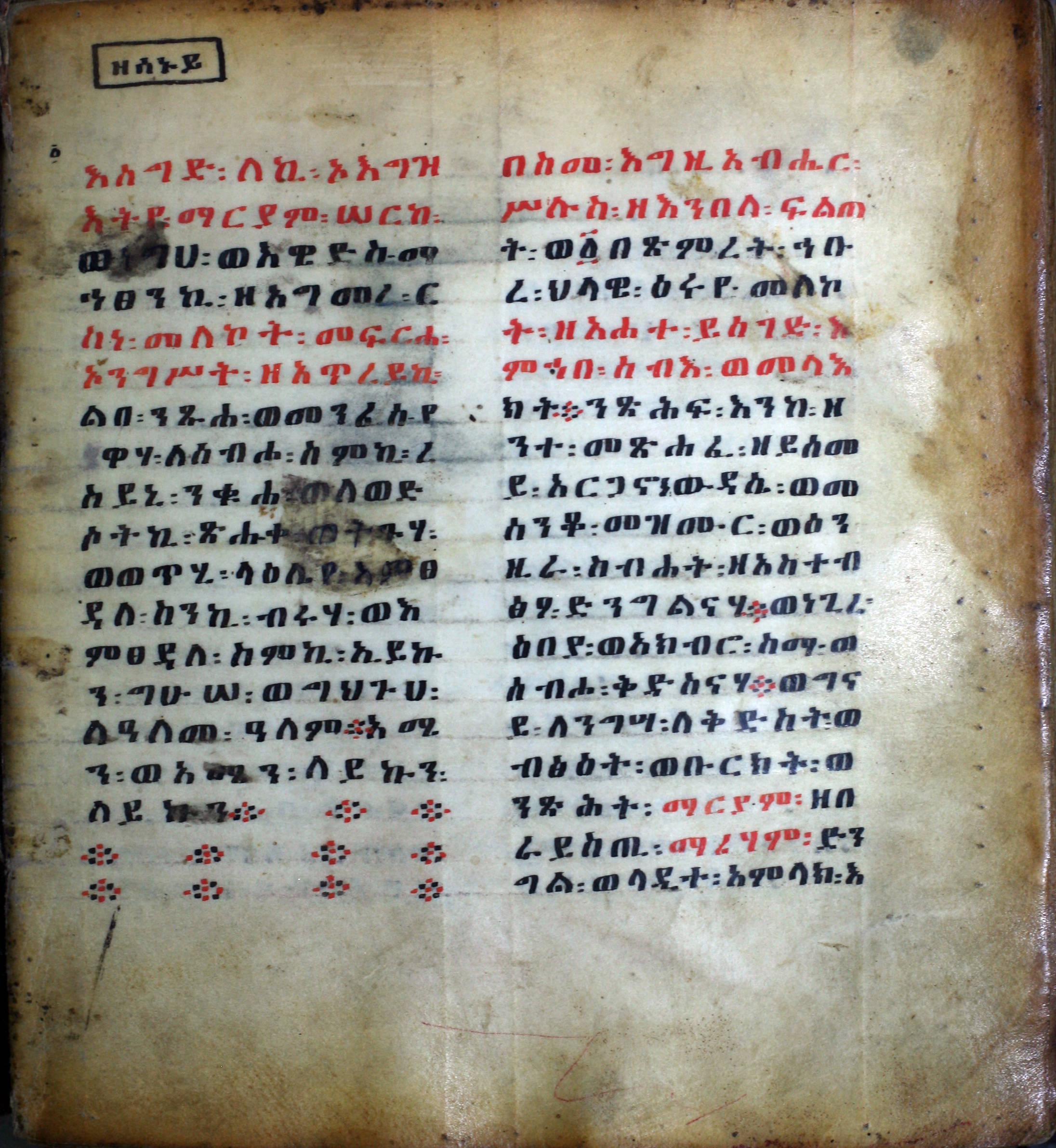
The Ge'ez script on a 15th-century Ethiopian Coptic prayer book.

Abyssinians speak languages belonging to the Ethiopian Semitic branch of the Afroasiatic family. Among these tongues is the classical Ge'ez language. The kingdom of Dʿmt wrote proto-Ge'ez in Epigraphic South Arabian as early as the 9th century BCE. Later, an independent script replaced it as early as the 5th century BCE.^{2}

Ge'ez literature is considered to begin with the adoption of Christianity in Ethiopia and Eritrea, as well as the civilization of Axum in the 4th century BCE during the reign of Ezana. While Ge'ez today is extinct and only used for liturgical purposes in the Eritrean Orthodox Tewahedo Church and Ethiopian Orthodox Tewahedo Church. Ge'ez language is ancestral to Tigre and Tigrinya languages.

In antiquity Ge'ez-speaking people inhabited the Aksumite Empire; the ancient Semitic-speaking Gafat inhabited Eastern Damot (East Welega) and Western Shewa; the Galila clan of Aymallal (Soddo) inhabited Southwest Shewa; the Zay inhabited East Shewa; the Harla who are the ancestors of Harari lived in Somalia; and the other ancient Argobba and Harari inhabited Shewa, Ifat, and Adal.

=== Customs ===
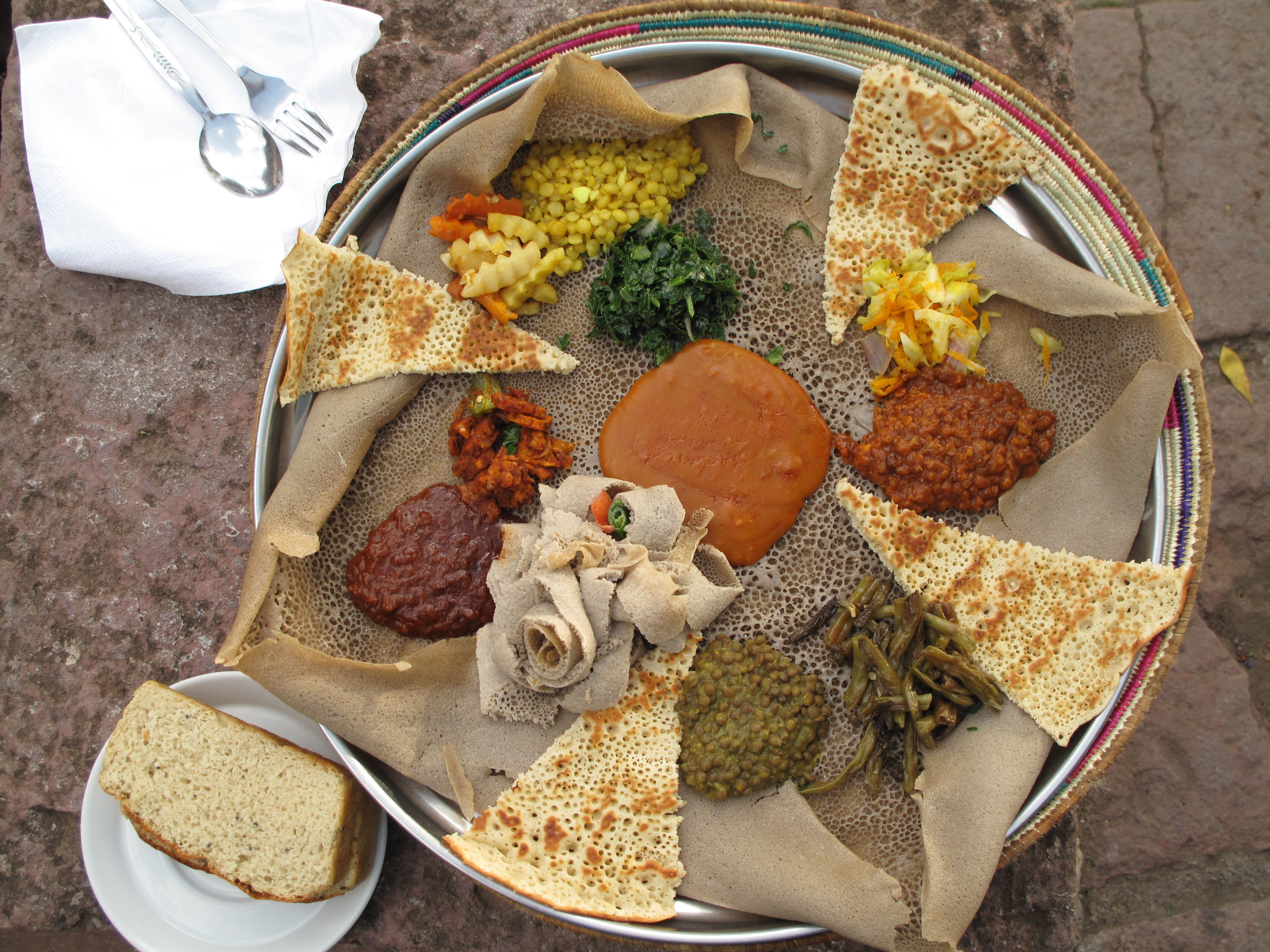
Traditional Habesha injera

Throughout history, various European travelers such as Jeronimo Lobo, James Bruce and Mansfield Parkyns visited Abyssinia. Their written accounts about their experiences include observations and descriptions of the Abyssinian customs and manners.

Cuisine

Habesha cuisine characteristically consists of vegetable and often very spicy meat dishes, usually in the form of wat (also w'et or wot), a thick stew, served atop injera, a large sourdough flatbread, which is about 50 centimeters (20 inches) in diameter and made out of fermented teff flour. People of Ethiopia and Eritrea eat exclusively with their right hands, using pieces of injera to pick up bites of entrées and side dishes.

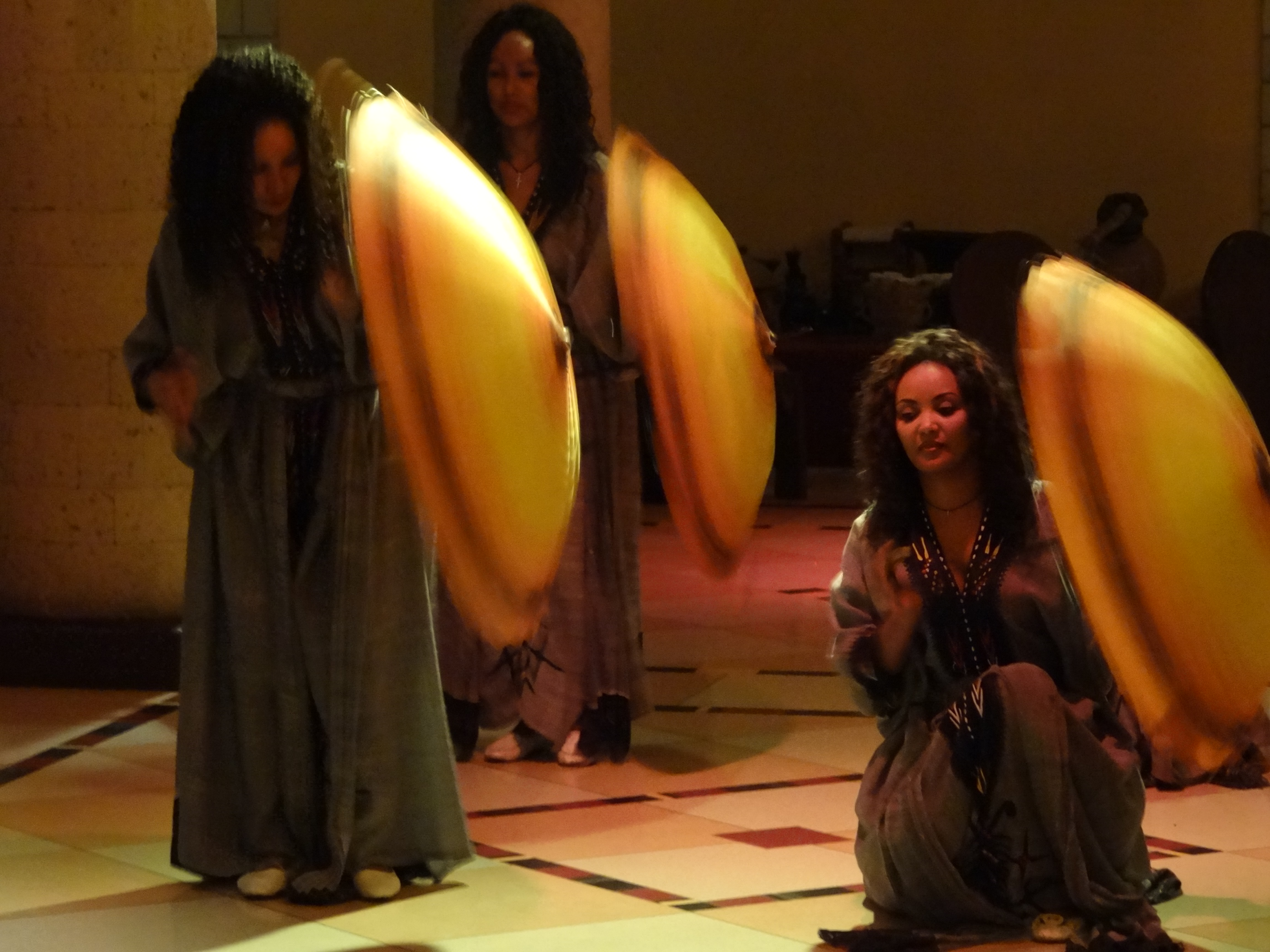
Habesha women in traditional Habesha kemis performing a folklore dance.

Fit-fit, or fir-fir, is a common breakfast dish. It is made from shredded injera or kitcha stir-fried with spices or wat. Another popular breakfast food is fatira. The delicacy consists of a large fried pancake made with flour, often with a layer of egg, eaten with honey. Chechebsa (or kita firfir) resembles a pancake covered with berbere and niter kibbeh, or spices, and may be eaten with a spoon. A porridge, genfo is another common breakfast dish. It is usually served in a large bowl with a dug-out made in the middle of the genfo and filled with spiced niter kibbeh.

Wat begins with a large amount of chopped red onion, which is simmered or sauteed in a pot. Once the onions have softened, niter kebbeh (or, in the case of vegan dishes, vegetable oil) is added. Following this, berbere is added to make a spicy keiy wat or keyyih tsebhi. Turmeric is used instead of bebere for a milder alicha wat or both are omitted when making vegetable stews, atkilt wat. Meat such as beef (Amharic: ሥጋ, səga), chicken (Amharic: ዶሮ, doro) or Tigrinya: ደርሆ, derho), fish (Amharic: ዓሣ, asa), goat or lamb (Amharic: በግ, beg or Tigrinya: በጊ, beggi) is also added. Legumes such as split peas (Amharic: ክክ, kək or Tigrinya: ኪኪ, kikki) or lentils (Amharic: ምስር, məsər or birsin); or vegetables such as potatoes (Amharic: ድንች, Dənəch), carrots and chard (Amharic: ቆስጣ) are also used instead in vegan dishes.

Another distinctively Habesha dish is kitfo (frequently spelled ketfo). It consists of raw (or rare) beef mince marinated in mitmita (Amharic: ሚጥሚጣ mīṭmīṭā, a very spicy chili powder similar to the berbere) and niter kibbeh. Gored gored is very similar to kitfo, but uses cubed rather than ground beef. The Ethiopian Orthodox Church prescribes a number of fasting (tsom Ge'ez: ጾም, ṣōm) periods, including Wednesdays, Fridays, and the entire Lenten season; so Habesha cuisine contains many dishes that are vegan.

Dress

Classical texts like the Periplus show that the Aksumite Empire imported finished cotton and Indian textiles while exchanging its own raw materials like ivory, tortoiseshell, and hides across the Red Sea and into the Mediterranean. According to the 6th-century Byzantine ambassadors, Aksumite rulers wore linen tunics and complex drapery over the shoulders.

According to Leo Africanus, a greater number of the Abyssinians historically wore handwoven cotton garments, with the more honourable wearing the hides of lions, tigers and ounces. Duarte Barbosa also attests that their clothes being of hides as the country was in wanting of clothes. Pedro Paez, a Spanish Jesuit who resided in Ethiopia, described that the peasant women wore skins like their husbands and, in some areas, some woollen cloths five or six cubits long and three wide that they call " mahâc ", and they could quite fairly call it haircloth because it is much rougher than what Capuchin monks wear, as in Ethiopia they do not know how to make cloth, and the wool is not suitable for it as it is very coarse. They all go barefoot and often naked from the breasts up, with tiny glass beads of various colours strung so as to make a band two fingers in breadth around their necks.

Clothing is a diverse tapestry of highland and urban traditions. For the Amhara, Tigray and Tigrinya peoples, this tradition centers around white, handwoven cotton dress. However, this identity also encompasses the distinct style of the Gurage people whose attire departs from white cotton in favor of brocade dresses.

The netela is a handmade cloth many Ethiopian women use to cover their head and shoulders when they wear clothing made out of chiffon, especially when attending church. It is made up of two layers of fabric, unlike gabi, which is made out of four. Kuta is the male version.

An Ethiopian or Eritrean suit is the traditional formal wear of Habesha men. It consists of a long sleeve, knee-length shirt, and matching pants. Most shirts are made with a Mandarin, band, or Nehru collar. The suit is made of chiffon, which is a sheer silk or rayon cloth. The netela shawl or a kuta is wrapped around the suit.

== Religion ==
=== Christianity ===
The empire centered in Aksum and Adwa was part of the world in which Christianity grew. The arrival of Christianity in Northern Ethiopia and Eritrea happened around the 4th century. The Aksumites, in fact, had been converted to Christianity hundreds of years before most of Europe. Many of their churches were cut into cliffs or from single blocks of stone, as they were in Turkey and in parts of Greece, where Christianity had existed from its earliest years. The church is a central feature of communities and of each family's daily life. Each community has a church with a patron saint.

Ethiopia has often been mentioned in the Bible. A well-known example of this is the story of the Ethiopian eunuch as written in Acts (8: 27): "Then the angel of the Lord said to Philip, Start out and go south to the road that leads down from Jerusalem to Gaza. So he set out and was on his way when he caught sight of an Ethiopian. This man was a eunuch, a high official of the Kandake (Candace) Queen of Ethiopia in charge of all her treasure." The passage continues by describing how Philip helped the Ethiopian understand one passage of Isaiah that the Ethiopian was reading. After the Ethiopian received an explanation of the passage, he requested that Philip baptize him, which Philip obliged. Queen Gersamot Hendeke VII (very similar to Kandake) was the Queen of Ethiopia from the year 42 to 52. The Ethiopian Orthodox Tewahedo Church was founded in the 4th century by Syrian monks. Historically, the Ethiopian Orthodox Tewahedo Church and Eritrean Orthodox Tewahedo Church have had strong ties with the Coptic Orthodox Church of Alexandria, the Coptic Orthodox Church of Alexandria appointing the archbishop for the Eritrean Orthodox Tewahedo Church. They gained independence from the Coptic Orthodox Church of Alexandria in the 1950s, although the Eritrean Orthodox Tewahedo Church has recently reforged the link.

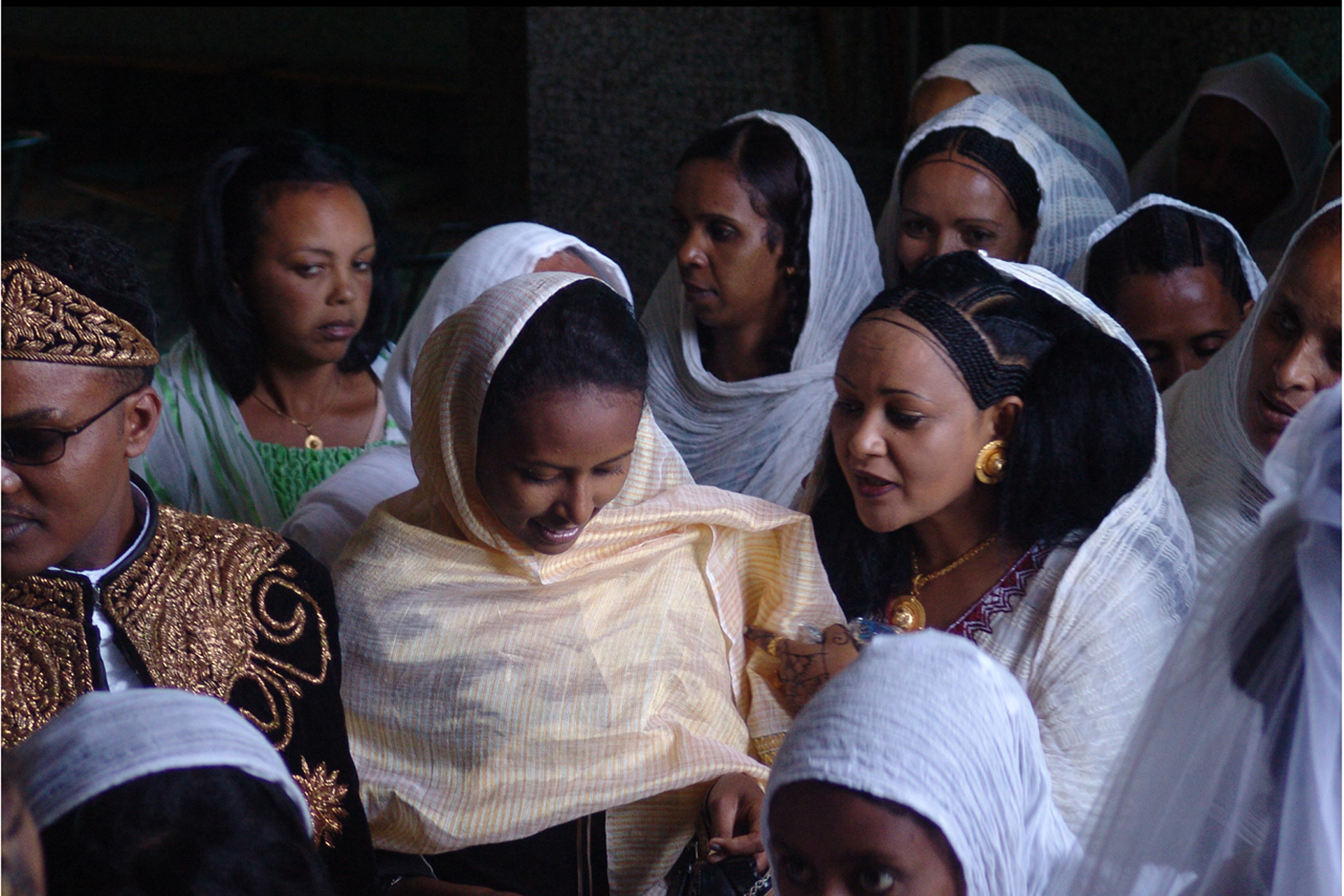
A traditional Tigrinya wedding.

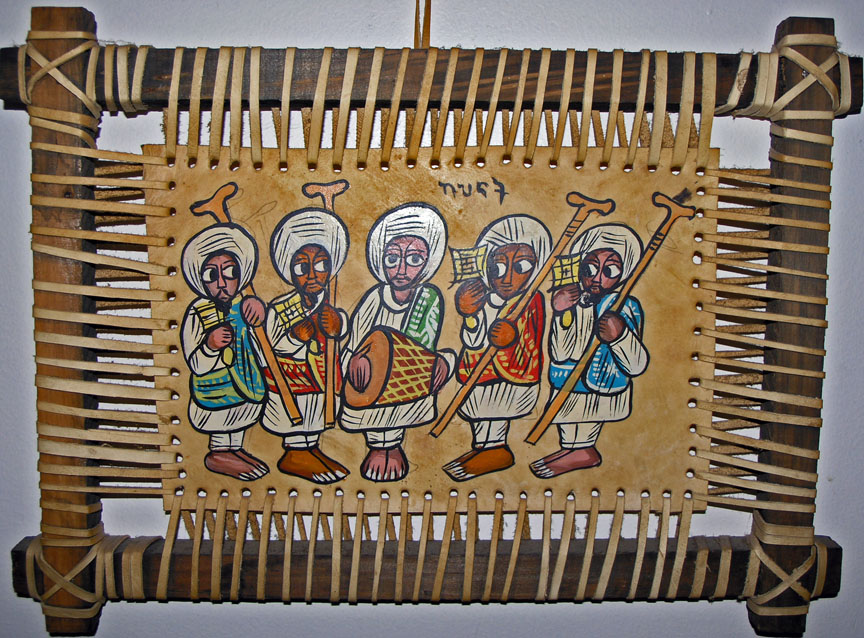
This leather painting depicts Ethiopian Orthodox priests playing sistra and a drum

A number of unique beliefs and practices distinguish Ethiopian Orthodox Christianity from other Christian groups; for example, the Ark of the Covenant is very important. Every Ethiopian church has a replica of the Ark. Also, the Ethiopian Church has a larger biblical canon than other churches.

Church services are conducted in Ge´ez, the ancient language of Ethiopia and Eritrea. Ge´ez is no longer a living language, its use now confined to liturgical contexts, occupying a similar place in Eritrean and Ethiopian church life to Latin in the Roman Catholic Church.

Other Ethiopian and Eritrean Orthodox practices include such things as fasting, prescribed prayers, and devotion to saints and angels. A child is never left alone until baptism and cleansing rituals are performed. Boys are baptized forty days after birth, whereas girls are baptized eighty days after birth.

Defrocked priests and deacons commonly function as diviners, who are the main healers. Spirit possession is common, affecting primarily women. Women are also the normal spirit mediums. A debtera is an itinerant lay priest figure trained by the Church as a scribe, cantor, and often as a folk healer, who may also function in roles comparable to a deacon or exorcist. Folklore and legends ascribe the role of magician to the debtera as well.

A small number of Abyssinian Christians adhere to various forms of Pentecostalism or Anabaptism, collectively known as P'ent'ay.

==== Similarities to Judaism and Islam ====
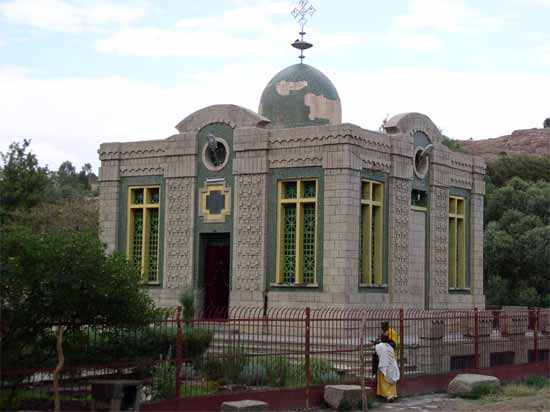
The Chapel of the Tablet at the Church of Our Lady Mary of Zion is believed to house the original Ark of the Covenant.

The Ethiopian church places a heavier emphasis on Old Testament teachings than one might find in the Roman Catholic or Protestant churches, and its followers adhere to certain practices that one finds in Orthodox or Conservative Judaism. Ethiopian Christians, like some other Eastern Christians, traditionally follow dietary rules that are similar to Jewish Kashrut, specifically with regard to how an animal is slaughtered. Similarly, pork is prohibited, though unlike Kashrut, Ethiopian cuisine does mix dairy products with meat- which in turn makes it even closer to Islamic dietary laws (see Halal). Women are prohibited from entering the church during their menses; they are also expected to cover their hair with a large scarf (or shash) while in church in keeping with 1 Corinthians 11. As with Orthodox synagogues, men and women are seated separately in the Ethiopian church, with men on the left and women on the right (when facing the altar). However, women covering their heads and separation of the sexes in the Church building officially is common to many Oriental Orthodox, Eastern Orthodox and Catholic Christians and not unique to Judaism. Ethiopian Orthodox worshippers remove their shoes when entering a church, in accordance with Exodus 3:5 (in which Moses, while viewing the burning bush, is commanded to remove his shoes while standing on holy ground). Furthermore, both the Sabbath (Saturday), and the Lord's Day (Sunday) are observed as holy, although more emphasis, because of the Resurrection of Jesus Christ, is laid upon the Holy Sunday.

=== Islam ===
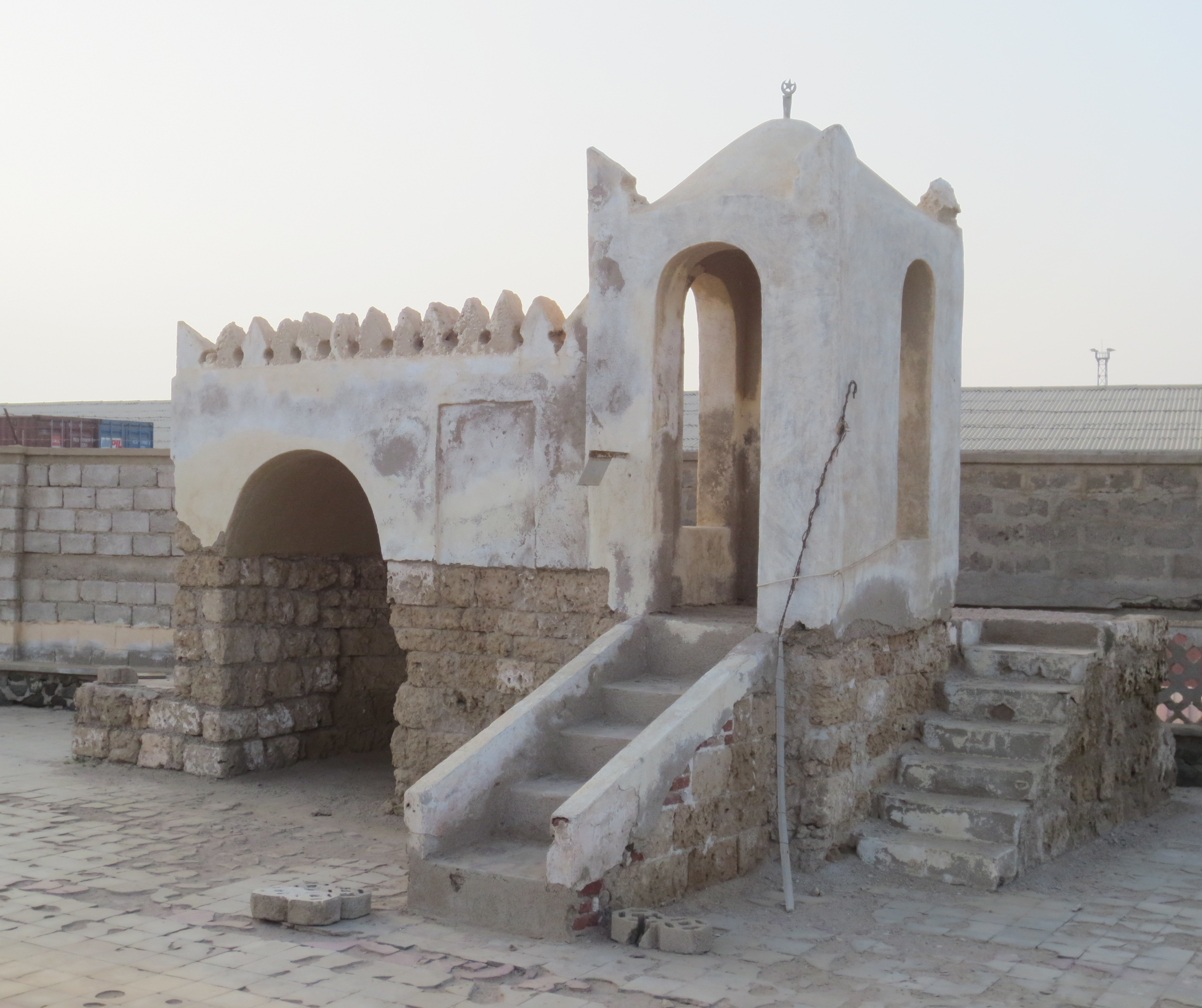
The Mosque of the Companions in Massawa, reportedly Africa's oldest mosque, built by Muhammad's companions in 615 C.E.

Islam in Ethiopia and Eritrea dates to 615. During that year, a group of Muslims were counseled by Muhammad to escape persecution in Mecca and migrate to Abyssinia, which was ruled by, in Muhammad's estimation, a pious Christian king (al-najashi). Muhammad's followers crossed the Red Sea and sought refuge in the Kingdom of Aksum, possibly settling at Negash, a place in present-day Tigray Region. Moreover, Islamic tradition states that Bilal, one of the foremost companions of Muhammad, was from Abyssinia, as were many non-Arab Companions of Muhammad; in fact, Abyssinians were the single largest non-Arab ethnic group who were Muhammad's companions. Among these was Umm Ayman who cared for Muhammad during his infancy, a woman that he referred to as "mother". Abyssinia was thus the earliest home outside of Arabia for the dispersal of the Islamic world faith. One third (34%) of Ethiopia's population are Muslims by last census (2007).

Most of Ethiopia and Eritrea's Muslims are Sunni Muslims, much like the majority of the Muslim world, hence the beliefs and practices of the Muslims of Ethiopia and Eritrea are basically the same: embodied in the Qur'an and the Sunnah. There are also Sufi orders present in Ethiopia. According to the 1994 census of Ethiopia (with similar numbers for the 1984 census), about a third of its population is adherent of Islam and members of the Muslim community can be found throughout the country. Islam in Ethiopia is the predominant religion in the regions of Somali, Afar, Berta, and the section of Oromia east of the Great Rift Valley, as well as in Jimma. Islam in Eritrea is the predominant religion of all the ethnic groups except for the Tigrinya people, the Bilen people, and the Kunama people.

The most important Islamic religious practices, such as the daily ritual prayers (ṣalāt) and fasting (Arabic: صوم ṣawm, Ethiopic ጾም, ṣom – used by local Christians as well) during the holy month of Ramadan, are observed both in urban centers as well as in rural areas, among both settled peoples and nomads. Numerous Ethiopian Muslims perform the pilgrimage to Mecca every year.

Ethiopian Gurage: Celebrity singer Mahmoud Ahmed.

=== Judaism ===
Judaism in Ethiopia is believed to date from very ancient times. Precisely what its early history was, however, remains obscure. The now dominant Ethiopian Orthodox Tewahedo Church claims it originated from the visit of the Queen of Sheba to King Solomon back in the 10th century BCE. This visit is mentioned in the Hebrew Scriptures (I Kings 10:1), Sheba was a kingdom that stretched from Ethiopia to the south of the Yemen. Yemen is very close to Ethiopia across the Red Sea, and it has been recorded that modern Ethiopia has been heavily influenced by the ancient Sabean kingdom. Moreover, the details of the queen's visit, including the alleged theft of the Holy Ark as well as Solomon getting her pregnant with a child who established the "Solomonic" lineage in Ethiopia, as given in Christian Ethiopian tradition, were written in the Kebra Nagast the Ethiopian chronicle of its early history. The oldest known existing copies of the book date from as far back as the 13th century. Jewish Ethiopians are mentioned in both the Torah (the first five books of the Old Testament) as well as the Christian New Testament. It is clear that the Jewish presence in Ethiopia dates back at least 2,500 years.

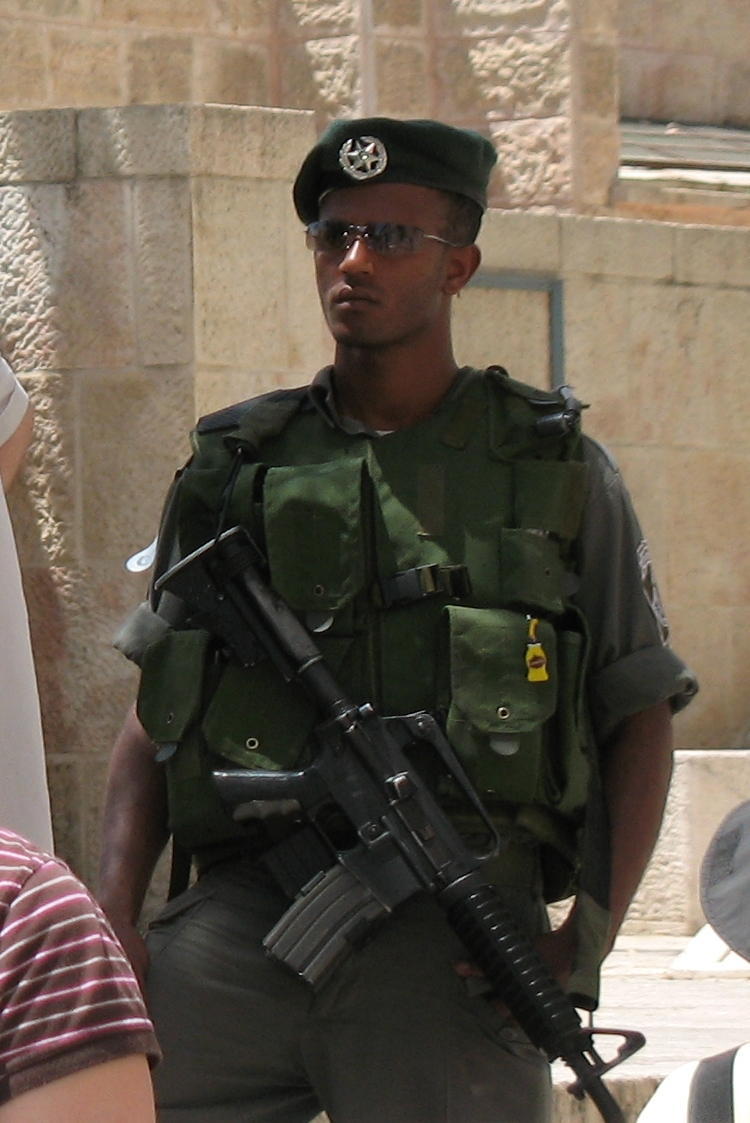
An Ethiopian Jewish Israeli Border Policeman

The Jewish Pre-settlement Theory essentially states that starting around the 8th century BCE until about the 5th century BCE, there was an influx of Jewish settlers both from Egypt & Sudan in the north, and southern Arabia in the east.

The chief Semitic languages of Ethiopia also suggest an antiquity of Judaism in Ethiopia. "There still remains the curious circumstance that a number of Abyssinian words connected with religion – Hell, idol, Easter, purification, alms – are of Hebrew origin. These words must have been derived directly from a Jewish source, for the Abyssinian Church knows the scriptures only in a Ge'ez version made from the Septuagint."

Beta Israel traditions claim that the Ethiopian Jews are descended from the lineage of Moses himself, some of whose children and relatives are said to have separated from the other Children of Israel after the Exodus and gone southwards, or, alternatively or together with this, that they are descended from the tribe of Dan, which fled southwards down the Arabian coastal lands from Judaea at the time of the breakup of the Kingdom of Israel into two kingdoms in the 10th century BCE. (precipitated by the oppressive demands of Rehoboam, King Solomon's heir), or at the time of the destruction of the northern kingdom of Israel in the 8th century BCE. Certainly there was trade as early as the time of King Solomon down along the Red Sea to the Yemen and even as far as India, according to the Bible, and there would, therefore, have been Jewish settlements at various points along the trade routes. There is definite archaeological evidence of Jewish settlements and of their cultural influence on both sides of the Red Sea well at least 2,500 years ago, both along the Arabian coast and in the Yemen, on the eastern side, and along the southern Egyptian and Sudanese coastal regions. Modern day Ethiopian Jews are adherents of Haymanot, a sect that is close to Karaite Judaism.

Some Ethiopian Jews, especially those living in Israel, follow mainstream Judaism, mainly due to the Israeli government making 'proper conversion' a prerequisite for being recognized as Jews.

== See also ==
- Naming conventions in Ethiopia and Eritrea

== Notes ==
The source texts, RIE 185 and 189, are unvocalized. These vocalizations are from Rainer Voigt and Francis Breyer.
