= Clothing in Africa =

Traditional clothing and fashion of Africa

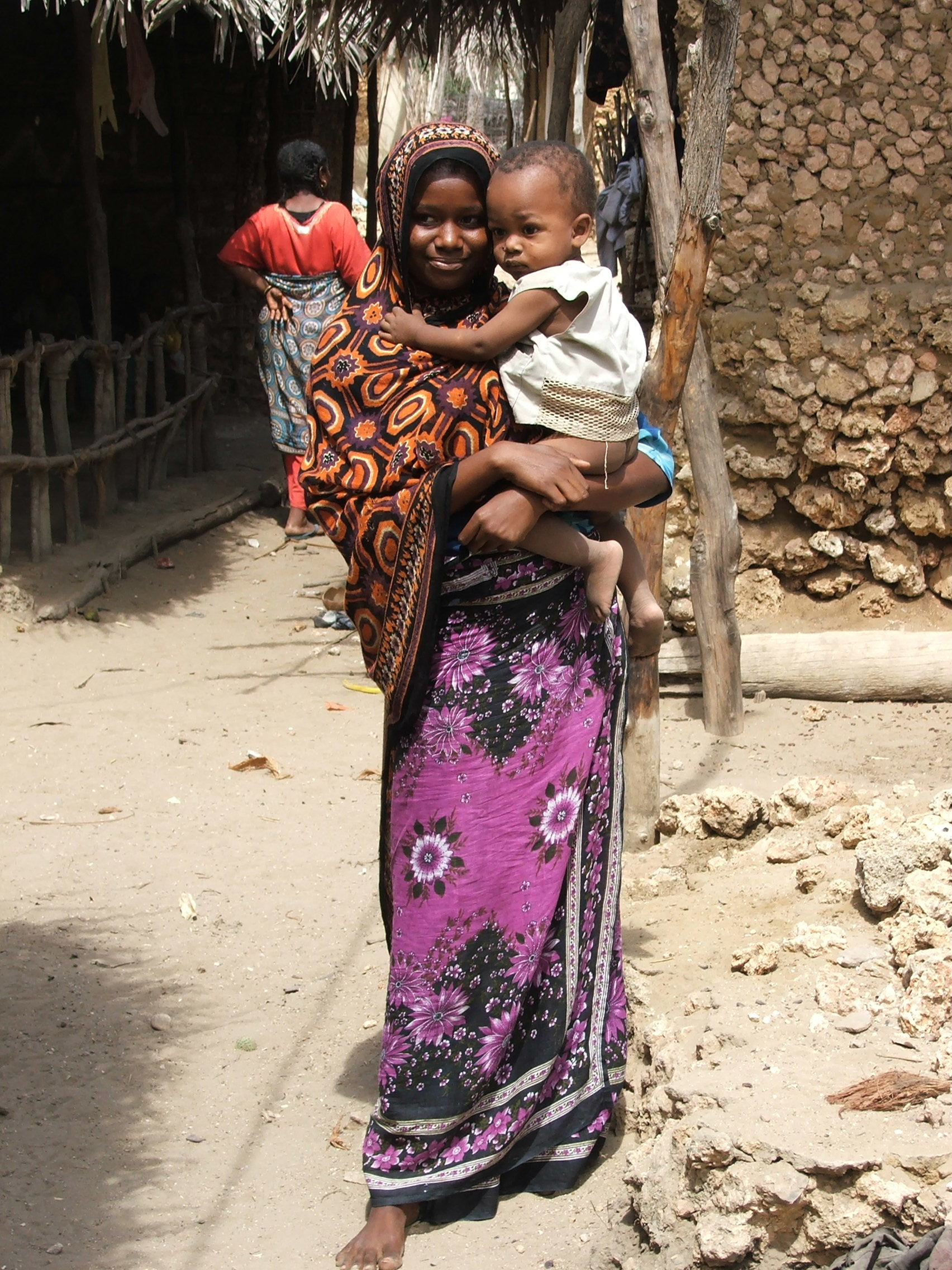
A woman in Kenya wearing kanga

African clothing is the traditional clothing worn by the people of Africa.

African clothing and fashion is a diverse topic that provides a look into different African cultures. Clothing varies from brightly colored textiles, to abstractly embroidered robes, to colorful beaded bracelets and necklaces. Since Africa is such a large and diverse continent, traditional clothing differs throughout each country. For example, many countries in West Africa have a "distinct regional dress styles that are the products of long-standing textile crafts in weaving, dyeing, and printing", but these traditions are still able to coexist with western styles. A large contrast in African fashion is between rural and urban societies. Urban societies typically are exposed more to trade and the changing world, while it takes more time for new western trends to get to rural areas.

== By region ==
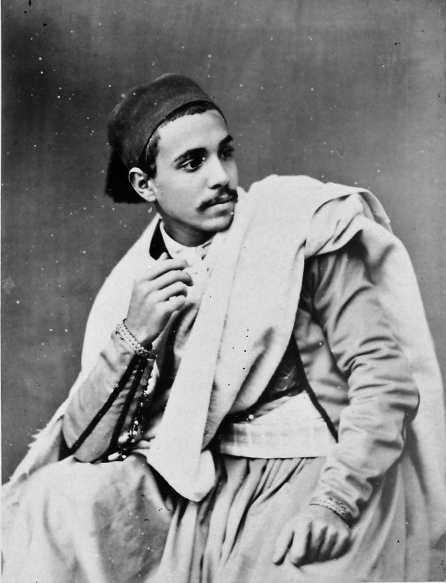
Urban Algerian man wearing a burnous (woolen cloth)

In Northeastern Africa, particularly in Egypt, styles of traditional women's clothing have been influenced by Middle Eastern cultures; this can be exemplified by the simply embroidered jelabiya which are similarly worn in Arab states of the Persian Gulf. The djellaba (worn in Northwest Africa) shares similar properties with the boubou, the dashiki, and the Senegalese kaftan. While in Nigeria, women wear various clothing including styles made from Ankara, Asooke and Gele.

In Sahelian Africa, the dashiki, Senegalese kaftan, and the grand boubou made from Bazin material are worn more prominently, though not exclusively (the Bògòlanfini, for instance, is worn in Mali). The dashiki is highly stylized and is rendered with an ornate V-shaped collar. In contrast the grand boubou is simpler, even more so than the djellaba, though the color designs reach impressive proportions, especially among the Tuareg, who are known for their dyed indigo robes.

In East Africa, the kanzu is the traditional dress worn by Swahili-speaking men. Women wear the kanga and the gomesi.

In Southern Africa, distinctive shirts are worn, like the long dresses they wear. For instance, the Republic of South Africa is known for the Madiba shirt, whereas Zimbabwe is known for the safari shirt.

In the Horn of Africa, the attire varies by country. In Ethiopia, men wear the Ethiopian suit and women wear the habesha kemis. In Somalia, men wear the khamis with a small cap called a koofiyad. The Zuria, is a common traditional dress worn in Eritrea.

== Fashion in South Africa ==
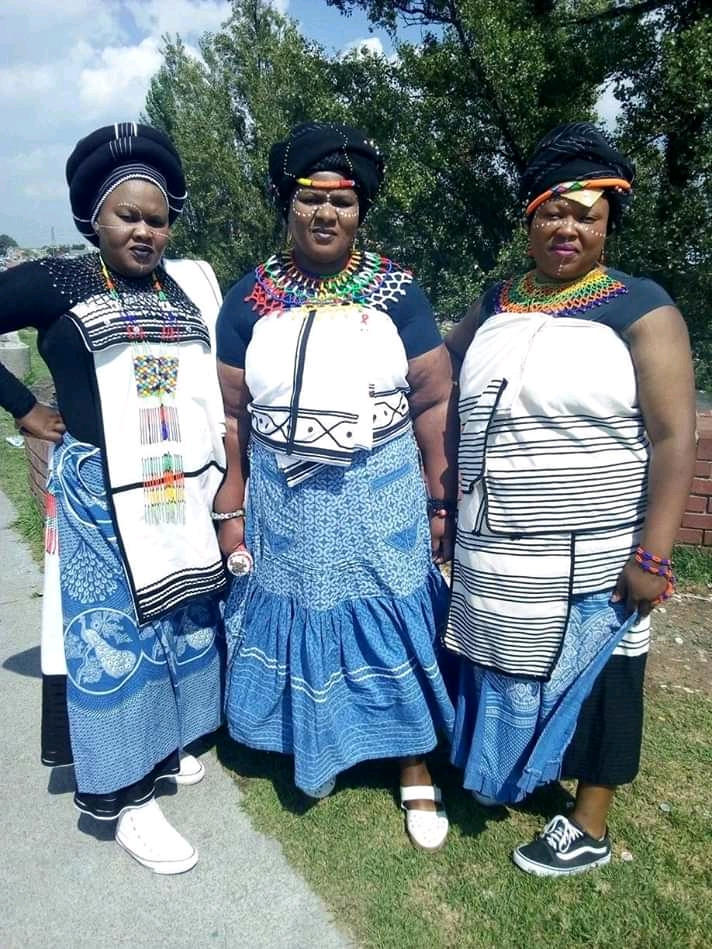
Xhosa women

The Republic of South Africa is populated by an estimated 57 million people from many different backgrounds, ethnicities and religions. Fashion is influenced by the daily lives of the population and varies across these groups, with clothing styles chosen out of personal expression, religious beliefs, social status, convenience, and so on.

=== Precolonial ===
One of the earliest vestiges of South African attire was traced back to around 2000 years ago when Middle Paleolithic population descendants, the Khoisan, settled in Cape Peninsula in the south-western extremity of the African continent. These people were divided into two groups: the hunter-gatherers San and the pastoral herders Khoikoi. Without foreign contact, garments and cloth were unavailable for them to import. Instead, these early settlers altered available resources such as game and domestic animals' softened skin, and sometimes, plants and ostrich eggshell for attire making. In addition to these sources, the introduction of metal also gave them more choices for fashion.

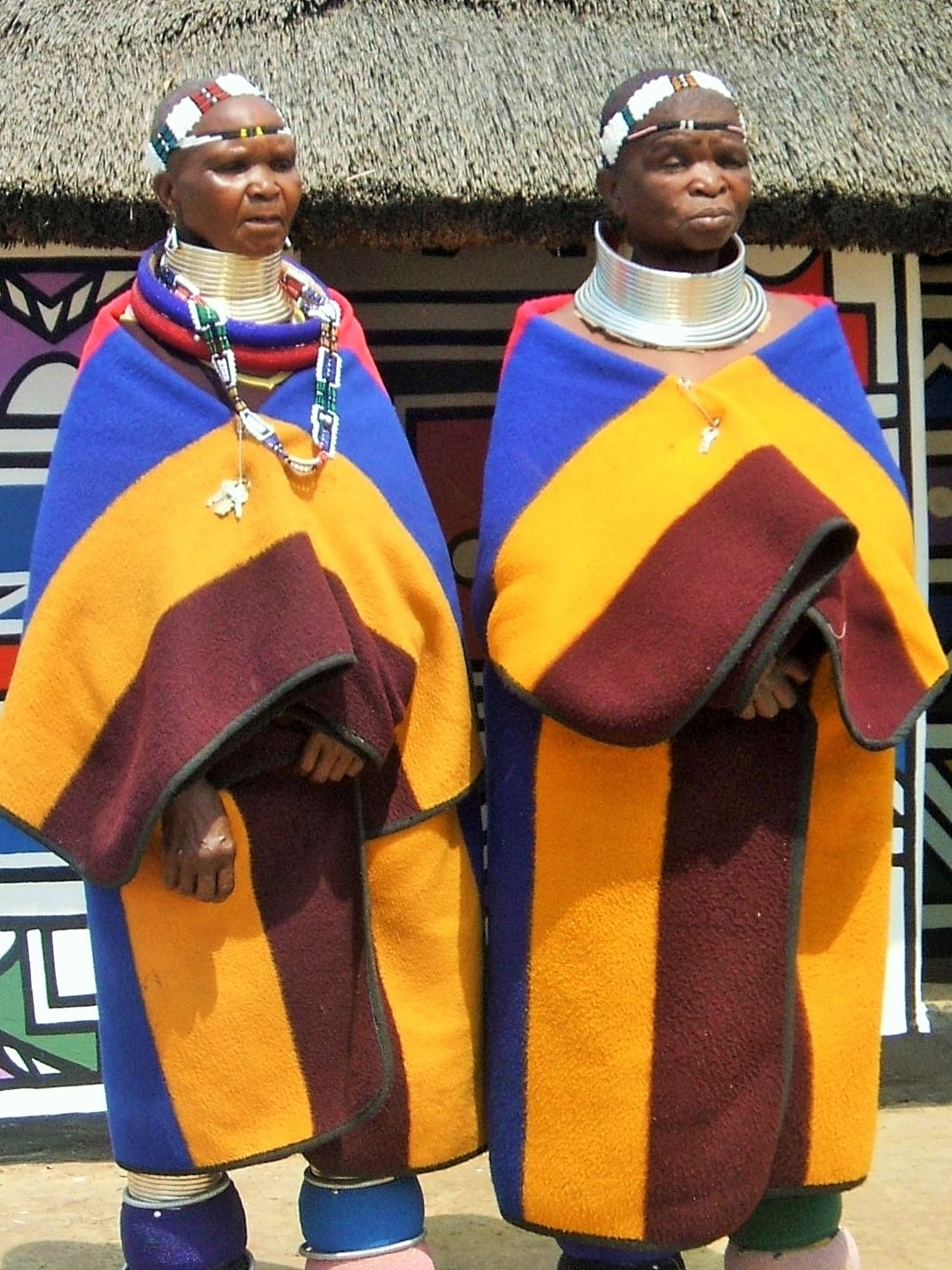
Colorful Ndebele traditional clothing

The arrival of the Khoisan people were followed shortly after by groups of Bantu peoples, who, through the Bantu expansion, ended up with conflict and occupied the land of the Khoisan people, forcing them into dispersion and absorption into the Bantu-speaking community. The settlement of Bantu-speaking peoples of South Africa resulted in the formation of the Kingdom of Mapungubwe, from 900 to 1300 A.D., that flourished with trades from other foreign regions for gold and ivory in the exchange of clothes, glass bead and Chinese porcelain. Bantu-speaking inhabitants in South Africa also lead to the derivation of modern main groups of people in South Africa, which are the Nguni speaking people, comprising four smaller groups: Zulu, Xhosa, Swazi, Ndebele. The other groups of people in South Africa are the Sotho-Tswana peoples (Tswana, Pedi, and Sotho), while the group of people in the north-eastern areas of present-day South Africa are Venda, Lemba, and Tsonga. All of these groups of people, share the common home of South Africa, have for themselves distinctive languages and culture.

=== Colonial ===
Colonization starting from the mid seventeenth century undoubtedly changed South Africa in all aspects, and fashion together all those changes was influenced heavily by the arrival of new materials from Europe as well as the Eurocentric view about the body and clothing, perceiving that South Africans dressed like necked imposed changes on traditional fashion of these indigenous groups of people. Traditional clothing made with local materials were incorporated with new style and items from Europe. In the early nineteenth century, glass beads and plastic beads from Europe added new materials to the traditional collection of materials that South African indigenous people used to make beadworks.

Around the late nineteenth century, Isishweshwe fabric was introduced to South Africa through importation from England and Germany. The cloth was made with indigo dye and later, with a synthetic form of indigo dye with a range of colors ranging from blue and red to maroon and brown, associated with decorations from replicated and orderly organized geometric patterns. Isishweshwe slowly blended itself to the fashion world of South African people, appearing on clothing of working-class people, rural women and male soldiers. Though popular, because it was imported from other countries, it was not recognized as unique to African fashion until 1982 when a South African company, Da Gama Textiles, began producing the cloths helping make it be considered a representative fabric of South Africa. With the influence of colonizers, Western fashion came to rule over South Africa with educated class people preferring Edwardian top coats and hats. Working men also went with Western style that boost the demand for these products. Stores in these working areas carried a wide variety of goods such as boots, coats, tweed jackets, waistcoats, shirts, braces, belts, hats, handkerchiefs, and pocket watches.

=== Apartheid period ===
During this era of classifying people by their ethnicities and races, unique dress of each South African indigenous community served to make that community distinct. However, besides that, wearing traditional dress also acted as a way for South African coloured people to express their resistance and displeasure with the government ruled by a minority of white people. Traditional clothes were worn by leaders such as Nelson Mandela, who put on a Xhosa traditional garment, in 1962 in his trial for attempting to overthrow the government. The expression of his identity as a true South African person spoke for the aggression in resistance and asking for one's won control of one's country. While traditional dresses were worn as part of expressing one's identity, South African fashion in the apartheid period witnessed the continuing growth of influence from European fashion. Pre-apartheid fashion in South Africa depended heavily on European fashion import whereas post-apartheid fashion celebrated one's ethnicity through many South African designers bringing a touch of Africa to European style clothing. One noticeable example is Marianne Fassler who incorporated leopard-print with clothing in European style. She took inspiration from South African sources from clothing of indigenous groups of people to artists such as Barbara Tyrrell and Marlene Dumas.

=== Post-apartheid ===
After the apartheid period ended in 1994, South African traditional dresses continued to be a way to express pride in one's nation and identity as well as an enormous source of inspiration for famous fashion brands such as Sun Goddess, Stoned Cherrie and Strangelove. Pieces such as head wraps and A-line skirt inspired by Xhosa people from the nineteenth century were brought back on the runway. South African fashion is a mix between African people themselves and foreigners they interacted with. For its diversity, no single style of dress is stated as national dress, but rather each group of people has a distinctive way to dress themselves.

=== Developing fashion industry ===
As of 2016, there has been a boom in the development shops, clothing boutiques, hotels, as well as major restaurants in Accra, Ghana. As time passed there has been more recognition for the development of art through the creation of fashion in countries such as Kenya, Morocco, Nigeria, and South Africa. While there is a global disconnect between the western world and their interpretation of African fashion through the use of tribal patterns, many designers have risen and made an impact on the high-end fashion industry by putting a twist on their traditional African garments. New designers are now trying to expand their entrepreneurial footprint and enlighten the world on the versatility of African fashion. More specifically Johannesburg's development in making an impact on the fashion industry has been more intentional. With the help of many designers, Johannesburg has built up a fashion district in the inner city that has made a name for itself globally. While new designers use this location as a stepping stone for their expansion, established fashion houses also play a role in the maturing of the district. Conversion of the established and developing fashion houses has built international respect for South Africa with the fashion industry, making South Africa's Fashion Week a major destination in the worldwide fashion takeover at the beginning of each spring/summer and fall/winter season. Due to the city's plethora of established black-owned talent, Johannesburg has become one of the major fashion capitals for not only black creatives, but designers of all races.

== Western clothing ==
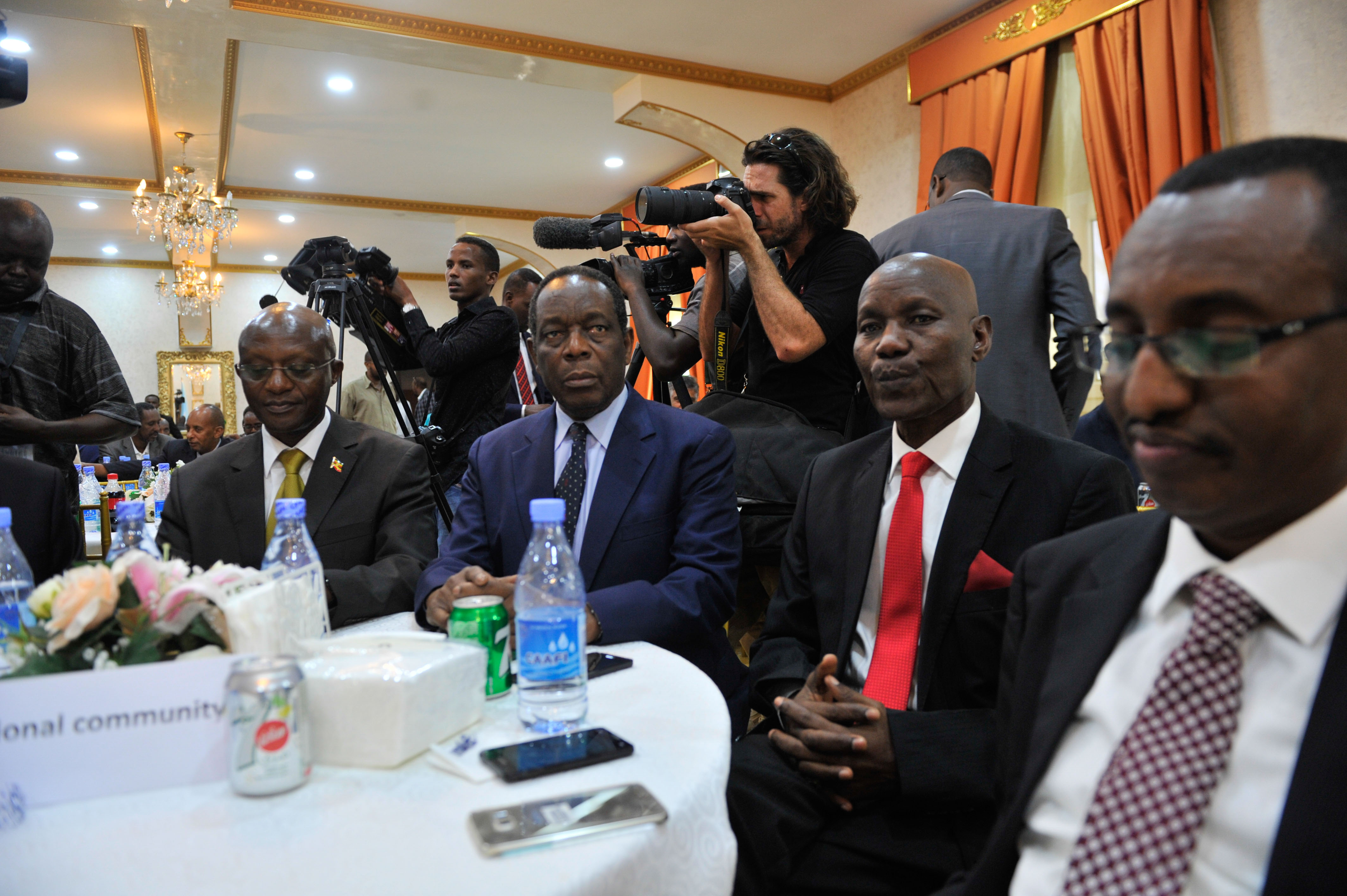
African formal clothing has normalized western clothing conventions and styles

European influence is commonly found in African fashion as well. For example, Ugandan men have started to wear "full length trousers and long-sleeved shirts". On the other hand, women have started to adapt influences from "19th-century Victorian dress". These styles include: "long sleeves and puffed shoulders, a full skirt, and commonly a colorful bow tied around the waist". This style of dress is called a busuti. Another popular trend is to pair a piece of modern western clothing, such as T-shirts with traditional wraps. Communities have also started to incorporate secondhand western clothing into their everyday style. With the globalization of western clothing influence from urban to rural areas, it has now become more common to find people wearing a variety of styles of clothes.

=== Secondhand clothing ===
There exist non-profit organizations in all western societies that sell used clothes to for-profit companies in Africa. These European clothes are quite common in some parts of the continent. These used clothing are called Mitumba in some areas and are surrounded by controversy. Critics point to it as a threat to local clothing manufacturers and complain that it exploits consumers while others like the average Nigerian citizen argue that these used clothing items provide useful competition for often expensive and low quality local products.

Before charitable organizations started importing used clothes, cheap cotton clothing from Asia was the biggest import of cotton clothing to Africa. Thereafter, western charitable organizations began to send used clothing to African refugees and the poor. Countries in sub-Saharan Africa are one of the top destinations for the import of used clothing. Although used clothing was commonly sent for the lower class communities, it is now commonly found within other social classes in Africa. Secondhand clothing is found in everyday apparel for many people, regardless of their class difference. This is because there was always a variety of clothing and it was a good price. However, typically in Muslim regions, such as North Africa, do not partake in this trade due to religious reasons. Instead, Islamic African men wear a long flowing robe and women wear hijab along with a dress covering all skin.

Although these clothes are often donated by organizations in belief that people in rural and poor areas will be obtaining them first, the people who live in the cities get the clothing first. Since urban areas are full of fast and changing lifestyles, they are able to adapt to the change in cultures, such as change in tradition dress. These foreign clothes often are drastically different than what people are used to in more rural parts of Africa. People may believe that they are being insulted by being given something that they believe to be old, tattered and dirty. Generally, it seems that most countries have adapted to the use of secondhand clothing and have used it to their advantage.

==== Impacts ====
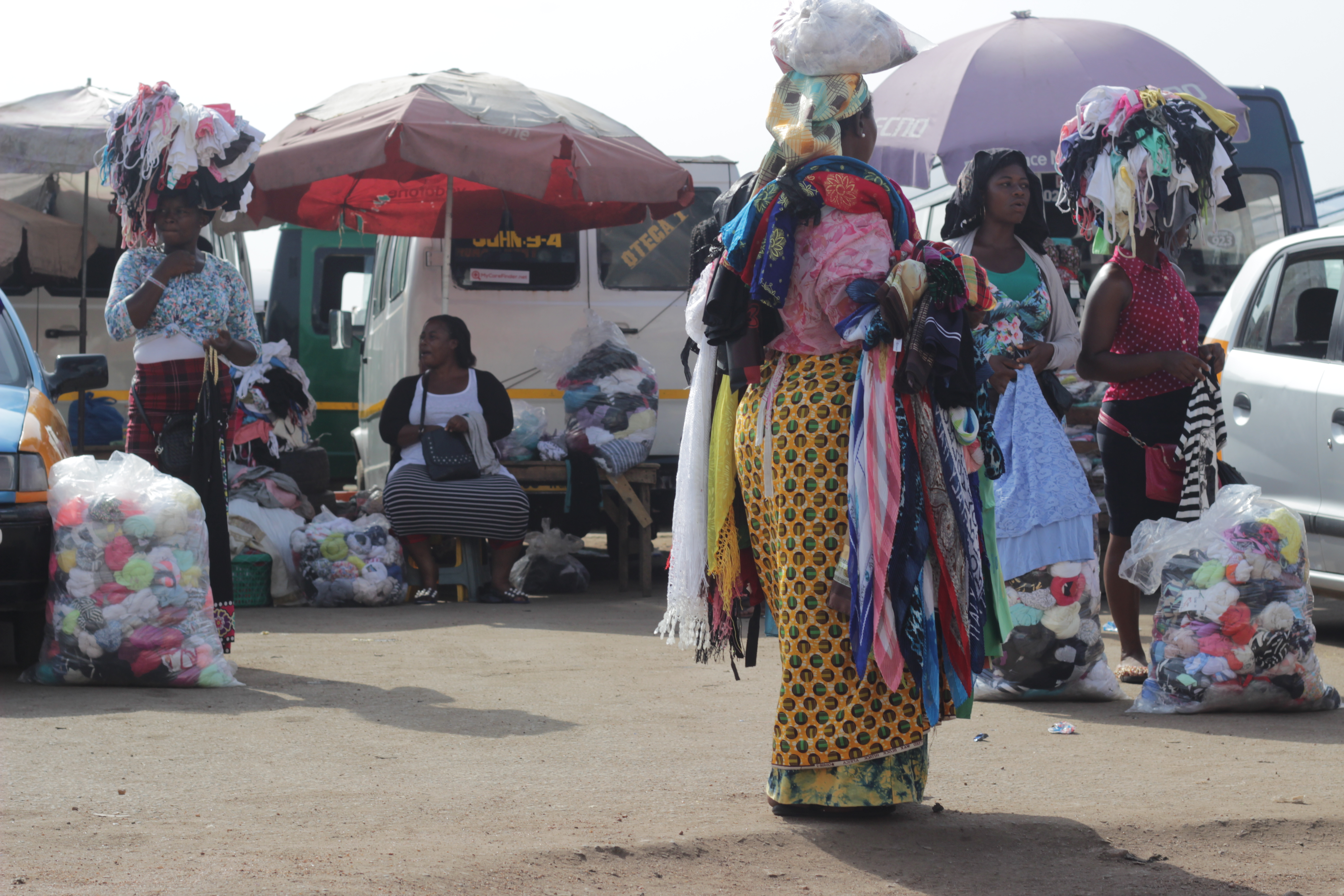
Secondhand clothing market in Ghana

The second hand clothing industry has left both positive and negative impacts within African society. An impact that one would commonly not think of is the resale of imported western clothing. South Africa, among other nations, has created legislation of imported or donated goods in order to curb the resale of the donated items. Côte d'Ivoire, Nigeria, Kenya and Malawi had to completely ban the importation/donation of second hand clothes in order to try to control the resale. Another negative impact commonly argued is that the importation of western clothing leaves a negative impact on local clothing producers. However, the opposite side of the argument believes that the high importation creates new jobs for the people living in the port cities. These jobs include the sorting, washing, re-tailoring and transporting of the clothes to the markets.

Another impact that could be argued either negatively or positively, is that secondhand clothing has become more common to wear than classic African textiles. In Zambia, where it is known as salaula, secondhand clothing has basically become a new type of traditional clothing. Zambian cities are full of used clothing markets, which are extremely successful. Since Zambians have been wearing more western clothes, traditional textiles and crafts have seemed to become scarce. While Senegal and Nigeria prefer to "follow long-standing regional style conventions, dressing with pride for purposes of displaying locally produced cloth in "African" styles". It can be argued that Zambia is losing a piece of its culture by wearing only western styles or even that people in Senegal and Nigeria are not open minded enough to try to incorporate western styles into their fashion. These differences in beliefs in used clothing help make African fashion a diverse topic.

== Sustainable textile practices ==
=== Natural dyeing techniques ===
African textile production, specifically in West Africa, has a long history of using natural dyes. The most common natural dye is Indigo which is sourced from plants. This practice is most common in the Yoruba tribe in Southern Nigeria. There is a Yoruba textile tradition called adire. Adire uses specific dyeing techniques that involve barriers to create patterns typically on cotton fabric. Traditional methods include using household materials like raffia and cassava starch to act as blockers for the dye. The selective and intricate placing of cassava starch, raffia and dye all together create beautiful patterns. These methods still remain part of the production process today.

== See also ==
- African textiles
- National costume
- 1990s in African fashion
- 2000s in African fashion
- 2010s in African fashion
- Bogart Man
