= Taqiyah (cap) =

Short rounded skullcap worn by some Muslims

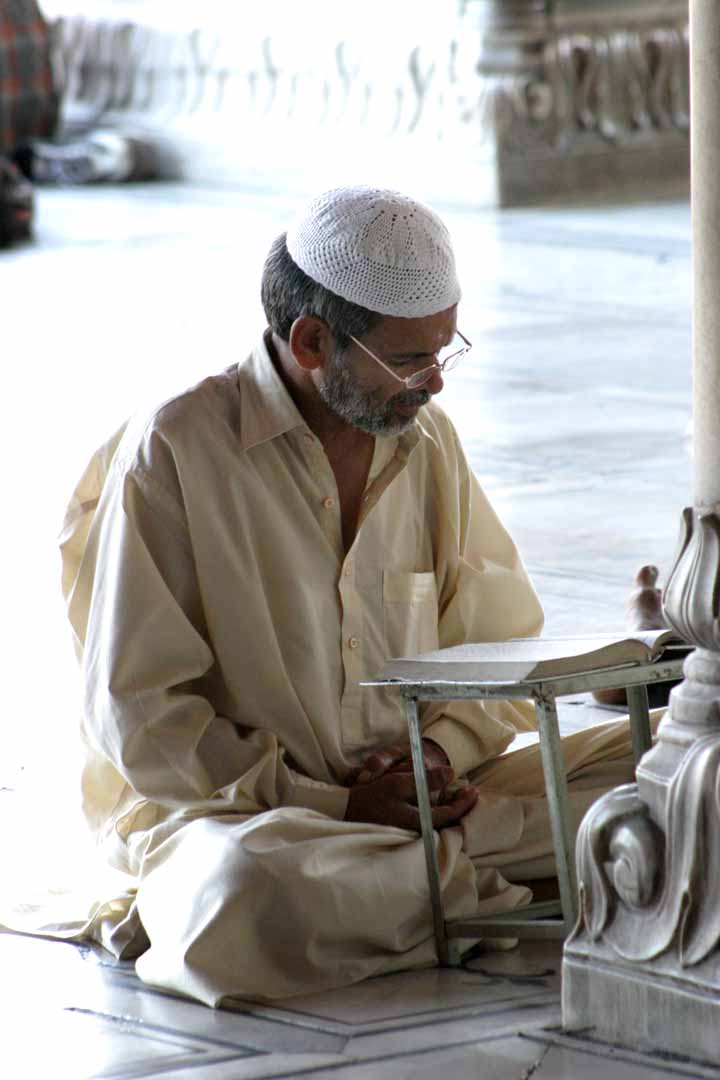
A man wearing a crochet taqiyah and dressed in a kurta

The Taqiyah (Arabic: طاقية, ALA-LC: ṭāqīyah (Note: Turkish: "takke", Urdu, Hindi "topi", टोपी ٹوپی, ALA-LC: "ṭopī", Bengali: টুপি, ṭupi, Somali: "Koofi"))), also known as tagiyah or araqchin (Persian: عرقچین; Turkish: takke), is a short, rounded skullcap worn by Muslim men. In the United States and the United Kingdom, it is also referred to as a "kufi", although the kufi typically has more of an African connotation while the taqiyah has a more universal connotation. Aside from being an adornment, the taqiyah has deeply ingrained significance in Islamic culture, reflecting the wearer's faith, devotion, and sometimes regional identity. While the taqiyah is deeply rooted in Muslim traditions, its use varies based on cultural context rather than strict religious guidelines.

According to medieval Egyptian historian al-Maqrizi, the taqiyah was popular in the Mamluk dynasty, where common men, soldiers, princes, and officials wore them. This was a custom inherited from their predecessor, the Ayyubid dynasty. In Arab states of the Persian Gulf, with the exception of Oman, the taqiyah is commonly worn under a ghutra. In Turkmenistan, taqiyahs are called tahýa in the Turkmen language and are a Turkmen national headdress with embroidered national patterns. In the fashion industry, taqiyah caps have become a component in orientalist fashion shows.

== Etymology ==
Taqiyah is the Arabic word for a Muslim skullcap. In the Indian subcontinent, it is called a topi (Bengali: টুপি, Hindi: टोपी, Urdu: ٹوپی) which means hat or cap in general. In Bangladesh, Pakistan, India, and men usually wear the topi with kurta and paijama. In the United States and United Kingdom, many Muslim merchants sell the prayer cap under the name kufi. The Bukharan Jews adopted their distinctive style of kippah from the kufi.

== Muslim world ==
There are a wide variety of Muslim caps worn around the world. Each country or region usually has a unique head covering.

=== By country ===
==== Afghanistan ====
In Afghanistan, men wear all sorts of araqchin, with different designs depending on the wearer's ethnicity, village and affiliations. They often wrap a turban around it, which is usually white, but black and other colors are also widely seen. They wear their araqchins with a peran tomban or perahan wa tonban, which means 'shirt and trousers' in the Dari language, which corresponds to a different, more archaic version of the shalwar kameez, being collarless, and of a wider cut. Traditionally, the shirts sport distinctive embroidery, sometimes golden. But due to war, the traditional peran tomban is less and less used, and the shalwar kameez with a collar is becoming more and more used, specially by Eastern Afghans, and people coming from poor backgrounds.

==== Maldives ====
The prayer cap is called thakiha. The cap is known as the thofi and the fisherman's cap is referred to as koari.

==== Bangladesh ====
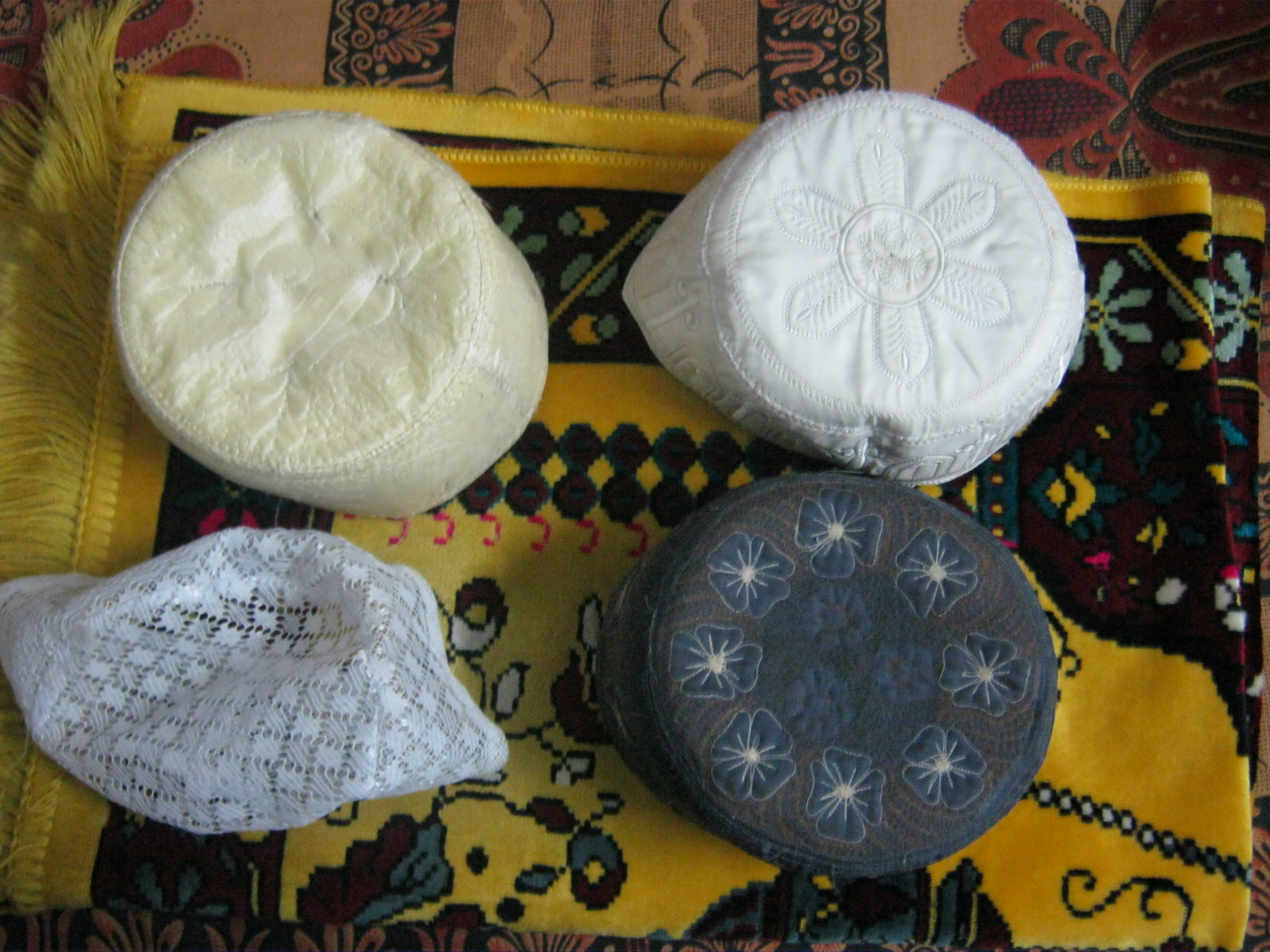
Four traditional types of topi in Bangladesh

The prayer cap in Bangladesh is known as a ṭupi, from the Prakrit term ṭopiā, meaning 'helmet'. In the Chittagong and Sylhet divisions, it is known as the toki, from the Arabic term طاقية. Topis made in Comilla and Nilphamari are exported to the Middle East.

The Indian topi worn by Muslim men in Bangladesh and South Asia should not be confused with the Dhaka topi, which is worn by men in Nepal.

==== Pakistan ====
The prayer cap is called a topi. Pakistani men wear a variety of other caps including the Sindhi topi, a mirrored cap with a front opening that allows the wearer to place the forehead on the ground during prayer. Other caps include the karakul (hat), fez (hat) and pakol.

==== Russia ====
Muslim men wear the tubeteika. In Russia, the tubeteika is worn with a suit for Eid ul Fitr or Jumu'ah, and a tuxedo for wedding ceremonies. Russian Muslims also wear the doppa or rug cap. In Russia, giving a rug cap to a person as a gift is a sign of friendship. The Russian name for the doppa is tubeteika. In Russia, the folk costume consists of a kosovorotka for men and a sarafan for women. Among Turkic peoples, traditional Turkic costumes are worn. Russian Muslims wear a variety of fur hats including the karakul (hat), which is called an astrakhan hat in Russia, the ushanka, and the papakhi, see Islam in Russia. A Russian diplomat hat, which is a boat shaped cossack hat, is also worn. Nikita Khrushchev is said to have popularized it.

==== Somalia ====
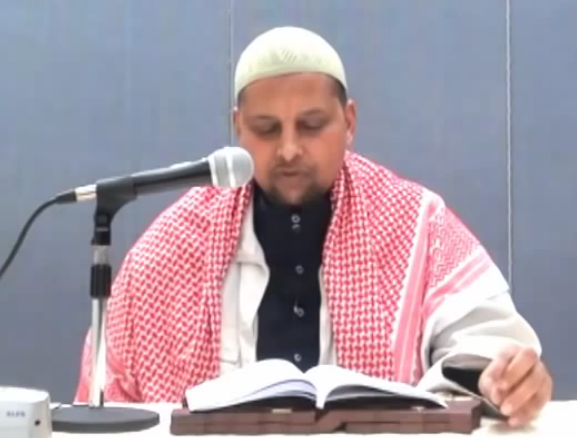
A Somali cleric wearing a taqiyah

Men in Somalia often wear the koofiyad cotton prayer cap, along with a sarong referred to as a macawiis. The jalabiya is also sometimes worn.

==== Sudan ====
The prayer cap is worn under a white turban called an imama. Sudanese men wear the white turban with a white thobe called a jalabiyyah. In the United States, the Sudanese robe is sold as an African dishdasha, Sudani or Sudanese thobe.

==== Turkey ====
Before 1925, men used to wear the fez hat and calpack, or a conical taqiyah known as the taj. However, the hat law of 1925 formally banned these forms of hats. The Turkish cap, which is similar to a beanie or tuque, can also commonly be found. The Turkish cap is made of wool or cotton fleece and has a distinctive pom-pom or toorie on top. Turkish people also wear regular cotton prayer caps. Women wear a variety of folk dresses with a waistcoast called a jelick and a veil called a yashmak. The traditional wedding dress is red. Men wear the folk costume to festivals and prayers, but most men don a suit or tuxedo for weddings. Additionally, Dervishes have a unique costume.

==== Turkmenistan ====
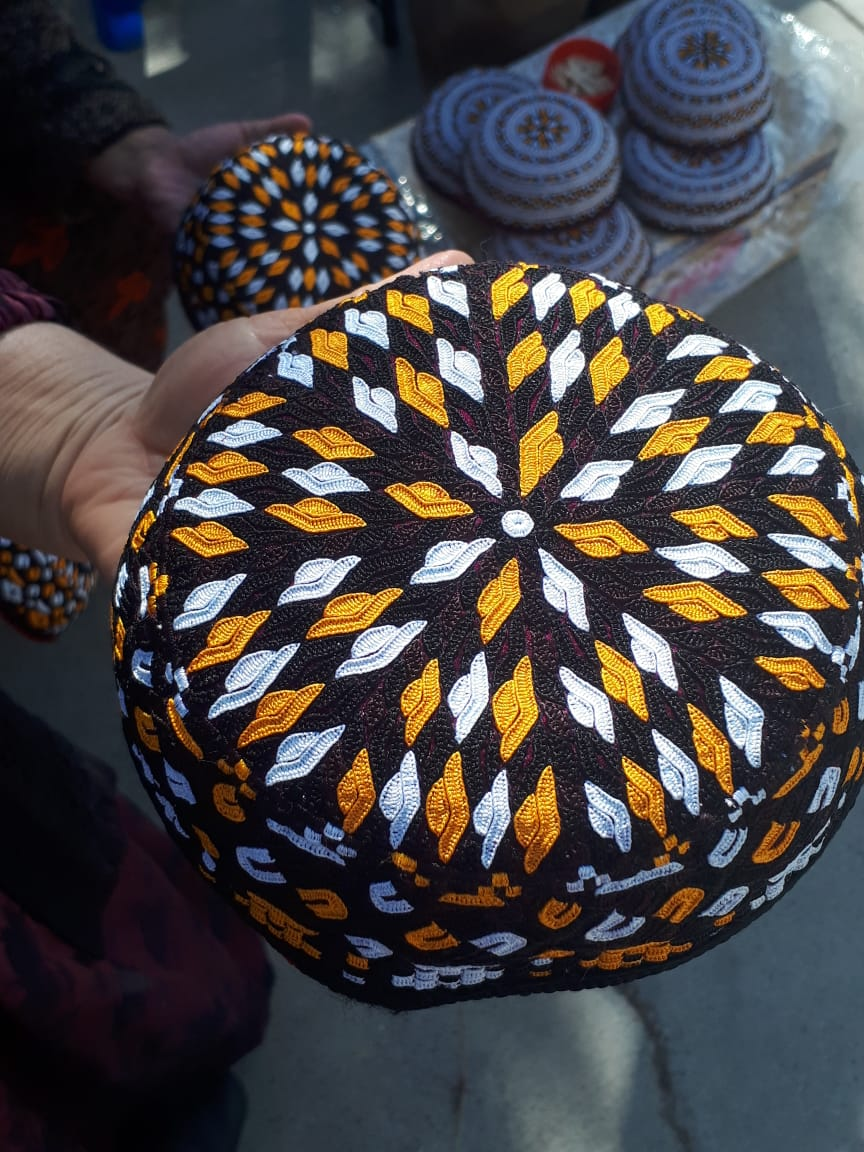
Turkmen tahýa for girls

In Turkmenistan, taqiyahs are called tahýa in the Turkmen language and are a Turkmen national headdress with embroidered national patterns. The tahýa is an indispensable item of the national male garment, often worn on daily basis, along with another traditional headgear, the telpek, a sheepskin hat.

In ancient times, Turkmens believed that the tahýa protects the owner from the evil eye and other troubles. Also, custom prohibited transferring an old tahýa to another person or throwing it away. In everyday life, the tahýa was intended to protect the head from the sun. Tahýa shapes can be oval, round, high and low. They are sewn from different fabrics such as velvet, silk, satin and chintz. Where girls' tahýas were softer and decorated with different colorful patterns, men's tahýas had restrained, simple patterns. Men put the tahýa on their shaved heads.

Among Iranian Turkmens, specially in Turkmensahra, it is called بوریک (börük) and is now only used by men. Most wear a completely white cap in everyday life, while some wear them in dark colours such as red, with little or no embroidery. Some younger people use akgaýma caps during prayer. Elders, madrasah graduates and akhuns wear a white or dark coloured cap with a usually white turban wrapped around it.

==== United Arab Emirates ====
Men in the UAE often wear the gahfiyyah cotton prayer cap. Emirati men wear the white ghutra on top of a gahfiyyah cap with a white thobe called a kandoura. In an effort to strengthen religious awareness for foreign visitors, Sheik Mohammed bin Rashid Al Maktoum, the crown prince of Dubai, has, from 2012 onwards, requested that all visiting westerners and non-Muslims adhere to Islamic dress code during religious festivals. If full adherence is impossible, a simple gahfiyyah worn during prayers will suffice.

=== By region ===
==== Central Asia ====
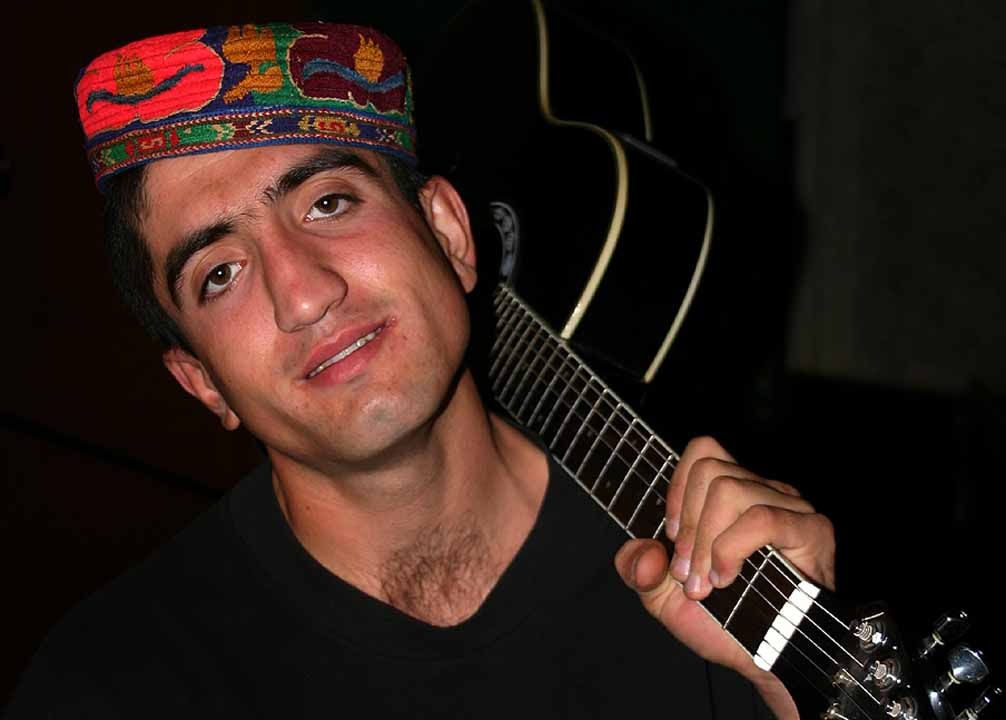
A Tajik guitar player wearing a rug cap

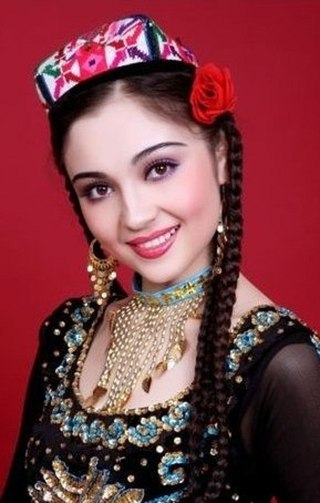
An Uyghur girl wearing a taqiyah

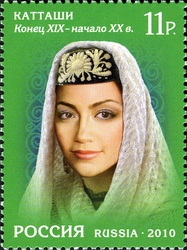
A 2010 Russian postage stamp depicting a Tatar woman wearing a taqiyah

The doppa is most common, along with the more general category of Tubeteika. In the United States, the doppa is sold as an Uzbek kufi, Bukharan kippah, Bucharian or Bokharan yarmulke (Bukharian Jews of Central Asia also wore headcoverings similar to the Doppi/Tubeteika design but wore it for religious reasons pertaining to Judaism). The doppa is also called the rug cap because the needlework is the same as that found on Uzbek oriental rugs, see Uzbek people. In Central Asia, men wear the doppa with a suit. Uzbeks also wear the tubeteika, which they call a duppi. The traditional tubeteika is a black velvet cap with white or silver embroidery. For festivals, a folk costume is worn that consists of a robe called a khalat. The khalat is often worn with a coat called a chapan. Tajiks wear the rug cap and the tubeteika. In Canada, Neil Peart, the drummer for Rush, wore a tubeteika. Also, followers of the Naqshbandi Haqqani Sufi Order wear Uzbek Kufis as Bahauddin Naqshband was from Uzbekistan and it is seen as a friendlier alternative to the austere solid black and white of some Muslims.

==== South Asia ====
The Mughal emperor Aurangzeb (r. 1658–1707) was known for spending a portion of his time knitting the taqiyah.

==== Southeast Asia ====
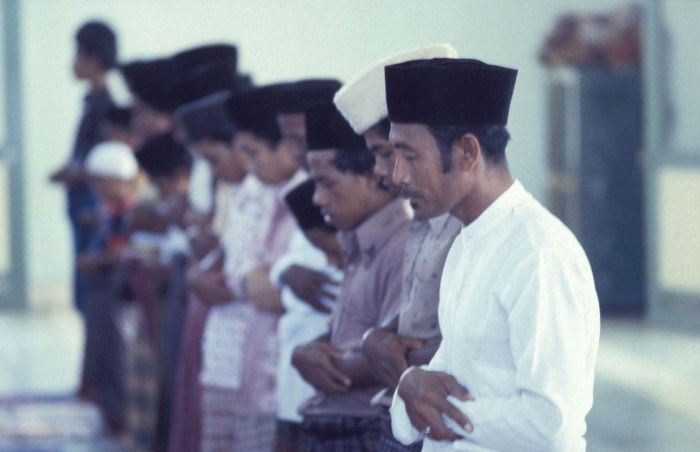
The songkok, kopiah or peci has been traditionally worn by Muslim men in Southeast Asia, as shown here during prayer.

In Indonesia, the peci, or songkok, is the national dress. Men of Malaysia and Brunei Darussalam also wear the songkok. The Indonesians also produce a machine knitted skullcap that is popular with Muslims. Javanese people wear the sarong with their caps. In Sundanese, the skullcap is called a kupluk.

Traditional Malaysian men's attire consists of a shirt, matching pants, and waist wrap that is called a baju Melayu. For informal events, and prayers at the mosque, the sarong is worn. However, a person seen wearing a songkok in Malaysia, especially in a Dewan Undangan Negeri, is not necessarily a Muslim. This is because non-Muslims are required to wear one to comply with the dress code of the assembly. Taqiyah is known as kopiah in Malaysia.

==== Balkans ====
Bosniaks traditionally wore the fez hat. After World War II, the black beret became common. In recent times, occasionally the Indian topi or generic taqiyah can be worn among more religious Bosniaks. see Islam in Bosnia and Herzegovina. During Eid ul Fitr, the prayer cap is worn with a suit. For wedding ceremonies, a tuxedo is worn.

==== Africa ====
The fez, tarboush or chechia is worn. In North Africa, men wear the djellaba with their fez hats. The short sleeved robe is the gandora.

In East Africa, the kofia is commonly worn in the Muslim communities in the coastal areas of Kenya, Tanzania, and Uganda. Some Swahili speaking populations that are Muslim wear the kofia with a white robe called a kanzu in the Swahili language. In the United States, the kanzu is sold as an Omani thobe, Emirati thobe, or Yemeni dishdasha. A white kanzu and suit jacket or blazer is the formal wear of Swahili peoples.

In West Africa, there is the kufi hat, or alasho/tagelmust turban, which is worn with the grand boubou for all official functions, weddings, and Islamic celebrations. Another West African robe is called a Senegalese kaftan which is similar to an Arabic thobe, but with a different tailored cut, and the kufi or fez is often worn with it. As in Morocco, the gandora and djellaba is also worn by West African men, especially in domestic settings or for in-home prayers.

== See also ==
- Kufi
- Dhaka topi
- Plis
- Fez (headdress worn in the Middle East and Balkans)
- Islamic clothing
- Kalimavkion
- Keffiyeh (headdress worn in the Middle East)
- Kippah (skullcap worn by Jews)
- Klobuk
- Kufi (cap worn by men in Africa)
- List of hat styles
- List of headgear
- Pakol
- Religious clothing
- Sindhi cap
- Skufia
- Tafiyah (ru:Тафья) - 16th century Russian undercap (a little cap wearing under bigger cap) of nobles, originated from Tatars' taqiyah
- Tubeteika (cap worn in Central Asia)
- Zucchetto (skullcap worn by clerics of Catholic churches)
