= Kumma =

Kumma may refer to:

- Kumma, Estonia, a village in Kehtna Parish, Rapla County
- Kumma, Iran, a village in Gilan Province
- Kumma (Nubia) or Semna East, an archaeological site in Sudan
- Kuma (Cap), a type of cap traditionally worn in Oman
