= Thaub =

Thaub may refer to:

- Thawb, a traditional Arab garment
- Thaub, Yemen
