= Mushanana =

Rwandese garment

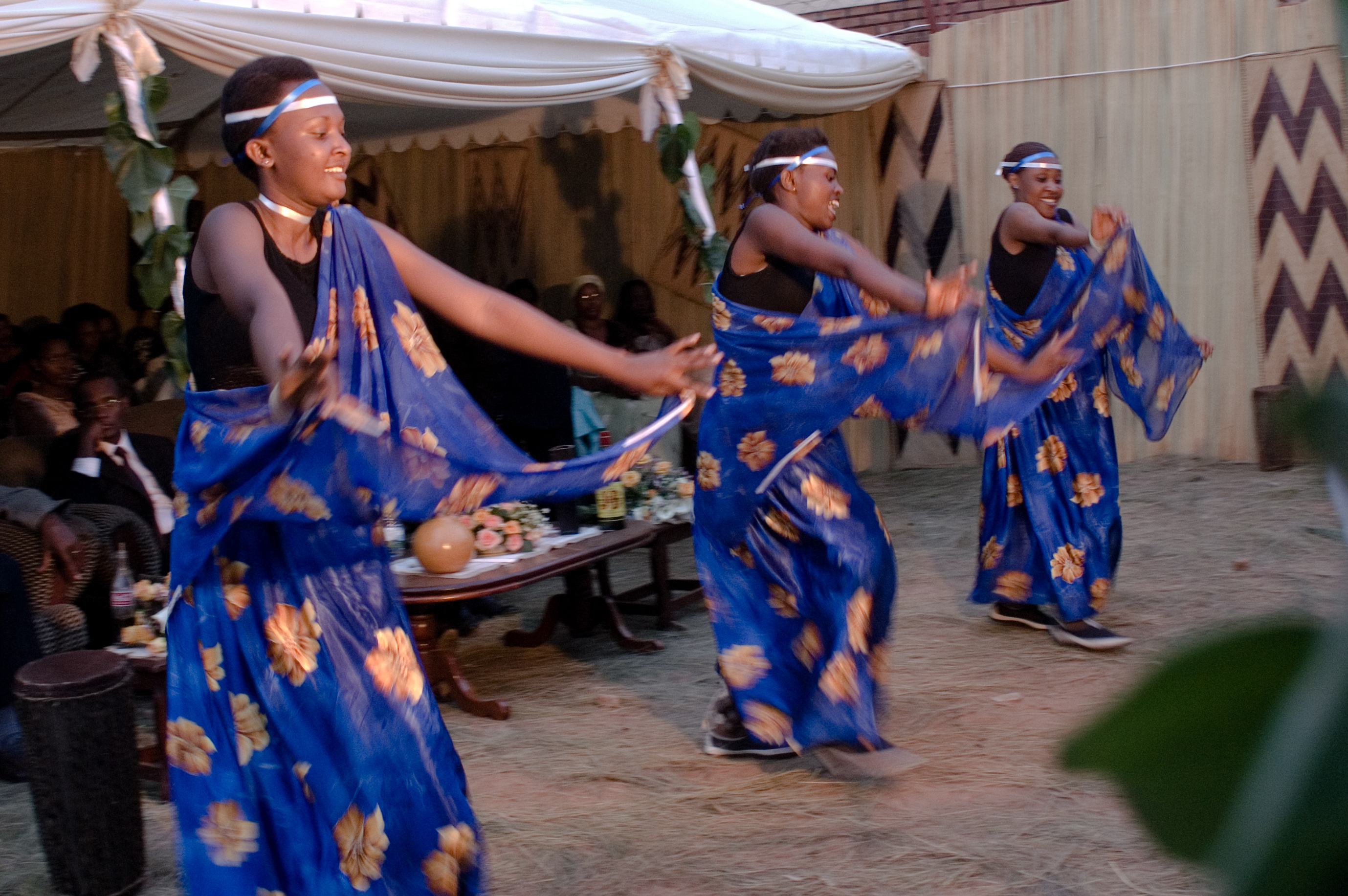
Rwandese dancers wearing mushananas

The umushanana (in plural: imishanana) is the traditional clothing dress of women in Rwanda and Burundi.

It consists of a long skirt gathered at the hips, a bustier and a stole draped over one shoulder. The fabric, which can be of any color, is generally lightweight to accentuate the draping effect.

Mushanana is now only worn for formal and ceremonial occasions such as weddings, church services or funerals, and by traditional dancers in both Rwanda and Burundi.

Mushanana is also worn by the Bafumbira women from Kisoro District in the Kigezi sub-region in the south-western part of Uganda.

== History ==
The Mushanana dates back long before colonial times and has been part of Rwandan culture for centuries.

== See also ==
- Gomesi
- Kanzu
