= Kwanjula =

Kwanjula (translated as "introduction") is a traditional marriage introduction ceremony practiced by the Baganda people of Buganda, a kingdom within modern-day Uganda. The ceremony serves as a formal introduction of a groom-to-be and his family to the bride-to-be’s family, during which marriage blessings are sought and gifts are exchanged. In custom and tradition, the Kwanjula constitutes the official customary marriage contract within Kiganda culture, often preceding civil or religious wedding ceremonies.

== Background and cultural significance ==
Historically, the Kwanjula was a private family meeting aimed at establishing lineages and ensuring that the impending marriage adhered to Kiganda clan structures, avoiding exogamy restrictions. Over time, the ceremony has evolved into a highly orchestrated public celebration involving extended families, friends, and community members, while still retaining its strict core cultural protocols.

Unlike Western-style engagements, a marriage is considered socially and culturally binding once the Kwanjula is successfully concluded and the bride's father grants his blessing.

== Key elements and proceedings ==
=== Spokespersons (Abogezi) ===
The proceedings are led by two primary external figures: the Omwogezi w’Abako (representing the groom's entourage) and the Omwogezi w’Abanyansi (representing the bride's family). The interaction between the two spokespersons is conducted entirely in the Luganda language and takes the form of a structured, witty debate filled with proverbs (engero), humor, and historical riddles to test the intentions and knowledge of the visiting family.

=== Traditional attire ===
Participants dress in traditional Kiganda attire:

- Men: The groom and his entourage wear the Kanzu, a cream or white floor-length tunic, typically paired with a Western-style suit jacket.
- Women: The bride and female attendees wear the Gomesi (also known as a Busuuti), a brightly colored, floor-length dress featuring pointed shoulders and a large silk sash tied around the waist. The bride typically changes into multiple distinct Gomesis throughout the ceremony to mark different stages of the introduction.

=== The role of the Senga ===
The Senga (the bride's paternal aunt) holds central authority during the event. Having traditionally mentored the bride in matters of marriage and adulthood, she is responsible for stepping forward into the courtyard to officially identify the groom among the guests, verifying his identity to the family elders before negotiations can proceed.

=== Gift-giving and Omutwalo ===
The groom’s family is required to bring a variety of material goods as appreciation to the bride's family for raising her. These gifts typically include foodstuffs (such as baskets of matooke and livestock), household utilities, and traditional clothing (Kanzus and Gomesis) for the parents and the Senga.

The most critical element is the Omutwalo, the primary token requested specifically by the bride's father. Historically, this was a symbolic item, but in modern practices, it often takes the form of a holy book (a Bible or a Quran) alongside other specified household or commercial assets. In Kiganda culture, these items are explicitly defined as tokens of appreciation rather than a commercial bride price.

== Contemporary developments and criticism ==
In the 21st century, the Kwanjula has faced media scrutiny and internal cultural debate regarding its growing commercialization and lavishness. Cultural critics and Buganda kingdom officials have expressed concern that modern ceremonies have transformed from dignified family contracts into overly expensive, performative spectacles. Issues such as the extortionate pricing of modern bride wealth lists, the renting of luxury assets (like cars or refrigerators) solely for display during the event, and late-night delays have been cited as burdens that discourage young couples from formalizing their relationships.

Furthermore, improper conduct by modern masters of ceremonies (spokespersons) and uncustomary entertainment trends led the Buganda Kingdom Parliament (Lukiiko) to introduce mandatory regulations. The kingdom now requires official permits and certifications for spokespersons to preserve the intrinsic linguistic and historical values of the ceremony.

== See also ==
- Gomesi
- Kanzu
- Culture of Uganda
- Baganda
