= Kufi =

Cap worn primarily by both Muslim men, and men of West African heritage

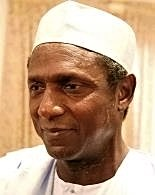
The late President Umaru Yar'Adua of Nigeria, a chieftain of the Hausa emirate of Katsina, wearing a crown style kufi.

A kufi or kufi cap is a brimless, short, and rounded cap worn by men in many populations in North, East, and West Africa, South Asia, and the Middle East. It is also worn by men throughout the African diaspora. The cap has strong associations with many Islamic cultures and pan-African pride. In the United States and the United Kingdom, it is also called a "taqiyah".

== Etymology ==
The word is derived from Arabic, where the keffiyeh (كُوفِيَّة) is a style of cotton headdress. This influenced Swahili’s kofia hat, and ultimately West Africa’s “kufi” cap.

In the Yoruba language, Ade means crown, and fila means cap. Other West African names include fula, fila, and malo hat.

== Islamic and Pan-African usage ==
The hat has strong associations with many Islamic cultures, as well as Pan-African pride. In West Africa, a kufi cap is the traditional hat for men, and is part of the national costume of most of the countries in the region. It is worn by Muslims, and African Christians. Many grandfathers and other older men wear a kufi every day to symbolize their status as wise elders, religious people, or family patriarchs.

Within the United States, it has become identified primarily with persons of West African heritage, who wear it to show pride in their culture, history, and religion (whether Christianity, Islam, or Traditional African religions). It is often made of kente cloth, mudcloth, or knitted or crocheted in a variety of yarns.

Crown style kufis are the traditional hat worn with formal West African attire. A formal dashiki suit will always include a crown style kufi, while the knitted style is most appropriate for non-formal occasions. Other caps are also worn with the dashiki, Senegalese kaftan, and grand boubou.

In the United States today, many African Americans wear the kufi during weddings, funerals, graduations and Kwanzaa celebrations. Furthermore, people of mainly West African heritage of all faiths wear the kufi, although it is associated more with members of the Islamic faith.

A West African king or tribal chief may have royal or noble arms embroidered on the kufi.

For members of the Christian faith, the kufi is unisex, and is also worn by women. Crochet and knitted styles are preferred by young girls and infants.

Traditionally, when worn by men, the kufi is a sign of peace, mourning, renewal or protection of the mind.

== Other use ==
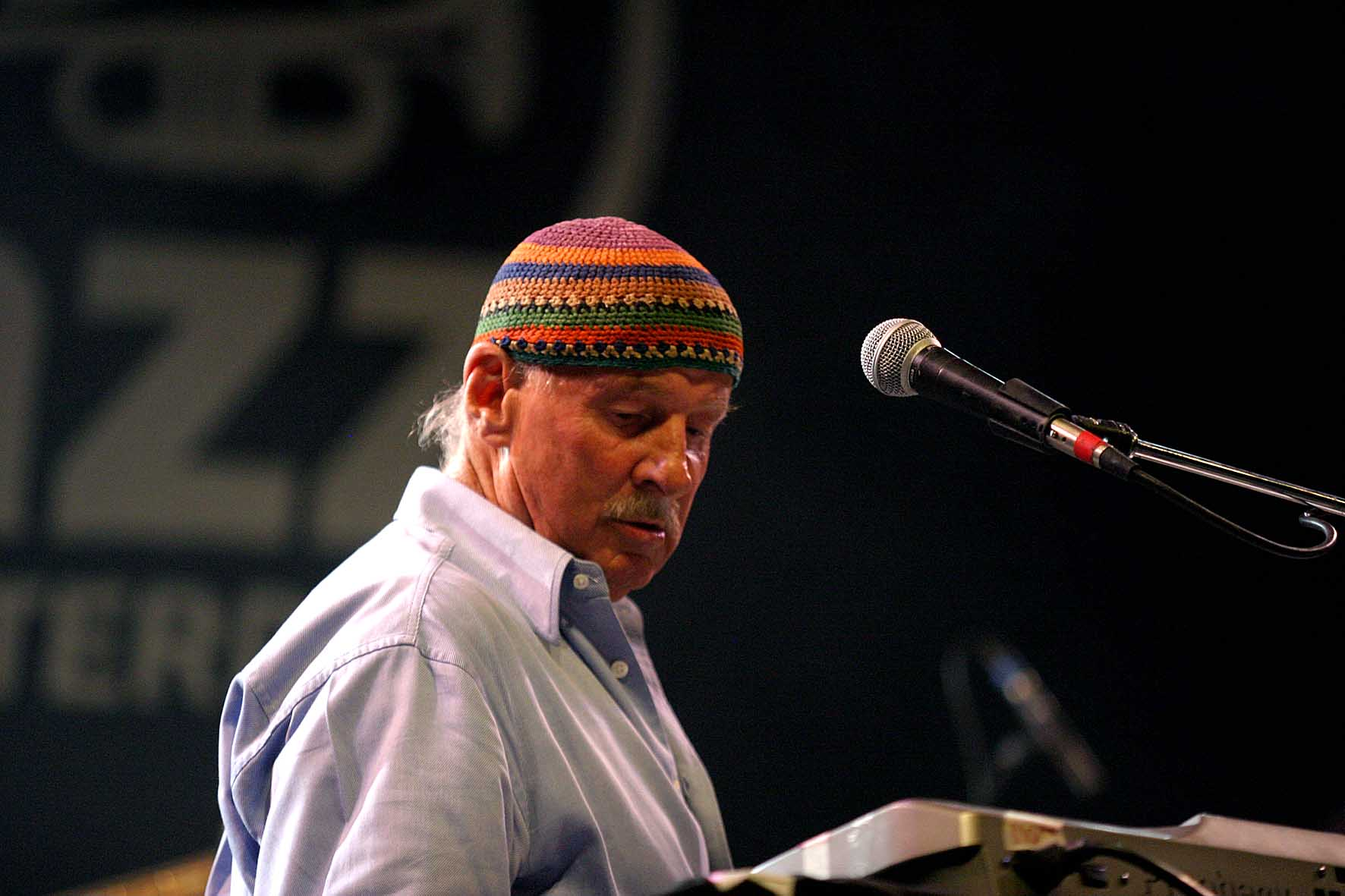
Jazz fusion keyboardist Joe Zawinul performing on stage and wearing a kufi cap.

Jazz rock/jazz fusion Weather Report frontman and keyboardist Joe Zawinul wore kufi caps for a long time, both on stage with the band and outside of it, in his private/personal life. He is known for having changed various kufi models throughout the passing of time as well, as shown in the live performances of Weather Report from the 1970s and 1980s. Dutch progressive rock musician Thijs van Leer also wore kufi caps during his early career with his band, Focus, in the 1970s. He can be seen wearing one in the music video for "House of the King" (also the theme song for the British TV show Saxondale). In addition, Rush drummer Neil Peart took to wearing a kufi during performances after touring Cameroon by bicycle in 1988.

== See also ==
- List of hat styles
- List of headgear
- Taqiyah
- Fez
- Sharbush
- Kippah
- Smoking cap
- Turban
- Women's wrapper and kaftan
