= Robe =

Loose-fitting outer garment

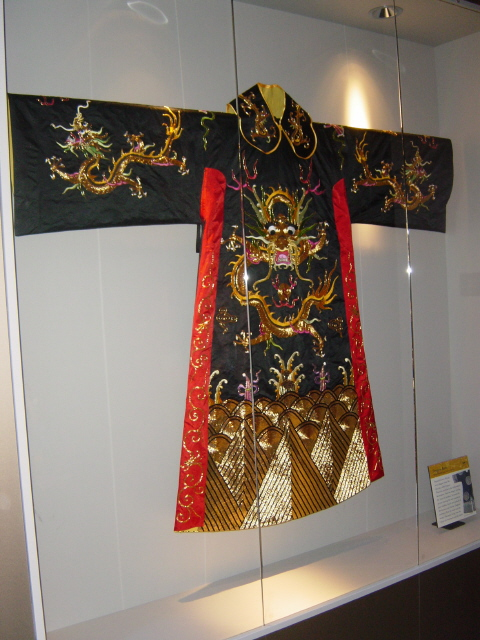
A dragon-themed robe originating from the Qing dynasty

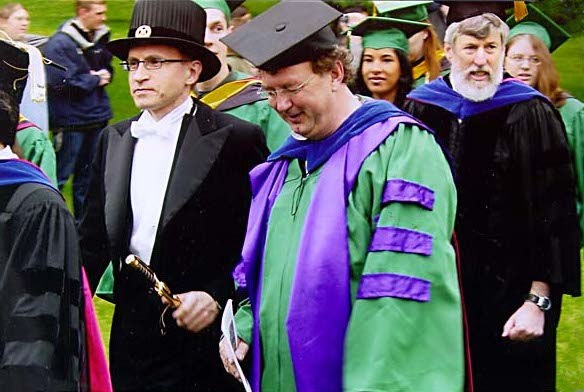
Academic robes

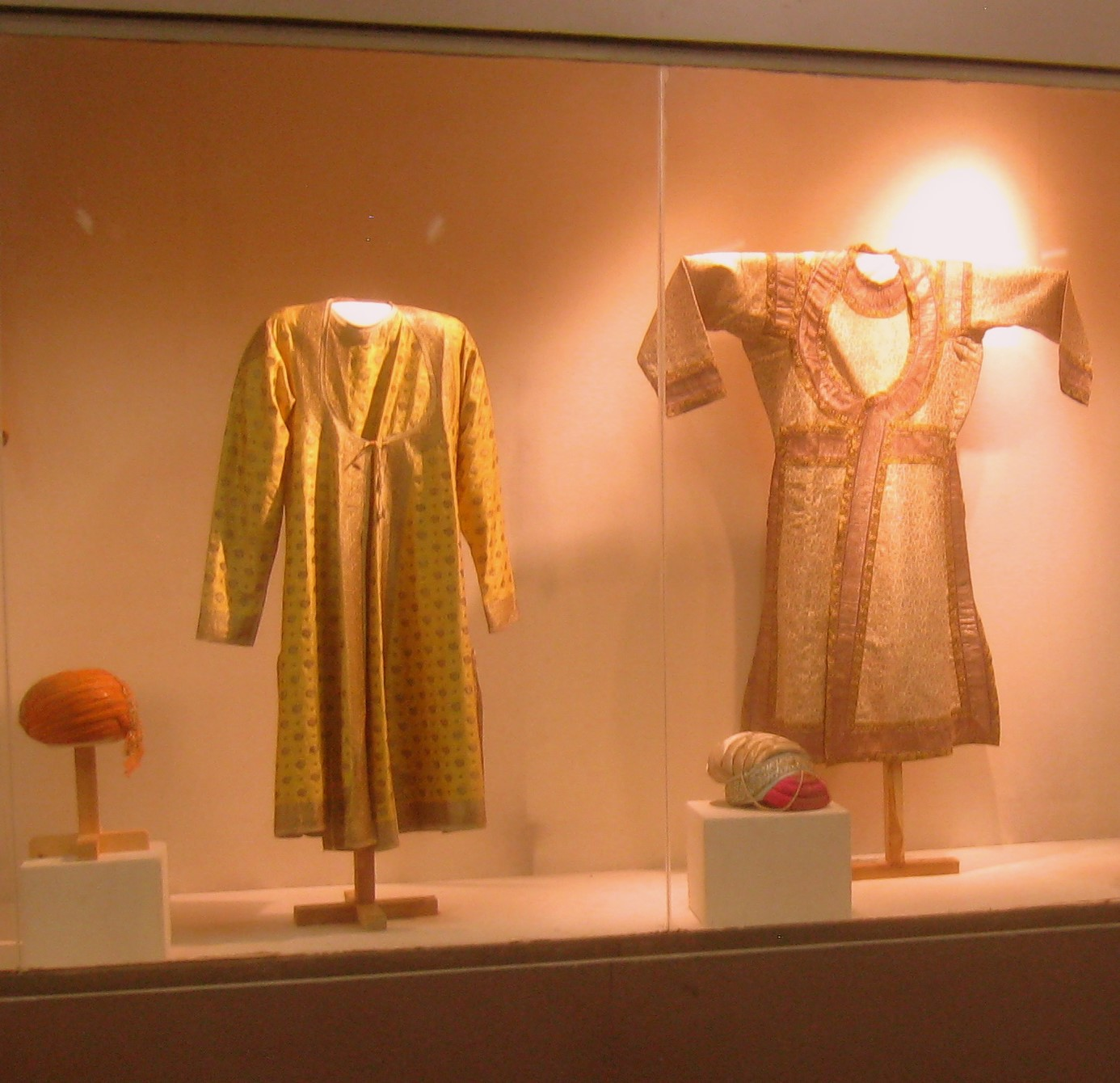
An Indian Angarkha

A robe is a loose-fitting outer garment. Unlike garments described as capes or cloaks, robes usually have sleeves. The English word robe derives from Middle English robe ("garment"), borrowed from Old French robe ("booty, spoils"), itself taken from the Frankish word *rouba ("spoils, things stolen, clothes"), and is related to the word rob.

== Types ==
There are various types of robes, including:

- A gown worn as part of the academic regalia of faculty or students, especially for ceremonial occasions, such as a convocations, congregations or graduations.
- A gown worn as part of the attire of a judge or barrister.
- A wide variety of long, flowing religious dress including pulpit robes and the robes worn by various types of monks.
- A gown worn as part of the official dress of a peer or royalty.
- Any of several women's fashions of French origin, as robe à l'anglaise (18th century), robe de style (1920s).
- A gown worn in fantasy literature and role-playing games by wizards and other magical characters.
- A bathrobe worn mostly after bathing or swimming.
- A gown used to cover a state of underdress, often after rising in the morning, is called a dressing gown. These gowns are similar to a bathrobe but without the absorbent material and are often ankle-length.
- (Informal usage) Any long flowing garment; for example, a cassock is sometimes called a robe, although a cassock is close-fitting.
- A cured animal hide with fur or hair still attached, often from a buffalo, either worn or used in the home for warmth.

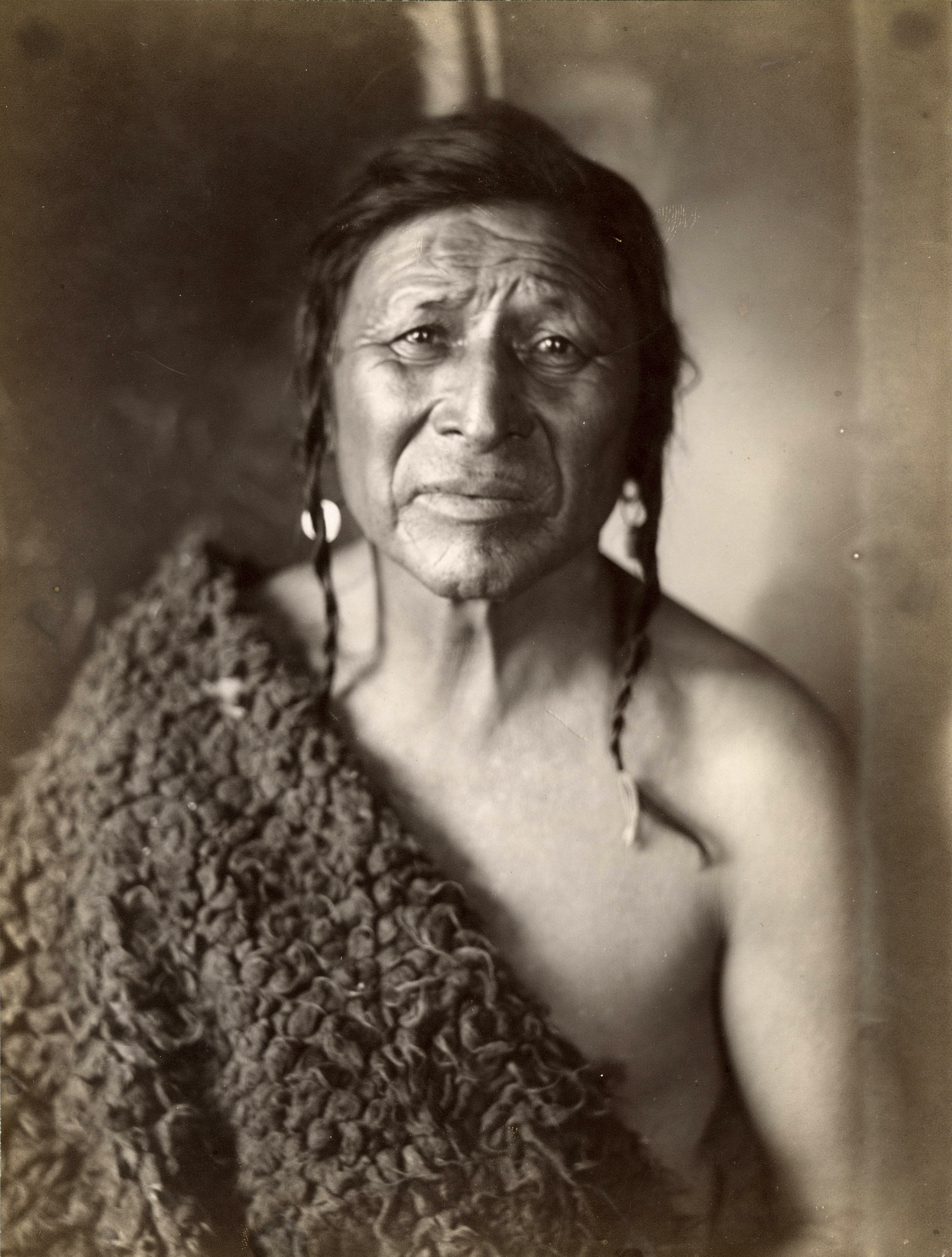
White Swan wearing a buffalo robe

== See also ==
- Abaya - women's garment from Middle East/North Africa
- Angarkha
- Academic stole
- Buffalo robe - buffalo hide used by Native Americans
- Chuba - the common dress of Tibetans
- Clothing
- Kaftan
- Kimono - traditional Japanese garment
- Mantle (royal garment)
- Seamless robe of Jesus - Biblical relic
- Senegalese kaftan
- Thawb - ankle-length garment often worn in many places in the Middle East and Africa
- Tricivara - Buddhist monastic robe
- Wrap dress
