= Kofia (hat) =

Hand-embroidered cylindrical caps worn by Muslim men

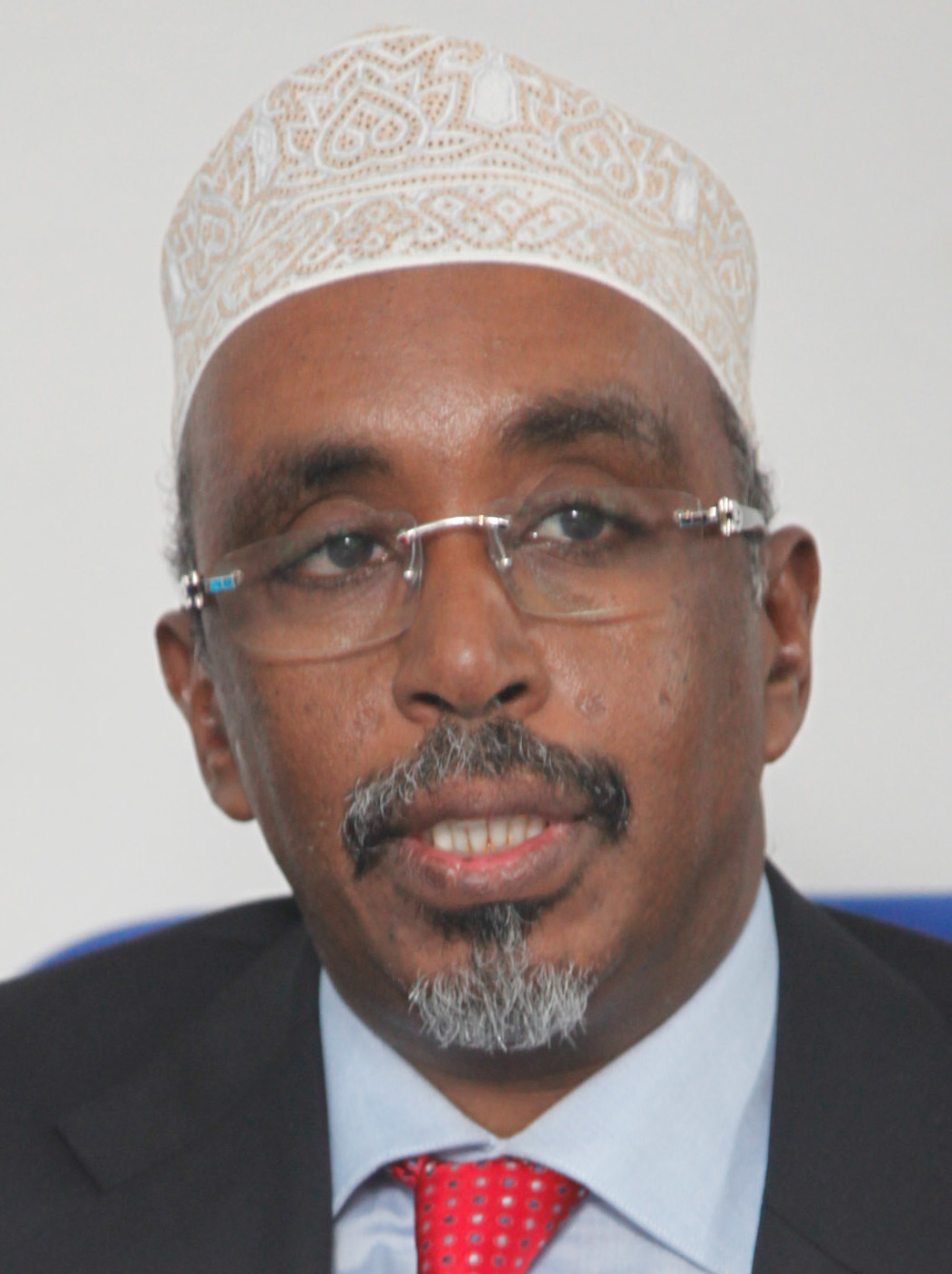
Sharif Hassan Sheikh Aden, then speaker of the parliament of Somalia, wearing the traditional kofia (2011)

The kofia is a type of brimless cylindrical headwear with a flat top, widely worn by Muslim men in East Africa, and the horn of Africa including Somalia. The city of Barawa is famous for its weaving of kofia called koofiya baraawi. The kofia is a sign of peace, mourning and renewal, as well as protection of one's mind. Many believe that they are a symbol of a man's Islamic identity and are worn as a sign of reverence for Allah.

== Description ==
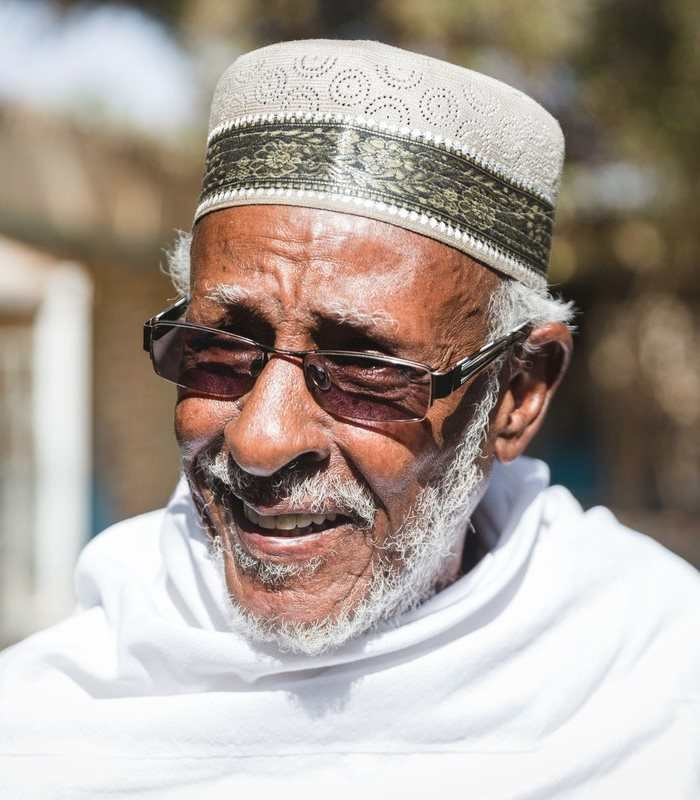
Hadrawi, a Somali poet and orator wearing a variant of the kofia

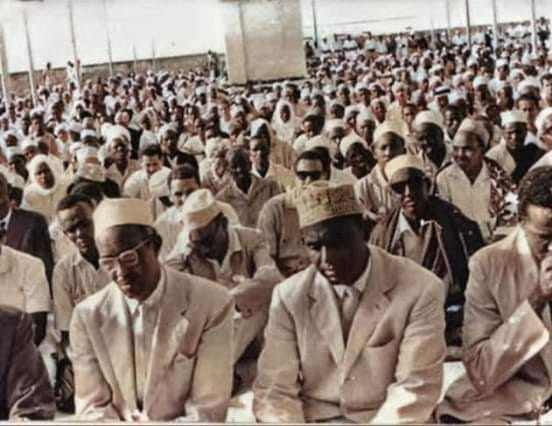
President Aden Adde alongside Prime minister Sharmarke.

The Kofia, a traditional headwear in Harar (eastern Ethiopia) and Somalia, is a round headdress with no brim and a flat crown. It is intricately crafted from woven colored cloth adorned with embroidered patterns in a variety of hues. This cap features small circular perforations incorporated into the fabric, serving both as a decorative element and a functional design to promote airflow and ventilation.

As an essential component of the Somali traditional attire for men, the Kofia is commonly donned as part of everyday dressing, embodying cultural significance and heritage. Its widespread usage in Somalia underscores its cultural importance and sartorial relevance, highlighting its role as a symbol of identity and tradition within the Somali community.

On 27 November 1962, during his state visit to the White House, Prime Mininister of the Somali Republic, Dr. Abdirashid Ali Shermarke, presented a Kofia to President Kennedy as gift.

== Related headwear ==
=== Omani Kuma ===
A kuma (كمة) is a rounded Omani cap traditionally worn by men. It is flat on the top with the rim folded inwards, and is often white decorated with various ornate colourful designs. It is specially sized (as opposed to one size fits all) and has small holes throughout the embroidery which help keep the head cool in the hot Omani sun. It is frequently worn as day-to-day attire.

=== East African Kofi ===
The kofi is worn by Swahili men in East Africa, especially in Kenya, Uganda, Tanzania, Malawi, and north and coast of Mozambique along with the eastern part of Democratic Republic of Congo. It forms part of a broader tradition of Islamic dress in the western Indian Ocean world. It is described as originating from Oman through Zanzibar. It is also commonly worn in Oman and is popular in Comoros. The kofi is often worn with a dashiki, a colorful African shirt which is called a kitenge shirt in some regions of East Africa. In Uganda, the kofia is worn with the kanzu (a white or cream-coloured tunic) on informal occasions. It forms part of a broader tradition of Islamic dress in the western Indian Ocean world.

=== Bargashia ===
In Zanzibar, and Northern Uganda, the Bargashia is a popular hat. This hat was named after Barghash bin Said of Zanzibar, the former Sultan of Zanzibar. Unlike the kofia, it is covered in embroidery and does not have pin holes. Like the kofia, the bargashia is worn with the kanzu.

=== Fez ===
The fez is also worn with the kanzu and dashiki in East Africa. The East African style has a tassel that hangs from the top of the hat. The red fez was introduced into the region by the military. During British colonial rule of East Africa, the red fez was worn by a regiment called the King's African Rifles. The fez is also worn in West Africa, but the West African version has a stem on top of the hat, and no tassel.

The Cape Malays in Cape Town, South Africa, whose menfolk wear fezzes, sometimes refer to the fez as a kofia (also spelt kofija).

== See also ==
- Kopiah, a cap worn in Indonesia
- Kufi, a cap worn in West Africa
- Kufiyyeh, a headdress worn in the Middle East
- Kuma, a cap worn in Oman
- List of hat styles
