= Kanzu =

Traditional garment of the African Great Lakes region

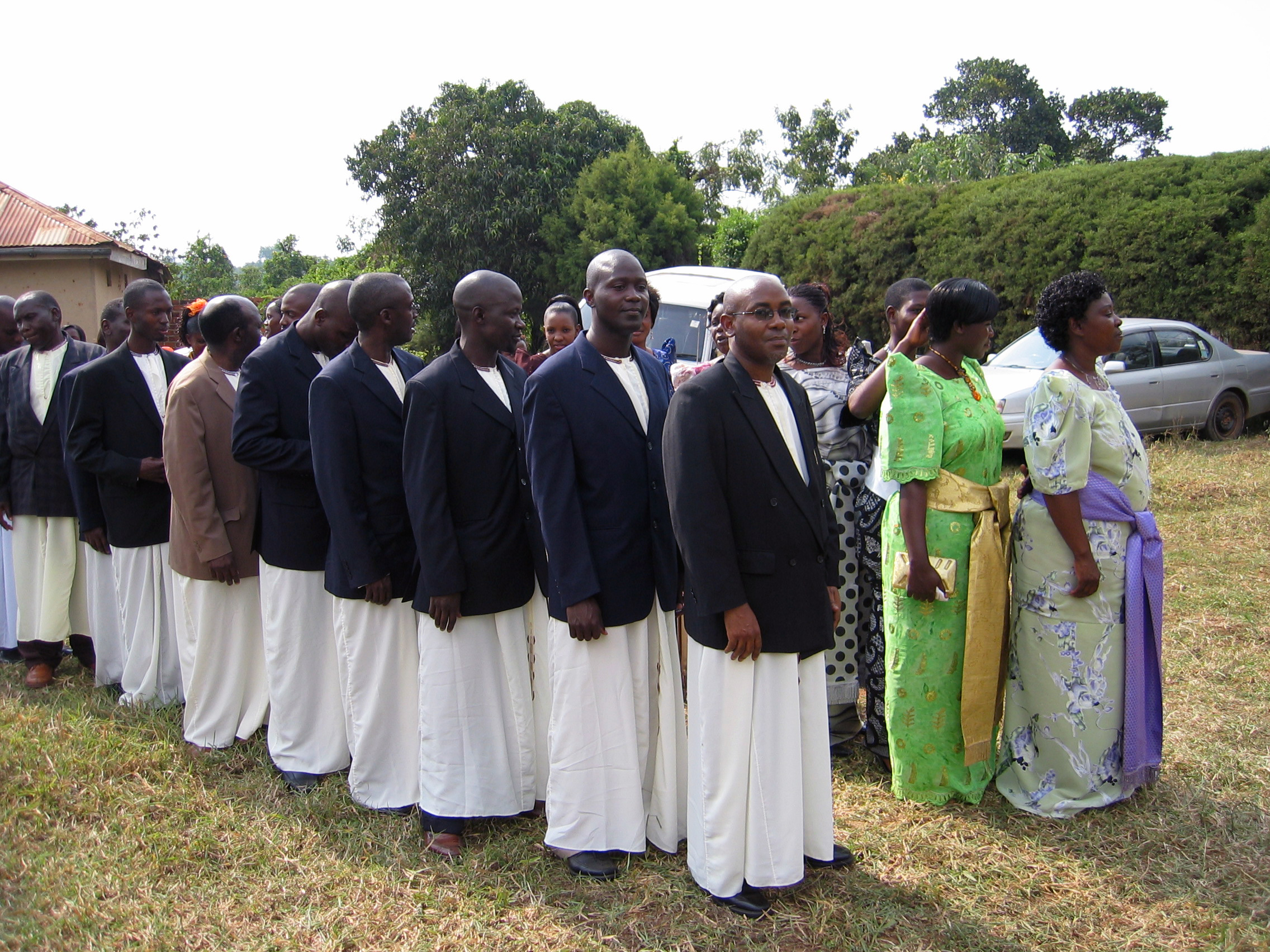
Men wearing kanzus at a wedding in Kampala, Uganda.

A kanzu is a white or cream coloured robe worn by men in the African Great Lakes region. It is referred to as a tunic in English, and as the thawb in Arab countries. The kanzu is an ankle or floor length garment. It serves as the national costume of Tanzania as well as the Comoros, where it is called a kandu as well as a thawb. The robe is also worn in some coastal Muslim regions of Tanzania and Kenya. The men of Uganda consider it their most important dress. Kanzu is a Ganda word of Swahili origin, which means "robe" or "tunic". In Tanzania, the term is used interchangeably with kaftan.

== Ugandan kanzu ==
The Kiganda/Ugandan kanzu was introduced to the Buganda Kingdom by Arab traders. Kabaka Ssuuna was the first Kabaka of Buganda to wear the kanzu. After the Kabaka adopted the attire it became the formal wear of all Baganda men. The kanzu spread from the Baganda people to other ethnicities and is a national costume of Baganda men. (The Republic of Uganda has no pan-national costume for men as in neighboring Tanzania).

It is a variation of the Arabic thobe. Originally, the kanzu was made from barkcloth. Today the kanzu is made from silk, cotton, poplin, or linen. Linen kanzus are the most expensive. The main difference between the kanzu and the Arabic thobe is the design.

The traditional kanzu has maroon embroidery around the collar, abdomen, and sleeves. The embroidery is called the 'omuleela'. Some modern designers create a design of the kingdom emblem (shield, spear, and low-lying lion) lying at the lower part of the muleela. The major center of kanzu knitting and production is Mende, Uganda, but they are widely sold around the central business district in Kampala in places such as Kiyembe, Nakivubo, and other assorted shops.

The kanzu is worn at wedding ceremonies during the introduction (also known as the Kwanjula). During the Kwanjula the groom's family is required to appear dressed in kanzu and they must also present a kanzu to the bride's family.

The kanzu is worn with a suit jacket, blazer, or sport coat. It is customary for important persons to wear the kanzu with a black bisht. Traditional attire for women in Baganda is the Gomesi.

In popular culture, Ugandan clothing was featured in the film, The Last King of Scotland.

== Tanzanian kanzu ==
In Tanzania, the kanzu was introduced by Arab traders and missionaries from Oman who were conducting dawah. The Tanzanian kanzu is identical to the Arabic thobe. Originally, the kanzu was made from silk. Today, due to Islamic restrictions on silk garments, it is made from polyester or other synthetic fabrics made to resemble silk. The distinctive feature of the Tanzanian kanzu is the tassel that hangs from the collar. In some families, the tassel is perfumed with African oils or Arabic attar (oils) before wedding ceremonies. The kanzu is always worn with a kofia, a small embroidered cap.

In the West, and in many Arab countries, the Tanzanian kanzu is sold by merchants as an Omani thobe, Yemini dishdasha, or Emirati thobe. The best quality kanzus are manufactured in the United Arab Emirates. HKT is one of the manufacturers. Inexpensive Saudi- and Chinese-made versions are common.

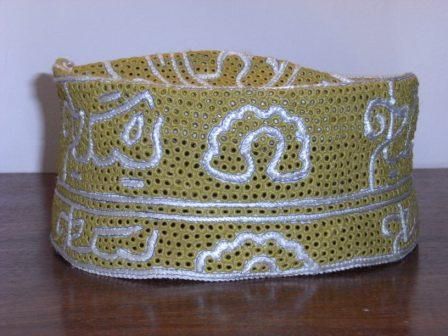
A traditional Kofia (cap).

Among the Swahili men of Tanzania and Kenya, the kanzu is always worn with a suit jacket, blazer, or sport coat. For formal wear a Tanzanian man will don a kanzu, a suit jacket, and a kofia (cap). Tribal chiefs wear the kanzu with a black bisht when attending a black tie event. A white or ivory bisht is worn to white tie events. In many Western countries, the bisht is sold by merchants as a Saudi abaya or Abayah. According to custom, a kanzu must be crisp, that is dry cleaned and starched, before it is suitable for formal wear.

The kanzu is the national costume of Tanzania, and is the formal wear of most of the tribes in the country. For informal events, a Saudi manufactured thobe with a mandarin collar or the dashiki shirt and a kofia is the traditional attire. Although the Tanzanian kanzu was borrowed from Arab culture, it is worn by all religious faiths, including Christians, Muslims, African Jews, and members of African traditional religions.

== Kenya ==
In Kenya, the kanzu is worn by Muslims of all tribes. Christians rarely wear the kanzu for informal events, including church services. The formal wear for Christian weddings mainly use the dashiki shirt or kitenge shirt. Both religious communities wear a kofia, a small cap with the kanzu. In Kenya, it is customary for tribal chiefs and Muslim Imams to wear a black bisht with the kanzu when attending a formal event. Kenya is the only African country that does not have a national costume, thus, many Kenyan men wear European suits or tuxedos for weddings and other formal events. Others have started to wear the Nigerian national costume, called an Agbada. In Kenya, male Members of the Parliament are required to wear a European-style suit to sessions.

== West Africa ==
In West Africa, similar yet highly distinct clothing are worn by predominantly Sahelian peoples. These include the Senegalese kaftan and the Boubou (often worn on formal occasions).

== Wedding attire ==
The kanzu is the traditional wedding attire for men in the Great Lakes region. During wedding ceremonies it is customary for the groom to wear a white kanzu and a kofia. In Tanzania and Kenya, the groom wears a black or white bisht on top of the kanzu. The groomsmen and other men who are members of the wedding party wear the kanzu with a suit jacket. In Uganda, the groom wears a suit jacket on top of the kanzu, and the bride's attire is the gomesi.

In Tanzania and Kenya, the bride's attire is a white wedding dress or the West African boubou. Use of wedding attire characteristic of the Great Lakes region has spread throughout the African diaspora. There are also some locals who prefer to wed in West African attire (see the dashiki).

== See also ==
- Senegalese kaftan – robe worn by men in West Africa
- Grand boubou – three-piece robe worn by men in West Africa and parts of the Maghreb.
- Gomesi – dress worn by women in Uganda
- Kanga – wrapper worn by women in the African Great Lakes region
- Kofia
- Bisht – cloak worn over the kanzu by tribal chiefs, imams, and kings
- Buganda
- Swahili people
- National costume
