= Bogart Man =

South African men's fashion brand

- Headquarters: Italy
- Owner: Eli Saig
- Website: https://www.bogart.co.za/
- Launched: 2000; 26 years ago
- Current status: Active

Bogart Man is a South African-based fashion house established in 2000, founded by designer Eli Saig (born February 3, 1966), an Israeli fashion guru.

The company is best-known for making fashionable garments for men.
