= Senegalese kaftan =

Men's pullover robe worn in Senegal

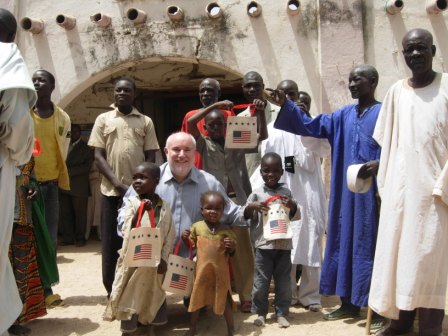
Two Senegalese kaftans being worn in Cameroon, right.

A Senegalese kaftan is a pullover men's robe with long bell sleeves. In the Wolof language, this robe is called a mbubb or xaftaan and in French it is called a boubou. The Senegalese caftan is an ankle length garment. It is worn with matching drawstring pants called tubay in Wolof. Normally made of cotton brocade, lace, or synthetic fabrics, these robes are common throughout West Africa. A kaftan and matching pants is called a kaftan suit. The kaftan suit can be worn with a kufi cap. Senegalese kaftans are formal wear in all West African countries. In the United States, some merchants sell this robe as a Senegalese style dashiki pant set or a full length dashiki pant set. Men who are members of the Hausa tribe, wear these kaftans to formal events like naming ceremonies and weddings. In the United States, a kaftan is one of three formal suits, equivalent to the tuxedo, that African-American grooms select for their weddings. The other styles being the dashiki pant set, and the grand boubou, pronounced gran boo-boo. There are various other formal robes that are worn throughout West Africa, and with the exception of the Yoruba Gbarie robe, pronounced barry, most of these are a form of Islamic dress, see sartorial hijab. The kaftan is worn by Christians, African Jews, Muslims, and followers of African traditional religion. Furthermore, Senegalese kaftans are common among men of African descent in the African diaspora. The Senegalese kaftan is men's attire. In West Africa, and the United States, this robe is not worn by women. The women's robe is called a kaftan.

== Wedding attire ==
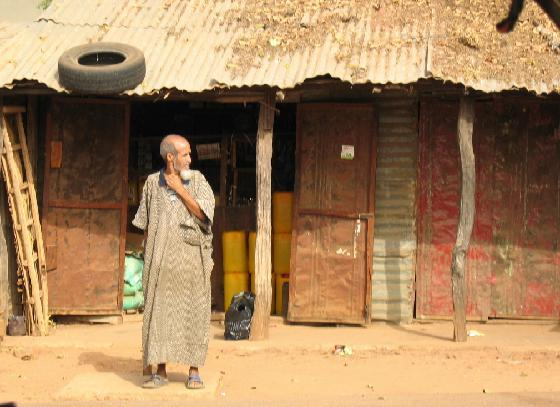
A Maghrebi kaftan being worn in The Gambia, West Africa.

A white kaftan is worn for weddings. The bride's attire is a buba and wrapper set or a woman's kaftan that is the same color as the groom's Senegalese.

== Informal kaftans ==
Another robe that is occasionally seen in West Africa is the short-sleeved Maghrebi kaftan, also called a thobe, dishdasha, or jalabiyyah. These kaftans are used as pajamas or lounge wear. In the home, they are worn on top of underwear. Some men wear the Maghrebi kaftan outside the home. When worn outside, it is customary to wear the Maghrebi kaftan over a long or short sleeve t-shirt or turtleneck and a pair of pants, jeans, or shorts. The Maghrebi kaftan can be worn with a knitted or crown style kufi cap. In Maghreb, this robe is called a gandora or djellaba in Morocco, gandoura or djebba in Algeria, djebba or jebba in Tunisia and jalabiya in Libya. Although widely worn, Moroccan kaftans are not formal attire in any West African country. Recently, some tribes have started to wear the Tanzanian kanzu for informal occasions, including church services, or Friday prayers at the mosque.

== See also ==
- Thawb
- Kanzu - tunic worn by men in East Africa
- Dashiki
- Kufi
- Wolof people
- Hausa people
