= Thaub, Yemen =

Thaub
- Location in Yemen
- Coordinates: 16°03′N 43°53′E
- Country: Yemen
- Governorate: 'Amran
- Time zone: UTC+3 (Yemen Standard Time)

Thaub or Thawb (officially, Kharāb ath Thawb, also Romanized as H̱arâb et-Taub) is a city in Yemen.
