= Kuma (cap) =

Headwear used in Oman

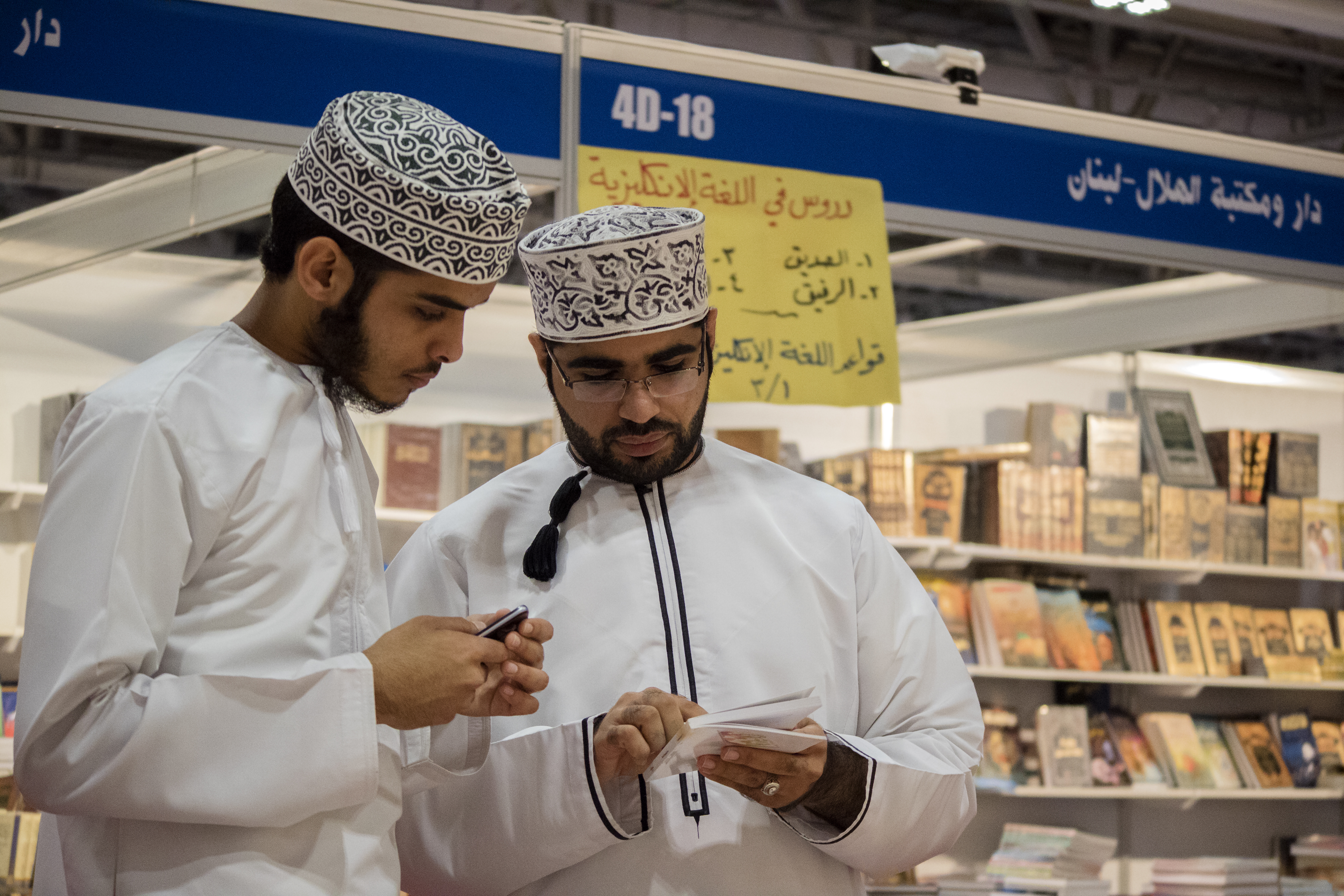
Omani men wearing Kummahs

A Kuma (كمة) is a rounded Omani cap traditionally worn by men. It is flat on the top with the rim folded inwards, and is often white decorated with various ornate colourful designs. It is specially sized (as opposed to one size fits all) and has small holes throughout the embroidery which help keep the head cool in the hot Omani sun. It is frequently worn as day-to-day attire due to Sultan Qaboos bin Said Al Said's work to maintain the nation's cultural heritage, and as such people not only wear these traditional garments often, but are incredibly proud of them and the patriotism they represent. The opinions of where the Kuma originated from is divided. One theory posits that Omanis brought it to East Africa during the empire's rule of Zanzibar. The other posits that Oman adopted it from East Africa. The Kuma is similar to the East African Kofia. It is sometimes worn with a massar on top of it, to give the massar structure.

== See also ==
- List of hat styles
