= Boubou (clothing) =

Flowing wide-sleeved robe in Africa

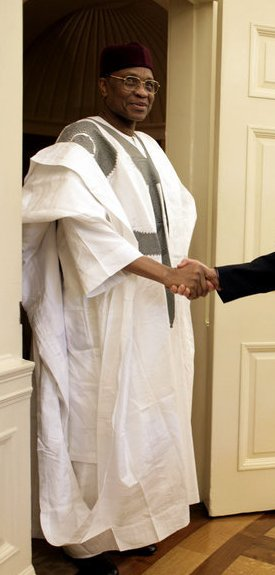
Niger President Mamadou Tandja wearing a grand boubou

The boubou, or grand boubou from Wolof mboubou, is a flowing, wide-sleeved robe worn across West Africa, and to a lesser extent in North Africa.

The garment and its variations are known by various names in different ethnic groups and languages. It is called kulwu in Kanuri, babban riga in Hausa, boubou, mbubb, mboubou in Wolof, dara'a in Hassaniya Arabic , Konkosa in Igboland, grand boubou in various French-speaking West African countries. It has some similarity with the Yoruba agbada, but with the later being its own distinct garment. The Senegalese boubou, also called grand boubou in French described below, is also known as the Senegalese kaftan.

== History ==
Its origin lies with the clothing style of the Wolof, Mande, Songhai-Zarma, Hausa, Kanuri, Toubou, and other trans-Saharan and Sahelian trading groups who used the robe as protection from elements (the harsh sun of the day and sub-freezing temperatures at night) while traversing the Sahara. The babban-riga/boubou or kulwu was often paired with a large turban that covered the entire face, save for the eyes, known as alasho in Hausa, tagelmust in Tuareg, or litham in Arabic. The nobility of 12th and 13th-century Mali, the 14th century Hausa Bakwai and Songhai Empires, then adopted this garment as a status symbol, as opposed to the traditional sleeveless or short-sleeved smocks (nowadays known as dashiki or Ghanaian smocks) worn by ordinary people/non-royals, or the Senegalese kaftan, a variant of the Arab thawb. Its use became widespread among West African Muslims with the migration of Kanuri, Hausa, Fulani and Dyula long-distance traders and Kanuri Islamic preachers in and around Muslim regions of West Africa in the 1400s. It spread even more rapidly in less-Islamized areas after the Fulani Jihads of the 19th century and French and British colonization.

== Variation ==
The boubou while generally a formal garment, is also considered appropriate for more casual situations. age, class, and gender do not bar individuals from wearing a boubou. The difference in how formal a boubou is perceived often lies in differences in local tradition and perceptions of the particular region one is examining. A Boubou is often decorated with intricate embroidery and is worn in a formal context on religious or ceremonial occasions. Boubous are often constructed from cotton damask fabric called bazin, or otherwise cotton fabric.

The Yoruba agbada is similar but distinct from the babaringa and grand boubou. The agbada is produced in various styles including with aso oke, lace, silk, etc. The tilbi is a variation of the boubou that is popular in French West Africa. This garment is identified by its intricate embroidery, and is often associated with both Muslim religious practices and marriage traditions. Another boubou variation is that of the Deraa, present in Mauritanian and Western Saharan area. The Deraa is used to indicate Moore ethnic identity by its coloration – Moore men signal their identity by wearing either deraa of white or various shades of blue color. The deraa also features gold embroidery overtop of the dyed bazin base.

The grand boubou is more explicitly formal wear than the previously mentioned boubou variations. The grand boubou often features brightly dyed fabric and detailed embroidery. It is associated with Muslim identity as well as an identity relating to Northwest and West Africa. Most traditionally the grand boubou is worn over loose trousers and a caftan.

In some regions of West Africa, the female formal clothing has a boubou variant, called a kaftan or Caftan. Sub-Saharan Mauritanian women wear Caftan boubous which are often ornamented through resist dye techniques. Grand boubous can be worn by both men and women.

== Popularity ==
The boubou was historically the attire of various Islamised Sahelian and Saharan peoples of West Africa, Especially among Kanuri people, but through increased trade and the spread of Islam throughout the region, it gained use among peoples in the savanna and forested regions of West Africa. Through this, the boubou was worn by chiefs of the Songhai of Niger and Mali, Kanuri, Hausa, Dagomba of Ghana, the Mandinka of the Gambia, the Susu of Guinea and the Temnes of Sierra Leone.

Boubou is viewed as fashionable attire among people in West Africa, the African diaspora, and very recently, even among Bantu people in East, Southern, and Central Africa.

== See also ==
- Agbada
- Dashiki
- Aso Oke hat
