= Alasho =

Indigenous Hausa long turban, worn across the head and neck

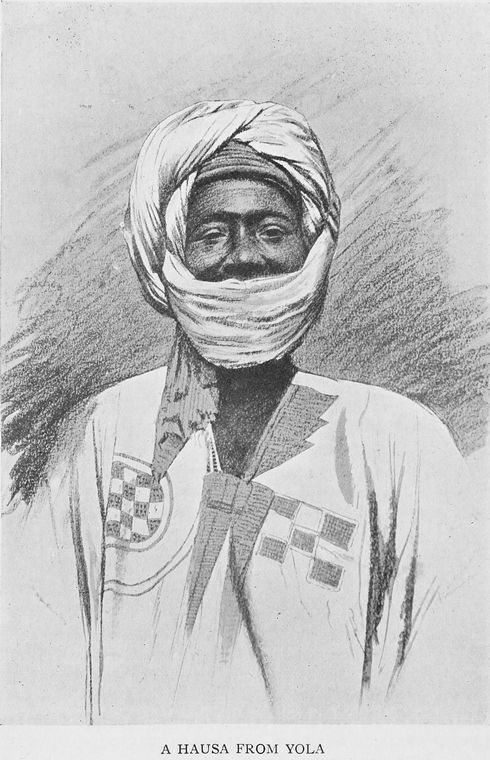
A 1902 drawing of a Hausa man from Yola in an Alasho

Alasho is an indigenous Hausa long turban, worn across the head and neck. It is near identical in length, colour and dimensions to that of the Tuareg tagelmust, but is wrapped differently to the Tuareg method, leaving the sides of the head and some of the lower neck free. A similar style turban is worn by Songhai men, known as 'fatalaa' in Zarma.

Once common throughout Hausa society as common male clothing, today it only survives when used for important occasions or ceremonies, rite of passage rituals to the adult age, marriage or in the inauguration of a social leader. The Alasho veil has traditionally been manufactured in Kano, and was sold to Tuareg and Songhay clients and traders.

== See also ==
- Litham, worn by Tuareg men
- Pandama, worn by Mandaean men
