= Dashiki =

Colorful men's garment widely worn in West Africa that covers the top half of the body

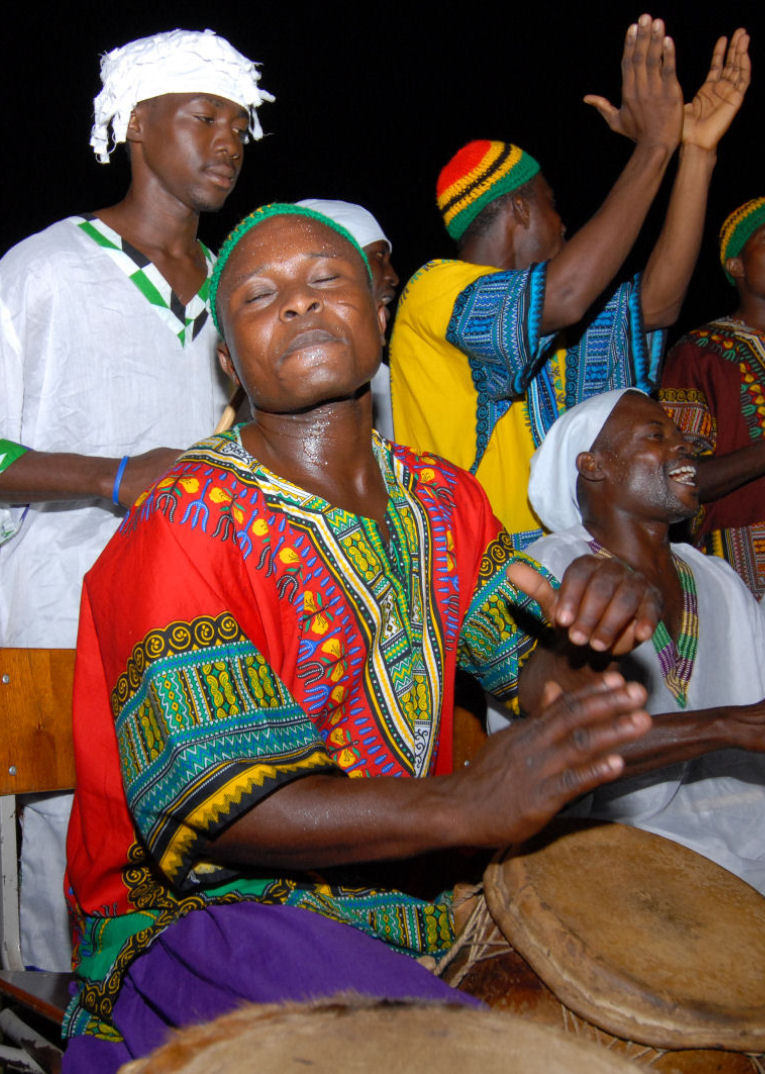
A musician in Ghana, dressed in a dashiki

The dashiki (/dəˈʃiːki, dɑː-/, də-SHEE-kee, dah-) is a colorful garment that covers the top half of the body, worn mostly in West Africa. It has formal and informal versions and varies from simple draped clothing to fully tailored suits. A common form is a loose-fitting pullover garment, with an ornate V-shaped collar, and tailored and embroidered neck and sleeve lines. It is frequently worn with a brimless kufi cap (which is worn in Islamic communities in Africa and the African diaspora) and pants. It has been popularized and claimed by communities in the African diaspora, especially African Americans.

The now trademark dashiki design was born from a wax print pattern by Dutch designer Toon van de Mannaker for Netherlands-based Vlisco. Van de Mannaker's print pattern was inspired by the silk embroidered tunics worn by Christian Ethiopian noblewomen in the 19th century. The pattern became known as the Angelina pattern in the West African market after the release of Ghanaian highlife hit song "Angelina" by The Sweet Talks. In Congo it is known as Miriam Makeba or Ya Mado: Miriam Makeba was a South African musician who often wore wax prints; "Ya mado!" is a memorable lyric from Fabregas's song "Mascara", which features dancers wearing dashikis in its music video.

The word "dashiki" comes from dàńṣíkí, a Yoruba loanword from the Hausa dan ciki, literally meaning 'shirt' or 'inner garment' (as compared to the outer garment, babariga).

== Versions ==
The informal version of the dashiki is a traditional print or embroidered dashiki. Three formal versions exist. The first type consists of a dashiki, sokoto (drawstring pants), and a matching kufi. This style is called a dashiki suit or dashiki trouser set and it is the attire worn by most grooms during wedding ceremonies. The second version consists of an ankle-length shirt, matching kufi, and sokoto and is called a Senegalese kaftan. The third type consists of a dashiki and matching trousers. A flowing gown is worn over these. This type is called a grand boubou or an agbada.

There are several different styles of dashiki suits available from clothing stores. The type of shirt included in the set determines the name. The traditional dashiki suit includes a thigh-length shirt. The short sleeve, traditional style is preferred by purists. A long dashiki suit includes a shirt that is knee-length or longer. However, if the shirt reaches the ankles, it is a Senegalese kaftan. Finally, the lace dashiki suit includes a shirt made of lace. A hybrid of the dashiki and kaftan worn by females is a traditional male dashiki with a western skirt.

=== Wedding colors ===
Grey is the traditional color for some West African weddings. Some grooms wear white dashiki suits during wedding ceremonies. Some couples wear non-traditional colors. The most common non-traditional colors are purple and blue.

- Purple and lavender: the color of African royalty.
- Blue: the color of love, peace, and harmony.

=== Funeral colors ===
Black and red are the traditional colors of mourning.

== In the United States ==
The dashiki found a market in America during the Civil Rights and Black Power movements. The term dashiki began appearing in print at least as early as 1967. Reporting on the 1967 Newark riots in the Amsterdam News on July 22, 1967, George Barner refers to a new African garment called a "danshiki". An article by Faith Berry in The New York Times Magazine includes it on July 7, 1968. Dashiki formally appeared in the Webster's New World Dictionary, 1st College Edition of 1970/72. It cites J. Benning with the first written usage of the word in 1967. J. Benning, M. Clarke, H. Davis and W. Smith were founders of New Breed of Harlem in Manhattan, New York City, the first manufacturer of the garment in the United States.

The dashiki was featured in the movies Uptight (1968), Putney Swope (1969), and the weekly television series Soul Train (1971). The Sanford and Son episode "Lamont Goes African" features Sanford's son Lamont wearing a dashiki as part of his attempt to return to his African roots. Jim Brown, Wilt Chamberlain, Sammy Davis Jr., and Bill Russell were among the well-known African-American athletes and entertainers who wore the dashiki on talk shows. Hippies also adopted dashikis into their wardrobe as a means to express counterculture values. Former District of Columbia mayor and council member Marion Barry was known for wearing a dashiki leading up to elections. Dashikis have been seen on many musicians, rappers and singers, mostly African Americans, including Beyoncé, Rihanna, Chris Brown, Wiz Khalifa, ScHoolboy Q, Q-Tip, and many others.

Fred Hampton of the Black Panther Party made note of black business owners wearing dashikis in his 1969 speech "Power Anywhere Where There's People": "[A]nybody who comes into the community to make profit off the people by exploiting them can be defined as a capitalist. And we don't care how many programs they have, how long a dashiki they have. Because political power does not flow from the sleeve of a dashiki; political power flows from the barrel of a gun."

In February 2023, freshman lawmaker Justin J. Pearson was inaugurated to the Tennessee House of Representatives while wearing a dashiki, prompting an immediate backlash from conservative lawmakers. The Tennessee House GOP tweeted that Pearson "should explore a different career opportunity" and referenced undefined attire rules for the house.

== See also ==
- Habesha kemis
- National costume
- African textiles
- Tunic
- Kitenge
