= Gomesi =

Traditional Ugandan garment

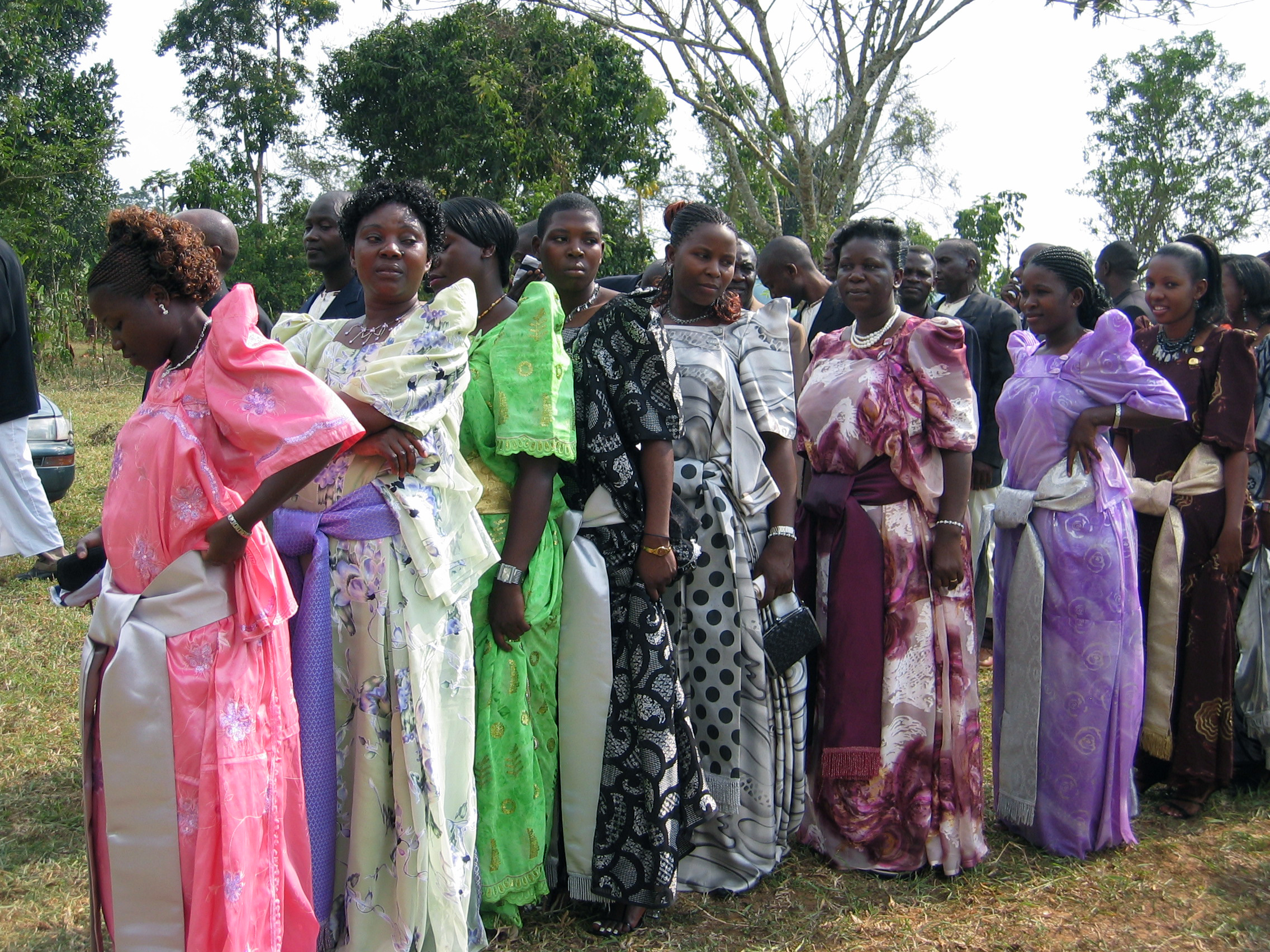
Women wearing Gomesi at a wedding in Kampala, Uganda.

A gomesi, also known as a Busuuti or Bodingi, is a colorful floor-length dress. It is the most commonly used costume for women in Buganda and Busoga. The Gomesi is considered the traditional dress of Baganda and Basoga women. Traditional male attire is the kanzu. The gomesi has had many changes in its uses and design since its origination.

== Origins ==
The best scholarship traces the origins of the Gomesi to 1905. The dress was introduced by a Goan designer, Caetano Gomes, then resident in Uganda which was a British Protectorate at the time. The dress did not gain wide use until the wife of Daudi Cwa II of Buganda, the Kabaka, or king over Buganda, wore it at her 18-year-old husband's official coronation (he had been kabaka since age 1) in 1914.

The gomesi can also be traced back to the former, traditional style of clothing in Uganda called Lubugo, originating in 600 AD. The women of Uganda adopted the gomesi once in was introduced by Europeans. The implementation of the gomesi can now serve as traditional, formal, and everyday clothing. When the gomesi is worn as causal clothing, it is usually one made of lighter weight and less formal fabrics.

This article of clothing has gone through four main stages of evolution, with changes in material and decorative style, starting in the 1960s. The gomesi originated as bark-cloth, and then developed into a cotton gomesi in the 1960s. By the 1970s, it transformed into a Khadi gomesi, and most recently a kikooyi gomesi.

== Design ==
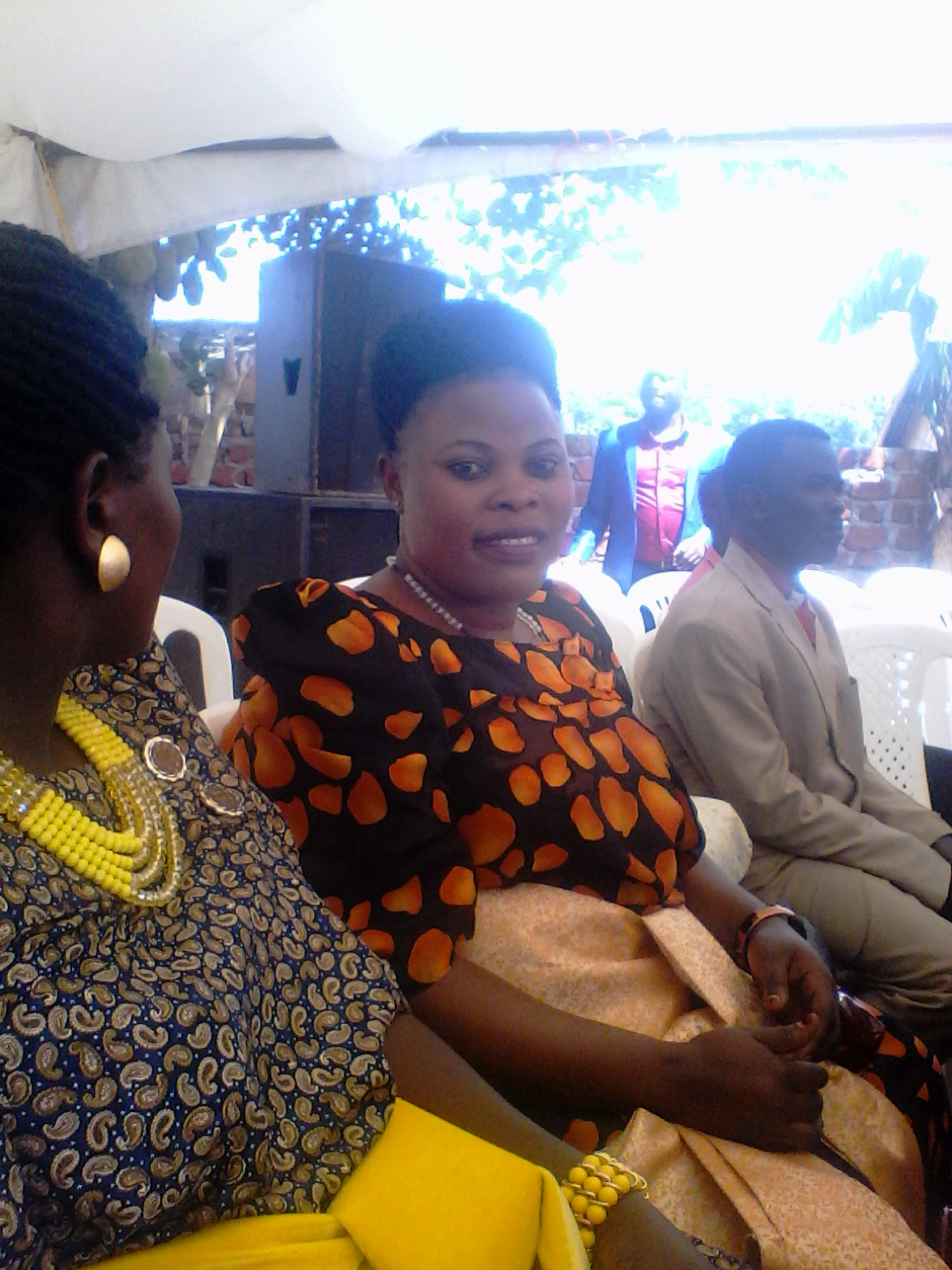
Ugandan women wearing the gomesi.

The gomesi is a floor-length, brightly colored cloth dress with a square neckline and short, puffed sleeves. The dress is tied with a sash (Kitambaala in Luganda) placed below the waist over the hips. The gomesi has two buttons on the left side of the neckline. Most gomesi are made of silk, cotton, satin, polyester, or linen fabric, with silk being the most expensive. The gomesi is often made of bright, colorful fabrics with the addition of shoulder pads. A kikooyi or kanga is tied underneath the linen gomesi to ensure that the fabric does not stick to the body. This fabric sash is typically 3 to 4 meters long, and it helps hold the outfit together while defining the women's feminine shape. A well-made Gomesi can require up to six metres of cloth.

The gomesi can be worn for any occasion, and in the rural areas it's the form of daily dress. Residents of cities and urban areas tend to wear it on special occasions such as funerals, and weddings. The gomesi is worn at wedding ceremonies during the introduction, also known as the Kwanjula. During the Kwanjula, all female members of the groom's family are required to appear dressed in Gomesi. Other times a gomesi may be worn include church functions, marriage betrothals, national formal events, and events where dignitaries are present.

== See also ==
- Kanzu
- Folk costume
