= Thawb =

Long-sleeved Middle Eastern robe

Thawb ثَوْب
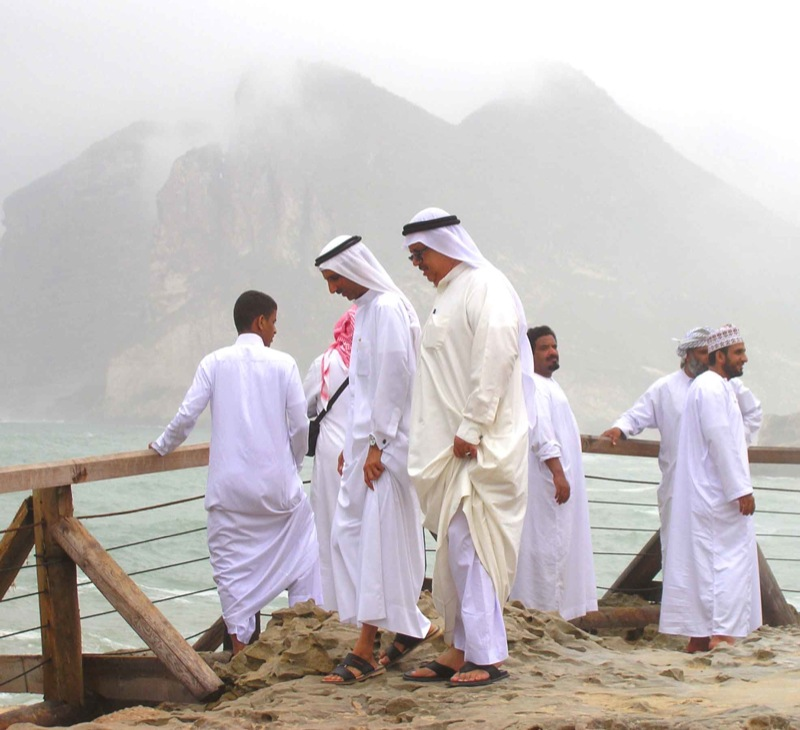
- Arab men wearing thobes in Salalah, Oman, 2006
- Type: Robe
- Material: Polyester fabric, wool or cotton
- Place of origin: Arabian Peninsula, Levant, North Africa

A thawb, (Note: alternatively spelled thobe, thaub, or thob) (Note: Arabic: ثَوْب, lit. 'garment'; IPA: [θawb]) also known as a dishdashah (Note: Arabic: دِشْدَاشَة; IPA: [diʃdaːʃa]) or a kandura (Note: Arabic: كَنْدُورَة; IPA: [kanduːra]) in other varieties of Arabic, is a garment traditionally worn by men in the Arab world. It is a long-sleeved, ankle-length robe that has regional variations in name and style. It can be worn in formal or informal settings, depending on the social and cultural norms in question; thawbs are the main formal attire for men in Saudi Arabia. Outside of the Arab world, the garment has been adopted in a number of Muslim-majority areas, particularly in the Indian subcontinent, where it is commonly referred to as a jubbah and is frequently worn by those who regard it as sunnah (i.e., something practised, spoken, or observed by Muhammad, the founding Islamic prophet) due to its modest appearance.

== Etymology ==
The word thawb (ثَوْب) is a Standard Arabic word for "dress" or "garment". It is also romanized as thobe or thaub or thob.

=== Name by locality ===
Region/country	Language	Main
Saudi Arabia, Yemen, Bahrain, Qatar, Palestine	Hejazi Arabic, Yemeni Arabic, Najdi Arabic, Bahraini Arabic, Palestinian Arabic	Thawb/Thōb (ثوب)
Levant, Iraq, Kuwait, Oman, Khuzestan, Yemen (Hadhramaut)	Hadhrami Arabic, Levantine Arabic, Mesopotamian Arabic, Omani Arabic, Kuwaiti Arabic, Ahvazi Arabic	Dishdashah (دِشْدَاشَة)
United Arab Emirates, Morocco, Algeria, Tunisia, Libya, Southeast Asia	Emirati Arabic, Moroccan Arabic, Algerian Arabic, Tunisian Arabic, Libyan Arabic	Kandūrah (كَنْدُورَة)/ Gandūrah (قَنْدُورَة)

== Regional variations ==
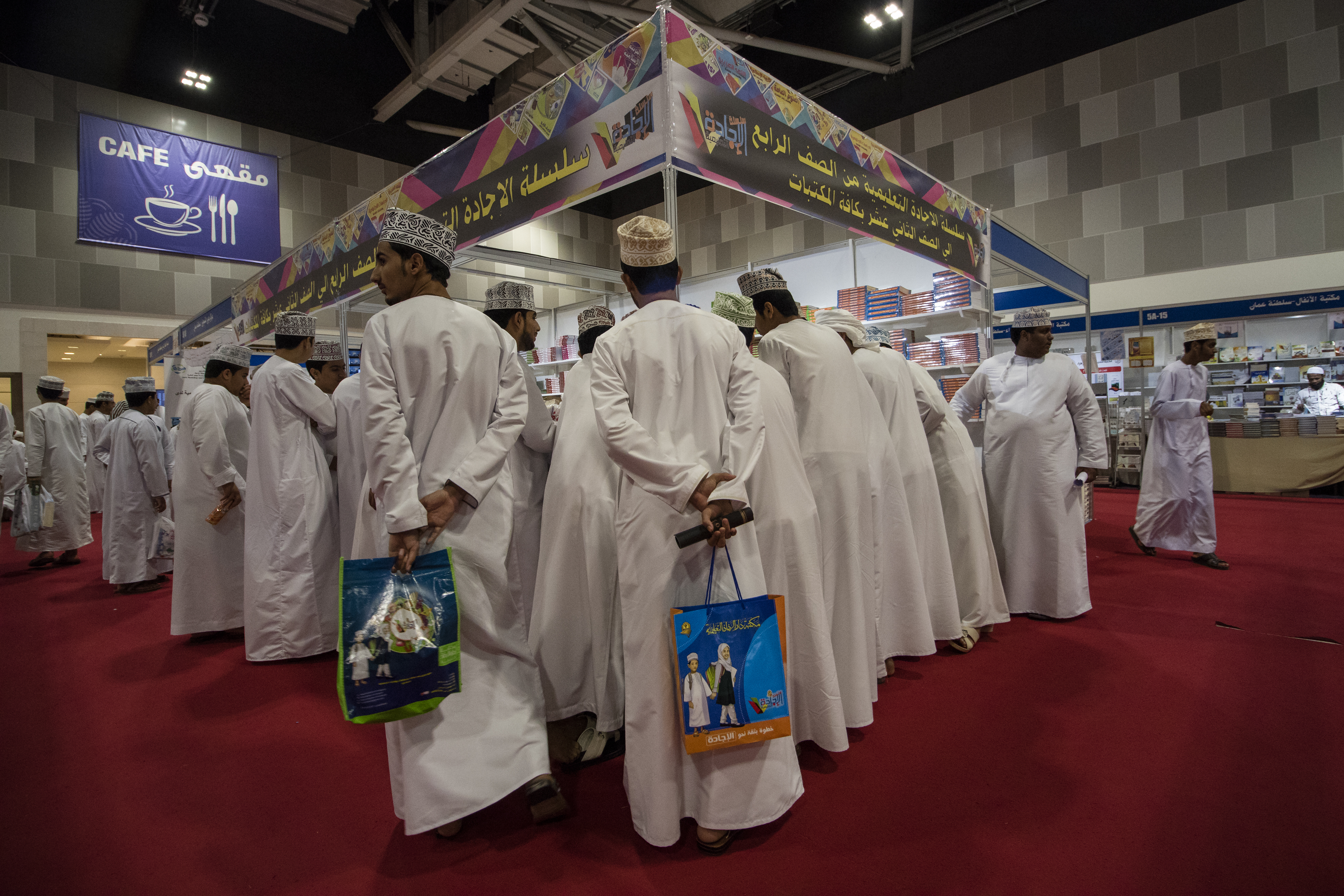
Omani men wearing dishdashas at the Muscat International Book Fair, 2017

The thawb is commonly worn by men in the Arabian Peninsula. It is normally made with polyester fabric, but heavier materials such as sheep's wool can also be used, especially in colder climates in the Levant. The style of the thawb varies between regions. In Iraq, Kuwait, the Levant, and Oman, dishdashah is the most common word for the garment; in the United Arab Emirates and the Maghreb, the word kandura is used. In Pakistan and other parts of the sub-continent, it is often to referred to as a 'Jubbah' and designed in an ornate style in keeping with local traditions.

=== Arabian Peninsula ===
In the Arabian Peninsula, thobes (thawb) are typically made with white or beige polymer fabric, with coloured wool thobes worn in the winter months. Thobes are commonly worn by men and are considered symbols of national and cultural identity, and are appropriate attire for formal occasions and religious ceremonies. In recent years, the thobes have become a popular fashion item, with many fashion designers adding their own modern twists to the traditional garment.

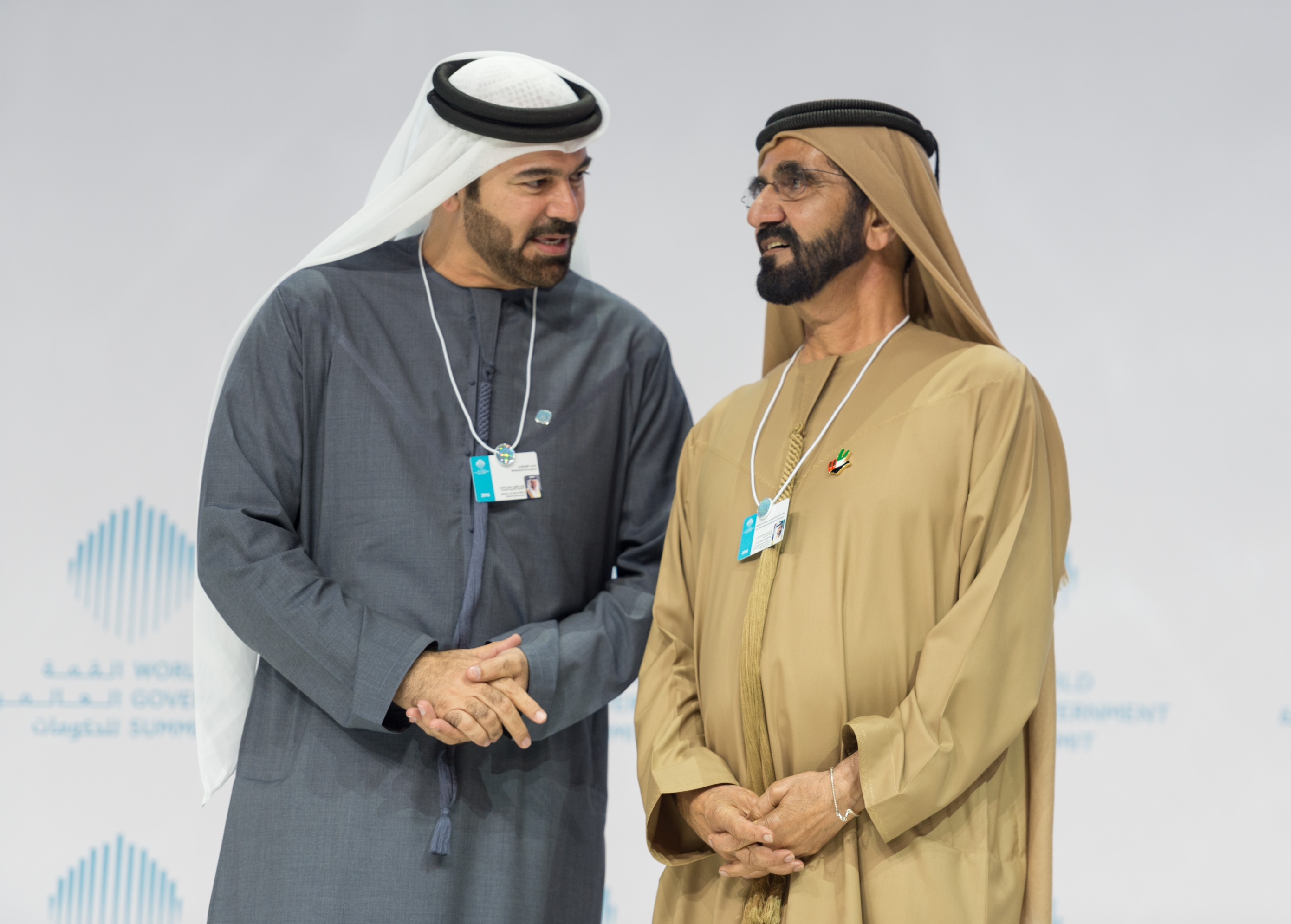
Sheikh Mohammed bin Rashid wearing a winter kandura

Thawb sleeves and collars can be stiffened to give a more formal appearance, front pockets and embroidery could be added, and placket buttons can be covered, exposed, or replaced by zippers. In the UAE and Oman, men's thobes have no collar, use frog closures as placket fasteners, and include tassels; in Oman, tassels tend to be short, and in the UAE tassels extend to the waist.

== Cultural significance ==
A thawb is sometimes worn with a bisht (بِشْت), also known in other parts of the Arabian Peninsula as a mishlah (مِشْلَح) or ʿabāʾ (عَبَاء), meaning 'cloak'. It is usually worn on ceremonial occasions or by officials. A bisht is usually worn by religious clergy, but can also be worn at weddings, Eids, and funerals. It may indicate wealth and royalty or sometimes a religious position. It was originally manufactured in Syria, Iraq, and Jordan, and it is usually worn in the Arabian Peninsula, Jordan, Syria, and parts of southern Iraq.

The Chinese Du Huan, who visited the Islamic world between 751 and 762 provides an interesting comparison of the classical Arab thawb to confucian robes:

人多魁梧，衣裳寬大，有似儒服。

The people are large in stature, and ther clothing is voluminous, somewhat resembling the gown of a Confiucian scholar (Shenyi)

— Tongdian,Volume 193

== See also ==
- Jellabiya
- Palestinian thobe
- Sudanese thobe
