= Amhara people =

Semitic-speaking ethnic group in Ethiopia

Amharas
አማራ (Amharic) ዐምሐራ (Ge'ez)
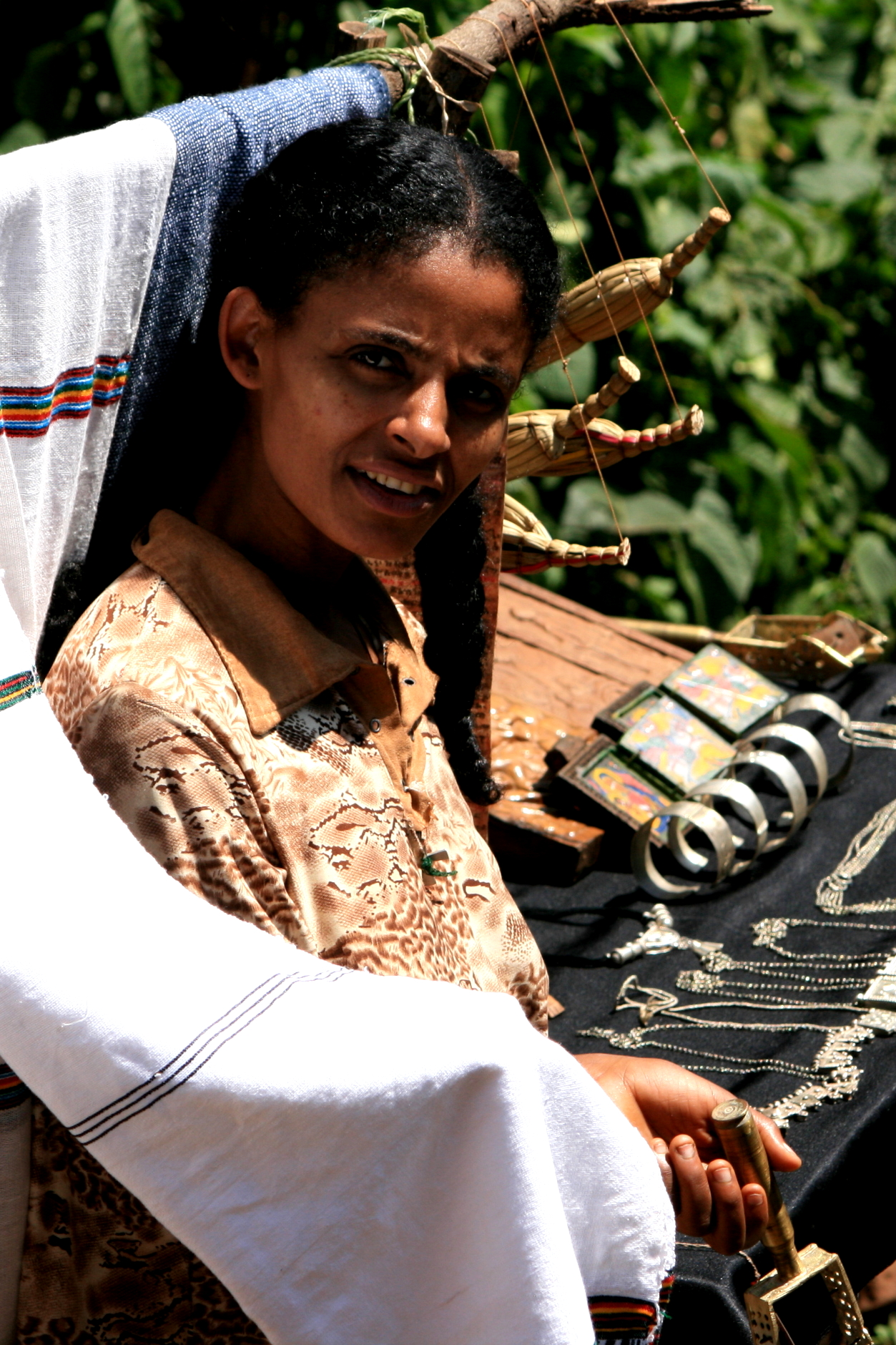
- Woman selling traditional souvenirs. Behind her, the traditional cloth, the Gabi scarf. Bahir Dar near Lake Tana in the Amhara Region of Ethiopia.

Regions with significant populations
- Ethiopia: 19,867,817 (2007)
- United States: 248,199
- Canada: 30,395
- United Kingdom: 8,620
- Australia: 4,515
- Finland: 1,515

Languages
- Amharic

Religion
- Significant Majority: Oriental Orthodox Christianity(82-85%); Minority: Judaism(0.5%) • Islam(15%) • Others(2-3%)

Related ethnic groups
- Habesha (Tigrinya, Tigrayan) • Agaw • Argobba • Beta Israel • Gurage • Zay • other Ethiosemitic

Amharas (Amharic: አማራ, romanized: Āmara; Ge'ez: ዐምሐራ, romanized: ʾÄməḥära) are a Semitic-speaking predominantly Orthodox Christian ethnic group native to the north and central highlands of Ethiopia.

Their ancestral land lies in the historic provinces of Bete Amhara, Gojjam, Gondar (formerly known as Begmder), Simien, Lasta, Wegera, Angot, Dembiya, and the Shewa province. These regions are a part of the Amhara Region under the current government. Their language, Amharic, is the working language of Ethiopia and has been the lingua franca across the Ethiopian Empire for over 700 years. The Amhara historically served as the rulers and political nobility of the Ethiopian Empire.

The Amhara and neighboring groups in North and Central Ethiopia and Eritrea, more specifically the diaspora, refer to themselves as "Habesha" (Abyssinian) people.

== Origin ==
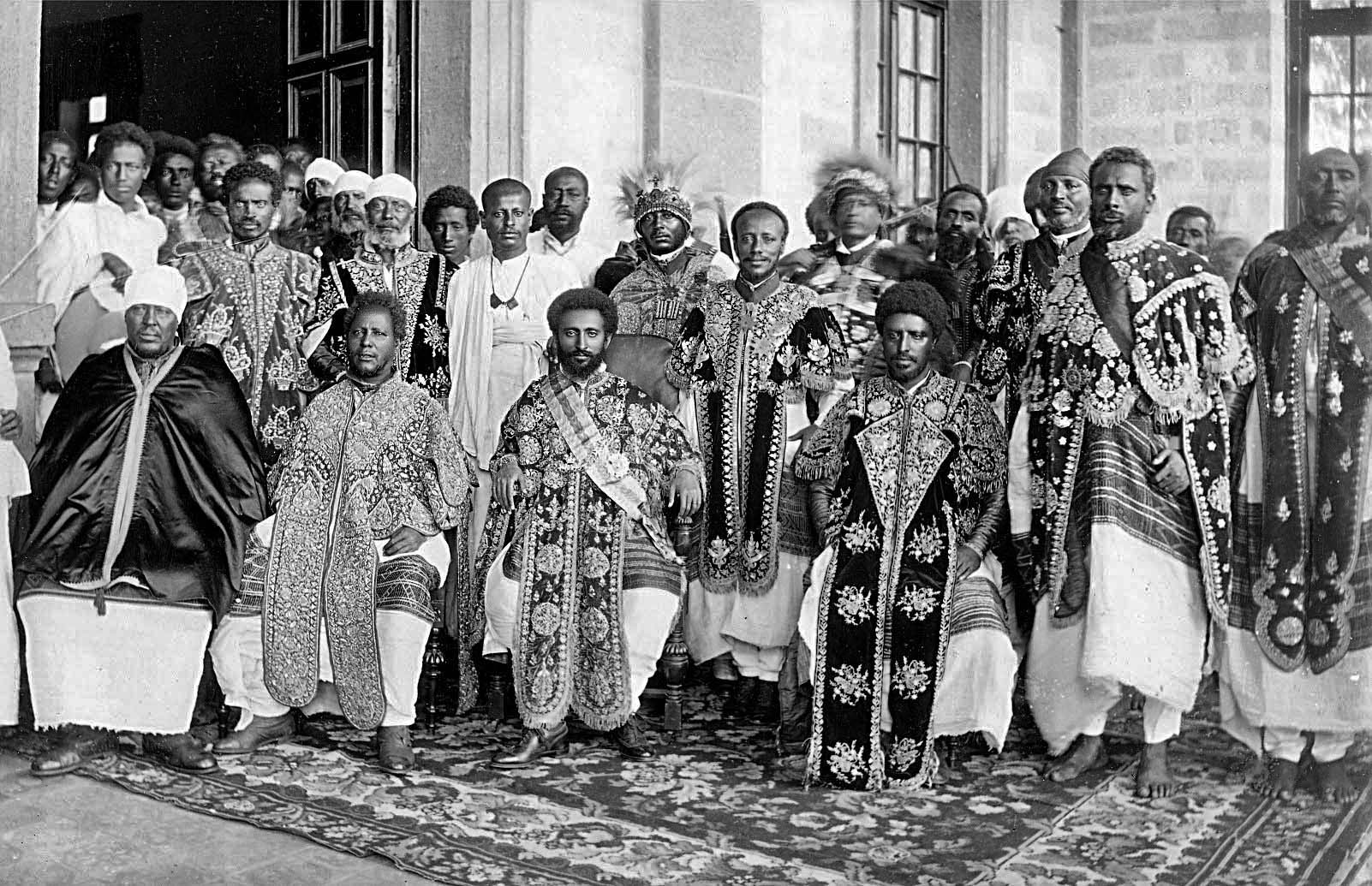
Emperor Haile Selassie I (center) Habte Giyorgis Dinagde Hailu Takla Haymanot and member of the royal court

=== Etymology and historical terminology ===
The name Amhara has a long tradition of interpretation in Ethiopian scholarship. It derives from Ge'ez ዐም (ʿam, "people") and ሐራ (ḥara, "free" or "soldier"). This ethnonym aligns with the later prominence the Amhara had in the Christian kingdom.

Among the earliest extants of the Amhara as a people, dates to the early 12th century in the middle of the Zagwe Dynasty, when the Amhara were recorded of being in conflict in the land of Wärjih in 1128 AD. The use of this terminology in medieval external sources is historically consistent. An early reference of the Amhara comes from the mid-12th century source by Umara al-Yamani, a Yemeni historian who notes that one of the rulers of the Najahid Dynasty, Surur al-Fatiki, belonged to the tribe of Amhara. He says "He of whom I speak was the noble Kaid Abu Muhammad Surur al-Fatiki. He belonged to the tribe of Amhara, and all I can relate of him is but as a drop in the sea of his great merits" A non-contemporary 13th or 14th century hagiographical source from Saint Tekle Haymanot traces Amhara even further back to the mid 9th century AD as a named location and a recognized territorial domain.

Medieval European cartography further agrees with the Arabic sources. The Italian (Venetian) cartographer Fra Mauro, notes a Regno Hamara or "Kingdom of Amhara" in his famous Mappomondo in 1460. Important information on Amhara is provided in the Historia Aethiopica by Hiob Ludolf, the data of which came from Abba Gorgoryos, himself a native of Amhara. On the map of Historia Aethiopica, Amhara is situated between the Abay River to the west, the Bashilo River in the north, the Afar Depression to the east and the Awash River to the south. The province consisted of much of Wollo and northern Shewa, and encompassed the region of Lake Hayq and the famous Istifanos Monastery. Cumulatively suggesting that within the Ethiopian Empire, Amhara had a higher position as a "kingdom" among provinces and was not limited in use as a toponym. The etymological definition is thus attested in Arabic, Ge'ez, Italian and Latin sources over five centuries and in all, highlighing the developing centre of power in the Ethiopian kingdom as Amhara.

=== Ethnogenesis ===
Amharic is a South Ethio-Semitic language, along with Gurage, Argobba and others. Some time before the 1st century AD, the North and South branches of Ethio-Semitic diverged. Due to the social stratification of the time, the Cushitic Agaw adopted the South Semitic language and mixed with the Semitic population. Amharic thus developed with a Cushitic substratum and a Semitic superstratum. The proto-Amhara, or the northernmost South Ethio-Semitic speakers, remained in constant contact with their North Ethio-Semitic neighbors, evidenced by linguistic analysis and oral traditions. A 7th century southward shift of the center of gravity of the Kingdom of Aksum and the ensuing integration and Christianization of the proto-Amhara also resulted in a high prevalence of Geʽez sourced lexicon in Amharic. By about the 9th century AD, there was a linguistically distinct ethnic group called the Amhara in the area of Bete Amhara.

== History ==
=== Aksumite Empire (1st - 10th century AD) ===
The Christianization of the Amhara people is believed to have begun somewhere during the Aksumite period. The political importance of Amhara further increased after the fall of Aksum, which marked the shift of the political center of the Christian Ethiopian state from Aksum in the north to the Zagwe region of Lasta further inland

The Aksumite Empire extended its religion, script, and administrative culture south of its imperial core in Aksum. While archaeological studies have historically spent over a century excavating the urban cores and stelae of Tigray and Eritrea, the territory within the Amhara Region has traditionally been given the status of an 'imperial frontier' and has been severely understudied. It is this neglect which overlooks the southward migration of Aksumite Christian elites, institutions, and agricultural populations into the Amhara Region as simply 'cultural myth'.

According to Karl Butzer "By 800, Axum had almost ceased to exist, and its demographic resources were barely adequate to stop the once tributary pastoralists of the border marches from pillaging the defenseless countryside." With some of the common people the Axumite elite abandoned Axum in favor of central Ethiopia. Christian families gradually migrated southward into Amhara and northern Shewa.

Hence, the Christian Ethiopian state had moved from Aksum into the Amhara plateau. The manuscript traditions of Lake Hayq and Dabra ʿAsbo in the Amhara region preserve these historical transitions and are evidence in light of the lack of archeological and historical discourse covering Aksumite civilisation in the Amhara region and its people.

=== Rise of Bete Amhara and the Early Solomonic Period (1270 - 1632) ===
Yekuno Amlak, a prince from Bete Amhara (lit: House of Amhara) established the Solomonic Dynasty in 1270 AD. The early rulers of the Solomonic Dynasty were referred to as the "kings of Amhara", as the founder, Yekuno Amlak, and their followers were called "Amhara". It was in his reign that the adoption of Amharic became the lingua franca of the empire. The sources connected with his reign, notably the Gännätä Maryam inscription and portrait of Yekuno Amlak, place the new dynasty firmly in the Amhara Region.

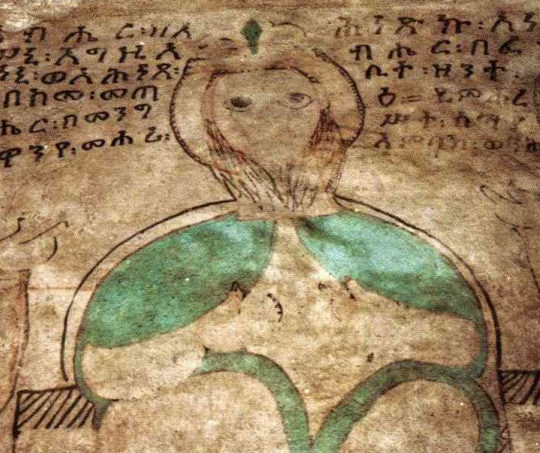
Portrait of Yekuno Amlak, an ethnic Amhara and founder of the Solomonic Dynasty. (Geneta Mariam Church in Lalibela, late 13th century)

Medieval Arab historians state that Christian Ethiopia was under the sovereignty of "the Lord of Amhara" which confirms that the new Solomonic dynasty appeared to be of the Amhara people in the eyes of its contemporaries. The Egyptian historian al-Mufaddal ibn Abi al-Fada'il in 704 Hijri (1304-1305 AD) labelled the Emperor of Abyssinia as al-Malik al-Amhari or "the Amhara King." In 1436 Ibn Taghribirdi wrote a passage about the death of Emperor Yeshaq referring to him as the lord of Amhara, "The Hatse, the Abyssinian king, the infidel and the Lord of the Amhara in Abyssinia died (in this year). His estates were much enlarged after wars waged and led by him against Sultan Sa'ad ad-Din, the Lord of the Jabarta." The 14th century Syrian historian, Al-Umari, recorded that the Ifat Sultanate as well as all the other Muslim principalities in the region, were under the authority of the "King of Amhara" who collected tribute from them and appointed their sultans. In the early 15th century Egyptian writer Al-Maqrizi details a number of revolts against Christian rule in the Sultanate of Ifat, which were subsequently crushed by "the Amhara".

==== Emperor Amda Seyon I and Amharic as the royal language ====
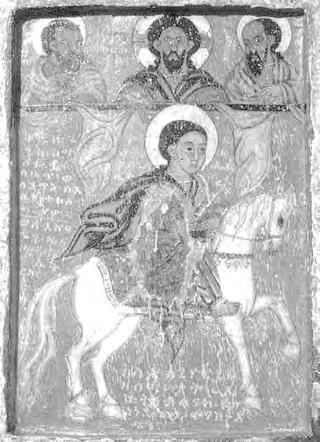
Amda Seyon I as depicted on a 15th-century manuscript

Under Amda Seyon I (r. 1314–1344) the Amhara kingdom expanded in every direction, with the boundaries of the Amhara kingdom being located in Bete Amhara, which corresponds to parts of the modern provinces of South Wollo and North Shewa. His campaigns subdued Ifat and the neighbouring Muslim principalities, which were made tributary to the "King of Amhara". The royal chronicle of his reign lists the provincial armies of Shewa, Damot, Gojjam, Bugna and Bete Amhara serving the crown. In the 1340s in the Masālik al-abṣār,Al-ʿUmarī describes the geography, administration and military of the Christian state as being held under Amda Seyon .

The oldest surviving written Amharic is found in the 'soldier songs' (Amharic: የወታደሮች መዝሙር), composed during the 14th-century reign of Emperor Amda Seyon I. The language of the Amhara enters the record as the written language of the court and dynasty during the 14th century.

==== The Kəbrä Nägäśt and Solomonic Mythology ====
The "Glory of the Kings" (Ge'ez: ክብረ ነገሥት, Romanized: Kəbrä Nägäśt), was compiled in the 14th century and was the founding document of the Solomonic dynasty's ideological legitimacy. Its primary narrative, was the lineage of Yekuno Amlak claims descent from Solomon and the Queen of Sheba through Menelik I, the transfer of the Ark of the Covenant to Ethiopia, and the election of Ethiopia as a new Zion. The Amhara monarchy made this narrative the basis of its mythological legitimacy and spread it through its Church and its chronicles. As a result, it elevated Amhara culture to the core of Ethiopian national identity, and the standard by which all future emperors were measured. It became the core of Ethiopian national and religious identity, and the standard by which every later emperor was measured.

==== Conquests against Muslim sultanates and Ethiopian Jews (14th - 15t centuries) ====
Emperor Amda Seyon's successors kept and extended the Amhara state. Between the late 14th and early 15th centuries, Emperor Dawit I (r. 1382–1413) held the imperial patronage of the Church and the various conquests against the Muslim sultanates. It was ultimately Emperor Yeshaq I in the 15th century who oversaw large campaigns against the Ifat and Adal Sultanates. He was contemporarily record as the "Lord of the Amhara" by Muslim onlookers whose estates were much enlarged by his wars against Sultan Saʿd ad-Dīn. Al-Maqrīzī likewise details a number of revolts against Christian rule in Ifat, crushed by "the Amhara".

===== Imperial centralisation under Emperor Zara Yaqob =====
Emperor Zara Yaqob is one of the more celebrated rulers of the early Solmonic Dynasty. Besides his religious devotion from which he resolved the theological Ewostatean controversy, he founded Däbrä Berhan in Shewa (Amhara province) in the 1450s from which he dictated it as his royal seat, and had the provincial administration and Church discipline reorganized across the empire. His reign marked the first stable capital of the dynasty, and gave the Amhara Christian state its settled shape.

==== Prominence of the Amhara province ====
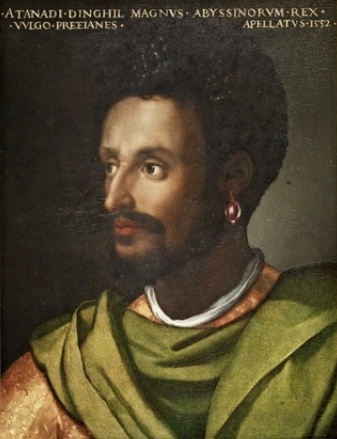
Emperor Lebna Dengel ruler of the Solomonic Dynasty (1508 - 1540), by Cristofano dell'Altissimo

In the pre-17th century, the Amhara region was regarded as the source of the state and the cradle of the monarchy. It stood highest among the provinces as a "kingdom", a status that Fra Mauro's map of 1460 records with its Regno Hamara. During the earliest formation of the dynasty, Amhara monarchs lived in mobile royal camps (katamas), showing a particular preference for the southern regions such as Shewa.

The Early Solomonic Period, forms a continuous record of the Amhara monarchy from 1314 to 1632. It covers the history from Emperor Amda Seyon I through to Emperor Susənyos (1607–1632), together with the Ser'ata Mengəst (Ge'ez: ሥርዓተ መንግሥት) a document which details the orders and rules of the imperial state. Together these texts document an Amhara-led state that ordered the highlands under one Church, one crown and one royal language of government.

==== Ethiopian-Adal War (1529 - 1543) ====
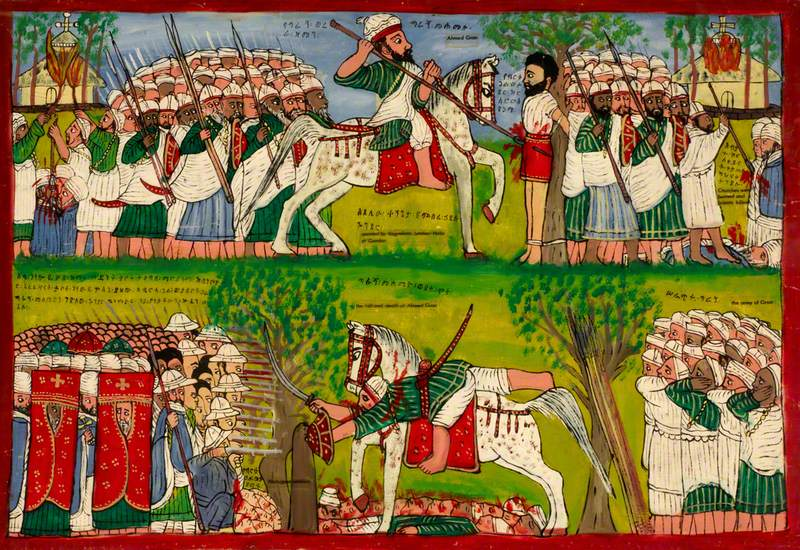
Early 20th century folk drawing of Cristóvão da Gama and Imam Ahmad's deaths.

In the early 16th century, Ahmad ibn Ibrahim al-Ghazi, Imam of the Adal Sultanate, overran much of the highlands. It was during this time the Amhara monarchy under Emperor Lebna Dengel and then Emperor Gälawdewos, held a series of campaigns in effort to hold the Christian dynasty together. With aid from the Portuguese, the state emerged victorious from the war preserving its territory, state, and importantly, its Christianhood. It is recorded in Gälawdewos's chronicle, as well as those of Minas and Sarsa Dengel, the following rebuilding of the Amhara state in the war's aftermath.

== Social stratification ==
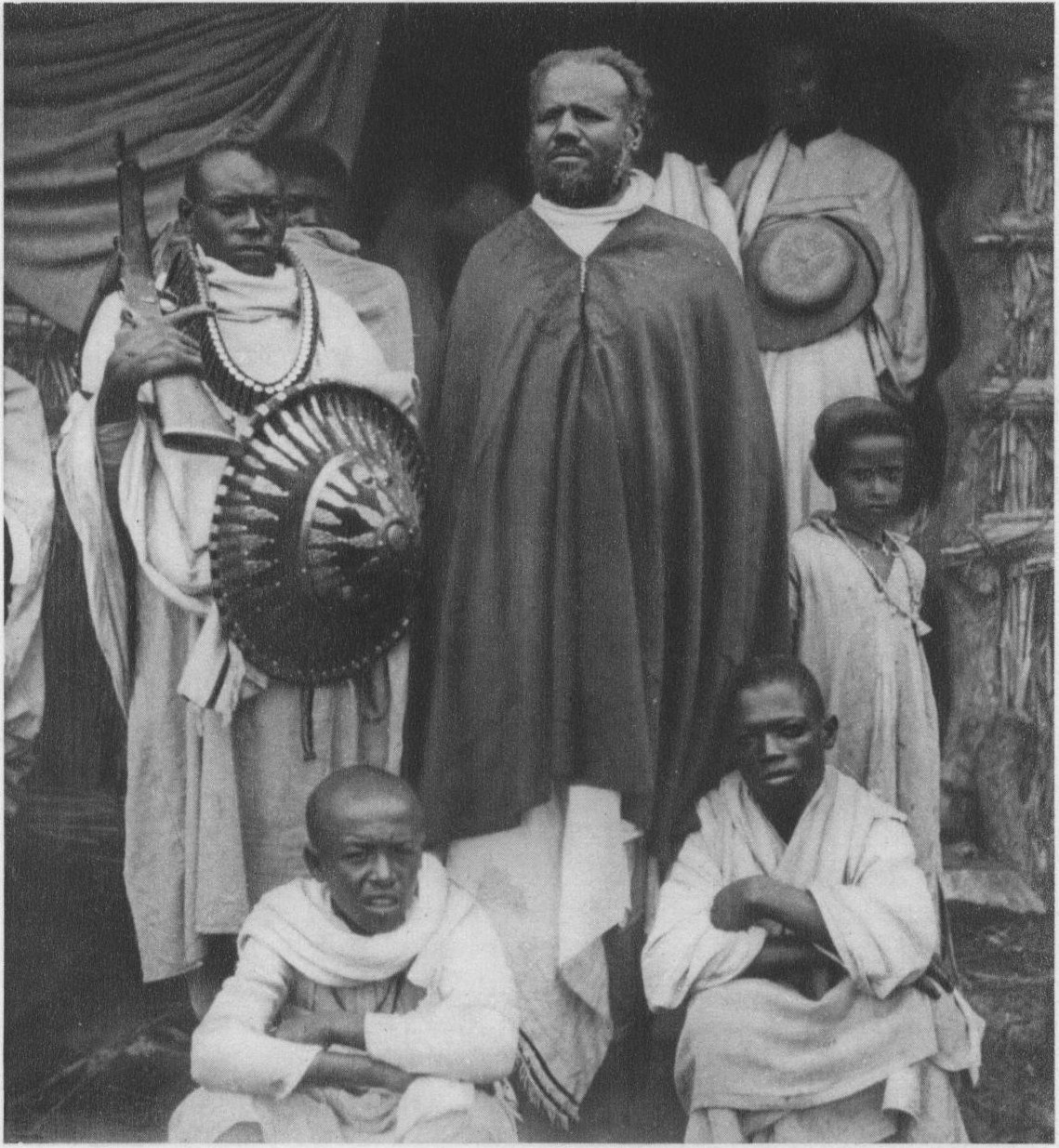
1921 photo captioned "Amhara head of the guard of the Negus."

Within traditional Amharic society and that of other local Afro-Asiatic-speaking populations, there were four basic strata. According to the Donald Levine, these consisted of high-ranking clans, low-ranking clans, caste groups (artisans), and slaves. Slaves or rather servants were at the bottom of the hierarchy, and were primarily drawn from the pagan Nilotic Shanqella and Oromo peoples.

Also known as the barya (meaning "slave" in Amharic), they were captured during slave raids in Ethiopia's southern hinterland. War captives were another source of slaves, but the perception, treatment and duties of these prisoners was markedly different. According to Levine, the widespread slavery in Greater Ethiopia formally ended in the 1930s, but former slaves, their offspring, and de facto slaves continued to hold similar positions in the social hierarchy. Oromo as "Galla," The Amhara, as the ruling people, enslaved other ethnic groups such as the Oromo people (historically referred to as Galla). The central Amhara provinces were a part of major slave caravan trade routes from the southern and southwestern regions to northern Ethiopia. According to Terence Walz and Kenneth M. Cuno, Ottoman-era court records indicate that it is improbable that Amhara, during the Ethiopian-Ottoman border conflict, were enslaved under the rule Ali Mubarak as they were who governed the Abyssinian highlands and whose warlords were one of many groups that habitually raided elsewhere for slaves. According to Gustav Arén, Ethiopian law did not prohibit slave-holding, but did forbid the enslavement of Christians. As such, George Arthur Lipsky indicates that the Amhara resisted converting the non-Christian ethnic groups to Christianity, because they could not thereafter be kept or sold as slaves. John Ralph Willis states that slave merchants avoided purchasing Christian Amhara or Tigrean slaves.

The separate Amhara caste system of people ranked higher than slaves was based on the following concepts: (1) endogamy, (2) hierarchical status, (3) restraints on commensality, (4) pollution concepts, (5) traditional occupation, and (6) inherited caste membership. Scholars accept that there has been a rigid, endogamous and occupationally closed social stratification among the Amharas and other Afro-Asiatic-speaking Ethiopian ethnic groups. Some label it as an economically closed, endogamous class system with occupational minorities, whereas others such as David Todd assert that this system can be unequivocally labelled as caste-based.

== Language ==
The Amhara speak "Amharic" ("Amarigna", "Amarinya") as their mother tongue. Its native speakers account for 29.3% of the Ethiopian population. It belongs to the Semitic branch of the Afro-Asiatic language family, and is the largest member of the Ethiopian Semitic group. As of 2018 it had more than 57 million speakers worldwide (32,345,260 native speakers plus 25,100,000 second language speakers), making it the most commonly-spoken language in Ethiopia in terms of first- and second-language speakers, and the second most spoken Semitic language after Arabic.

Amharic is a South Ethio-Semitic language, along with Gurage, Argobba and others. Some time before the 1st century AD, the North and South branches of Ethio-Semitic diverged. Due to the social stratification of the time, the Cushitic Agaw adopted the South Semitic language and mixed with the Semitic population. Amharic thus developed with a Cushitic substratum and a Semitic superstratum. The proto-Amhara, or the northernmost South Ethio-Semitic speakers, remained in constant contact with their North Ethio-Semitic neighbors, evidenced by linguistic analysis and oral traditions. A 7th century southward shift of the center of gravity of the Kingdom of Aksum and the ensuing integration and Christianization of the proto-Amhara also resulted in a high prevalence of Geʽez sourced lexicon in Amharic.

Most of the Ethiopian Jewish communities in Ethiopia and Israel speak Amharic. Many followers of the Rastafari movement learn Amharic as a second language, as they consider it to be a sacred language.

Amharic is the working language of the federal authorities of the Ethiopian government, and one of the five official languages of Ethiopia. It was for some time also the sole language of primary school instruction, but has been replaced in many areas by regional languages such as Oromo and Tigrinya. Nevertheless, Amharic is still widely used as the working language of Amhara Region, Benishangul-Gumuz Region, Gambela Region and Southern Nations, Nationalities, and Peoples' Region. The Amharic language is transcribed using a script (Fidal) which is slightly modified from the Ethiopic or Ge'ez script, an abugida.

== Religion ==
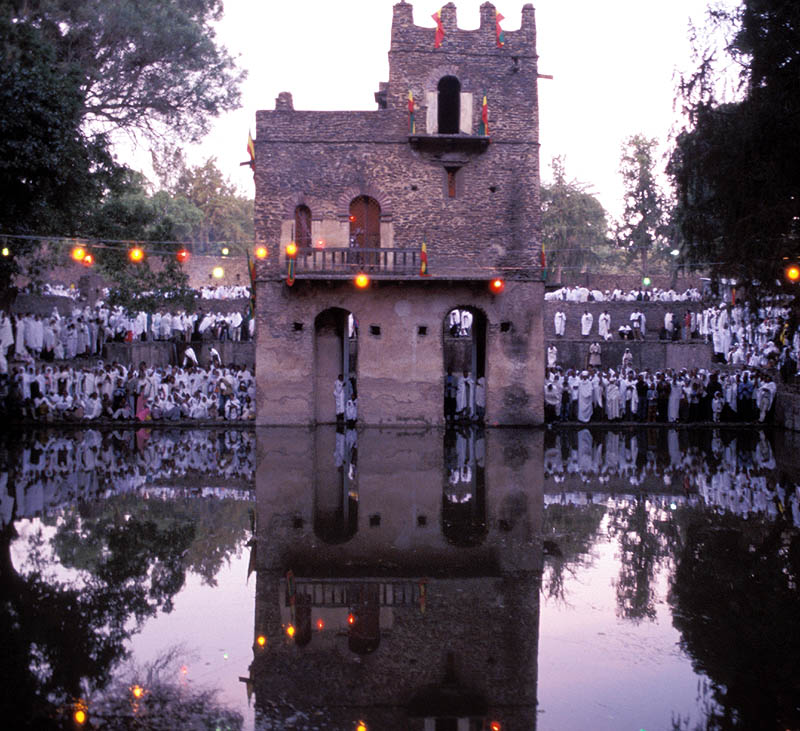
Crowds gather at the Fasilides' Bath in Gondar to celebrate Timkat – the Epiphany for the Ethiopian Orthodox Tewahedo Church.

For centuries, the predominant religion of the Amhara has been Christianity, with the Ethiopian Orthodox Tewahedo Church playing a central role in the culture of the country. According to the 2007 census, 82.5% of the population of the Amhara Region was Ethiopian Orthodox; 17.2% of it was Muslim, 0.2% of it was Protestant (see P'ent'ay) and 0.5% of it was Jewish (see Beta Israel).

The Ethiopian Orthodox Church maintains close links with the Coptic Orthodox Church of Alexandria. Easter and Epiphany are the most important celebrations, marked with services, feasting and dancing. There are also many feast days throughout the year, when only vegetables or fish may be eaten.

Marriages are often arranged, with men marrying in their late teens or early twenties. Traditionally, girls were married as young as 14, but in the 20th century, the minimum age was raised to 18, and this was enforced by the Imperial government. After a church wedding, divorce is frowned upon. Each family hosts a separate wedding feast after the wedding.

Upon childbirth, a priest will visit the family to bless the infant. The mother and child remain in the house for 40 days after birth for physical and emotional strength. The infant will be taken to the church for baptism at 40 days (for boys) or 80 days (for girls).

== Culture ==
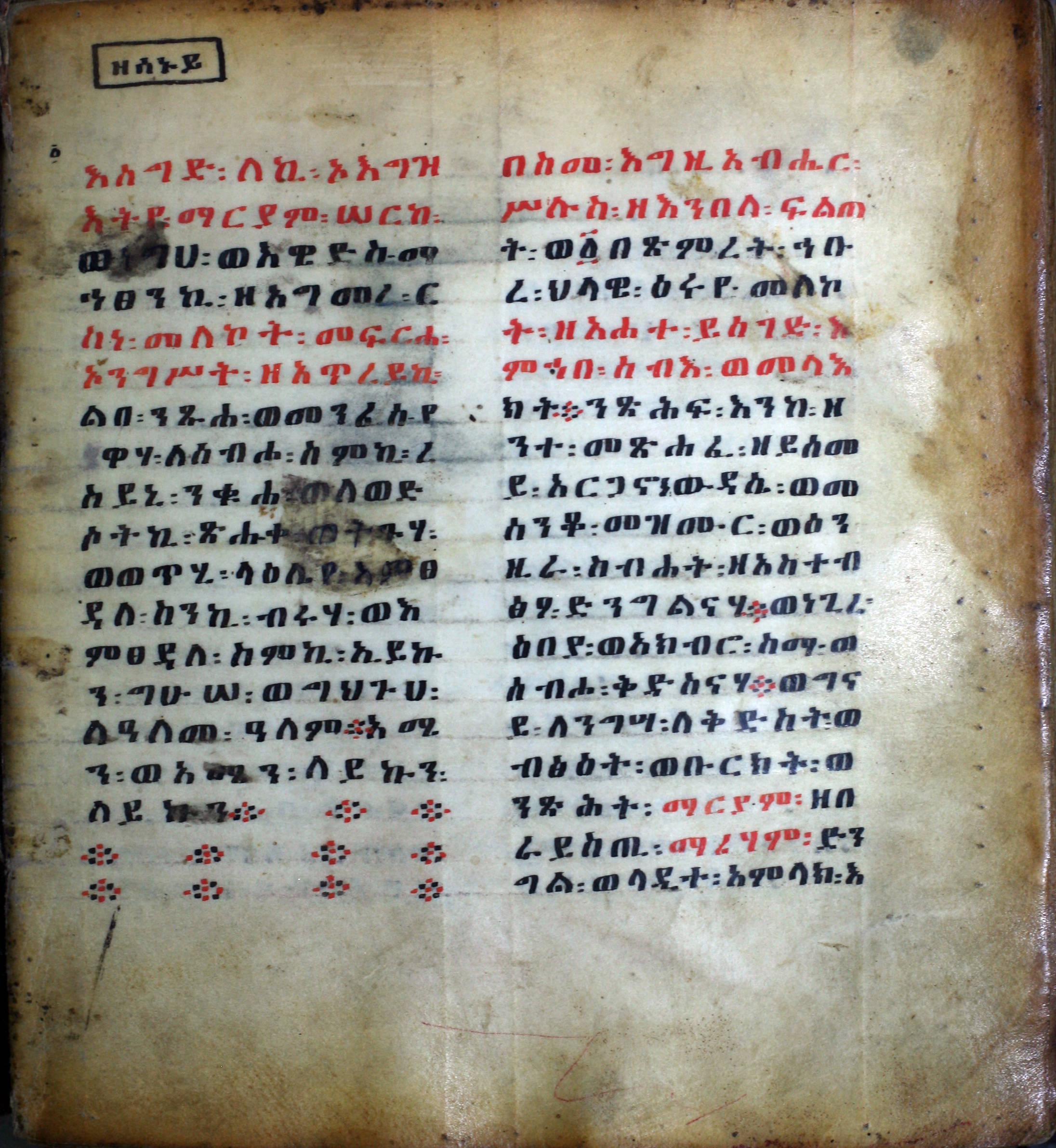
An example of Ge'ez taken from a 15th-century Ethiopian Coptic prayer book

=== Literature ===
Surviving Amharic literary works dates back to the 14th century, when songs and poems were composed. In the 17th century Amharic became the first African language to be translated into Latin when Ethiopian priest and lexicographer Abba Gorgoryos (1595–1658) in 1652 AD made a European voyage to Thuringia in Germany. Gorgoryos along with his colleague and friend Hiob Ludolf co-authored the earliest grammar book of the Amharic language, an Amharic-Latin dictionary, as well as contributing to Ludolf's book "A History of Ethiopia".

Modern literature in Amharic however, started two centuries later than in Europe, with the Amharic fiction novel Ləbb Wälläd Tarik, published in Rome in 1908, widely considered the first novel in Amharic, by Afäwarq Gäbrä Iyäsus. Amhara intellectual Tekle Hawariat Tekle Mariyam pioneered African and Ethiopian theatre when he authored Fabula: Yawreoch Commedia, Africa's first scripted play. Since then countless literature in Amharic has been published and many modern-day writers in Amharic translate their work into English for commercial reasons.

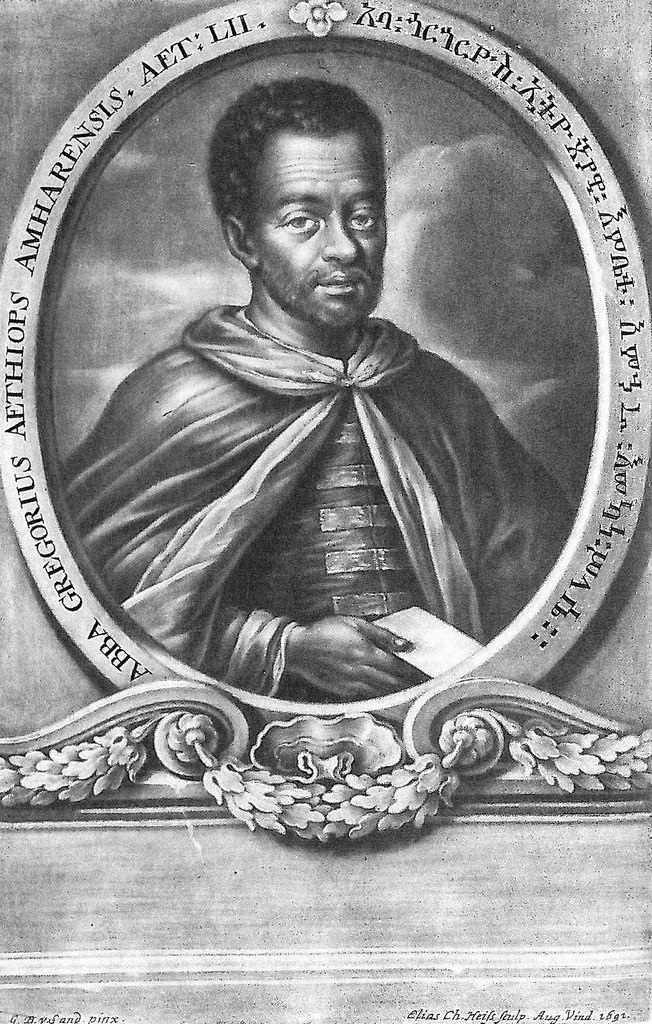
Abba Gorgoryos (1595–1658)

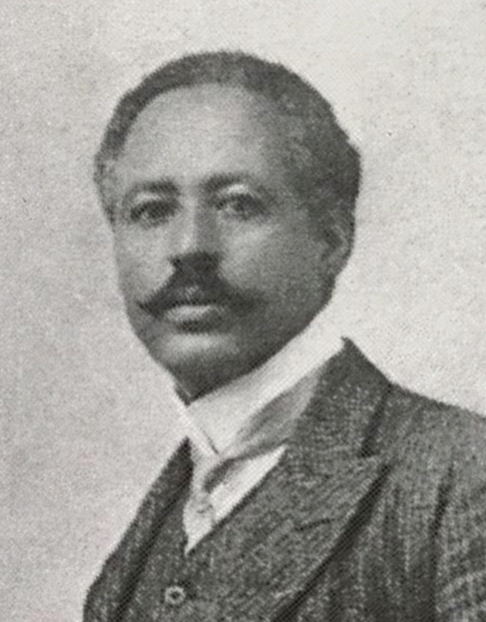
Afäwarq Gäbrä Iyäsus (1868–1947)

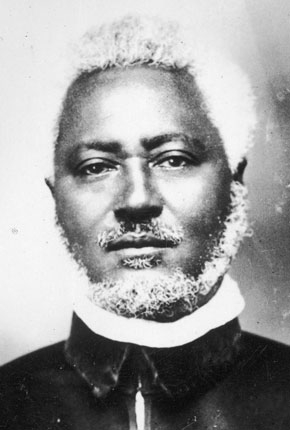
Heruy Wolde Selassie (1878–1938)

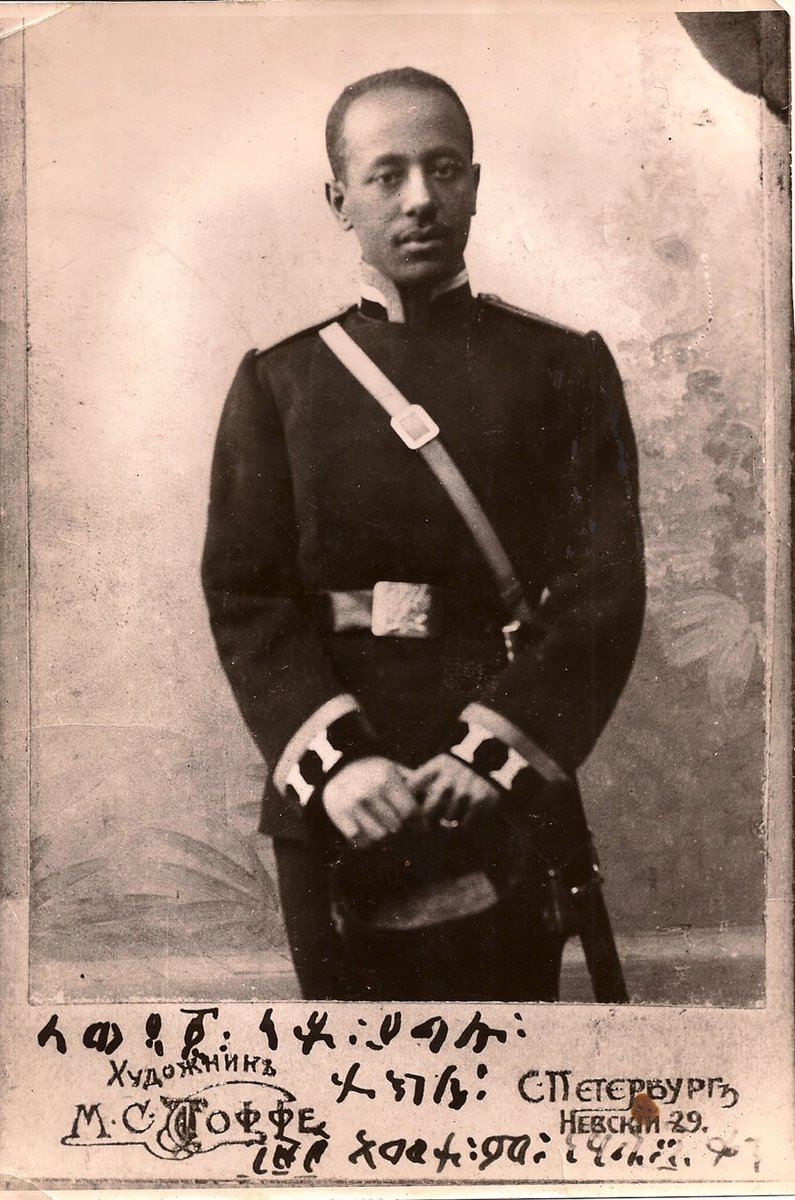
Tekle Hawariat Tekle Mariyam (1884–1977)

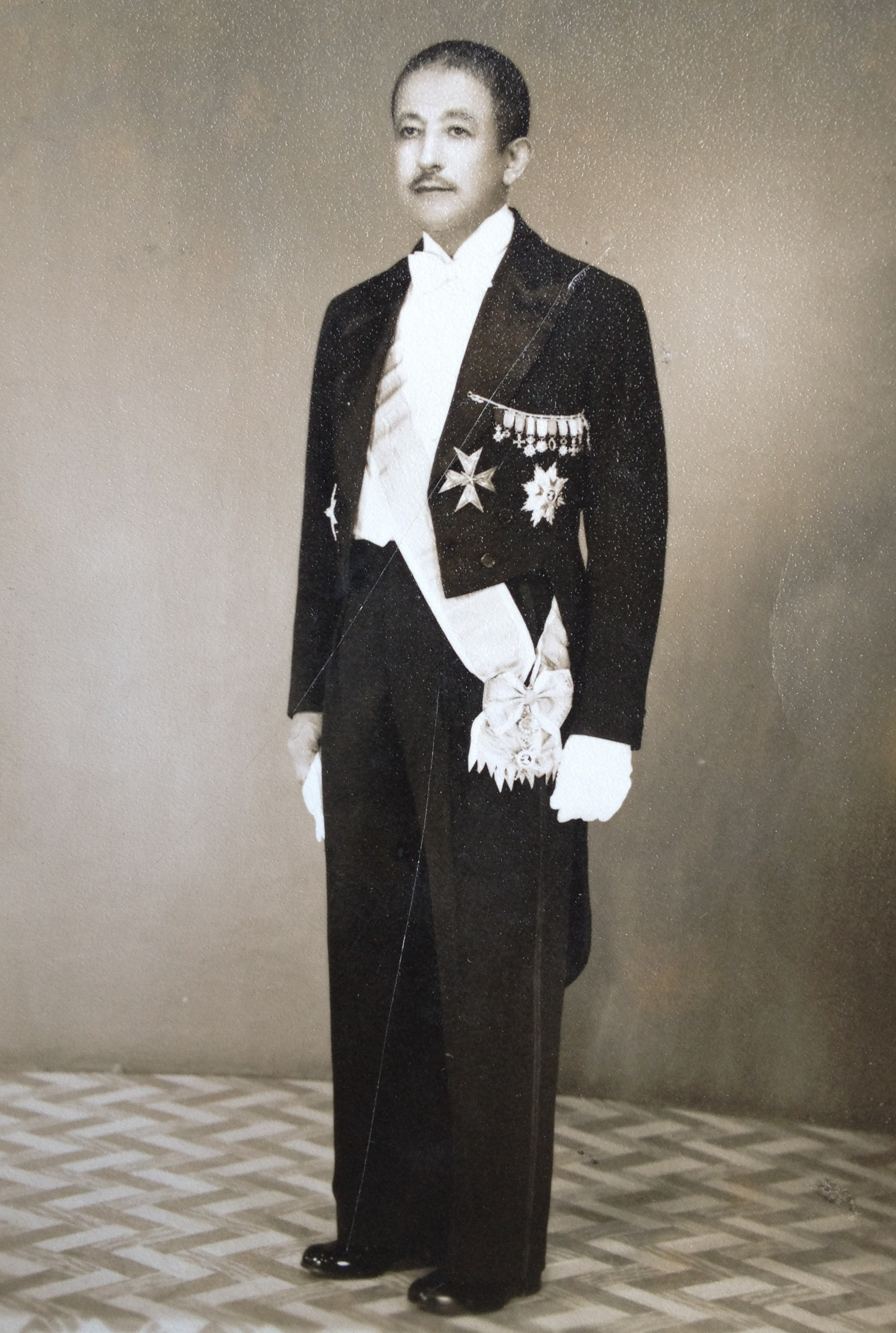
Kebede Michael (1916–1998)

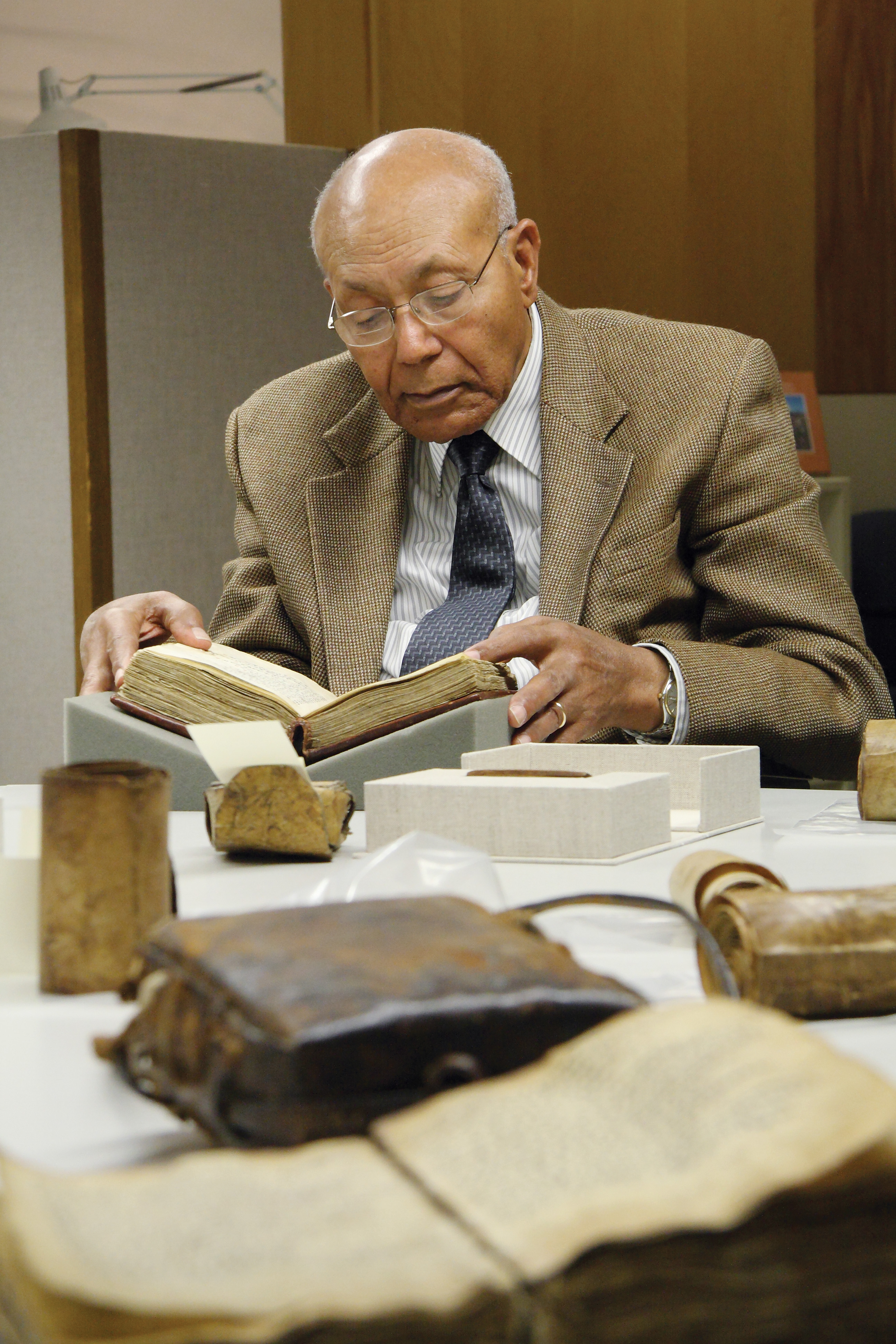
Getatchew Haile (1931–2021)

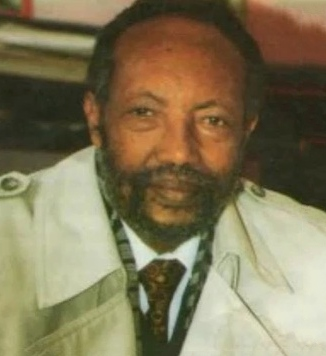
Tsegaye Gabre-Medhin (1936–2006)

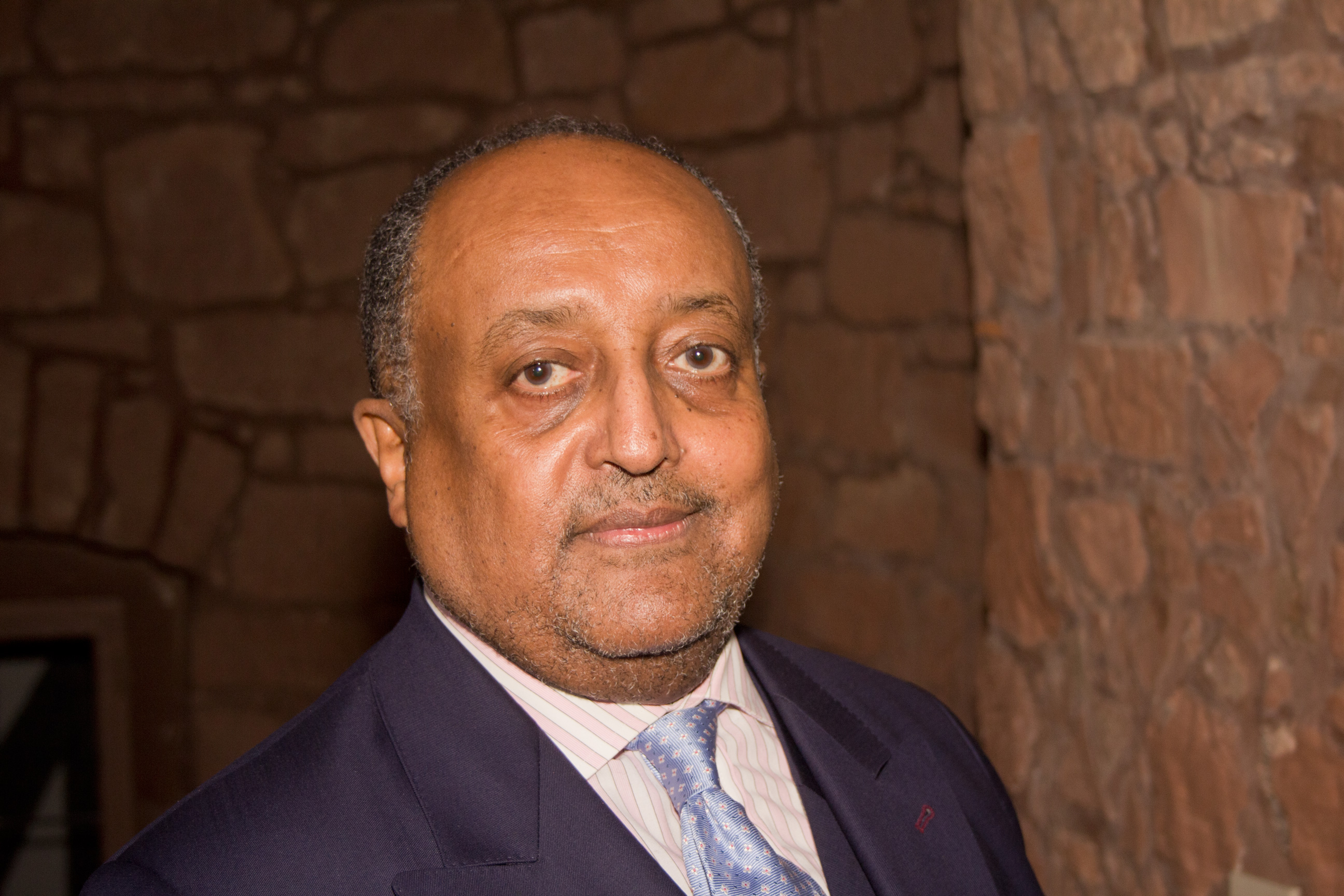
Asfa-Wossen Asserate (1948–present)

=== Music ===
Up until the mid 20th century, Amharic music consisted mainly of religious and secular folk songs and dances. Qañat Amhara secular folk music developed in the countryside through the use of traditionel instruments such as the masenqo, a one-string bowed lute; the krar, a six-string lyre; and the washint flute played by the local village musicians called the Azmaris, and the peasantry dancing the Eskista; the most well known Amharan folk dance. The begena, a large ten-string lyre; is an important instrument solely devoted to the spiritual part of Amhara music. Other instruments includes the Meleket wind instrument, and the Kebero and Negarit drums.

From the 1950s onward foreign influence i.e. foreign educated Ethiopians and the availability of larger quantities of new instruments led to new genre's of Amharic music and ushered in the 1960s and 1970s Golden Age of Ethiopian music. The popular Ethio-Jazz genre pioneered by Mulatu Astatke was created from the Tizita qañat of the Amhara combined with the use of Western instruments. Saxophone legend Getatchew Mekurya instrumentalized the Amhara war cry Shellela into a genre in the 1950s before joining the Ethio-Jazz scene later in his career. Other Amharic artists from the Golden age such as Asnaketch Worku, Bahru Kegne, Kassa Tessema and Mary Armede were renowned for their mastery of traditionel instruments.

The political turmoil during the Derg regime (1974–1991) led to censorship of music; night life came to a standstill through government imposed curfews and the curbing of musical performances. Notable Ethiopian musicians were jailed including those of Amhara descent such as Ayalew Mesfin and Telela Kebede. A revival of Qene; Amharic poetic songs which uses double entendre known as sam-enna warq (wax and gold) was used for subversive dialogue and resistance to state censorship. Thousands of Ethiopians including musicians migrated during this period to form communities in different countries.

Amharic songs of resistance against the autocratic EPRDF regime led by the TPLF (1991–2018) continued; with prevailing themes being rampant corruption, economic favoritism, excessive emphasis on ethnic identity and its ability to undermine national unity. Amharic musicians; such as Getish Mamo, Nhatty Man, Teddy Afro and others turned to the old tradition of sam-enna warq and used layered expression to evade skirt stringent censorship and oppressive laws (such as the anti-terror law) while reminding the people of their similarities and the importance of maintaining solidarity.

In June 2022 Teddy Afro bashed Abiy Ahmed and his regime in a critical new song (Na'et), following the Gimbi massacre. In his song he tries to vent the suppressed public anger and indignation, the swelling public resentment to the chaos in the country.

=== Clothing ===
Amhara women traditionally wear the Habesha kemis, a long, white, handwoven cotton dress often decorated with colorful tibeb embroidery along the borders, neckline, and sleeves. The kemis is usually made of shemma, a handwoven cotton fabric. The Habesha kemis is the primary attire of Amhara women and is closely associated with cultural identity. Habesha kemis (Amharic: ቀሚስ, meaning "Dress" in Amharic) is an Amharic term used by Amharas to refer to their traditional women's attire. The Habesha kemis embroidery patterns vary by region such as Shewa, Gojjam, Gondar, and Wollo.

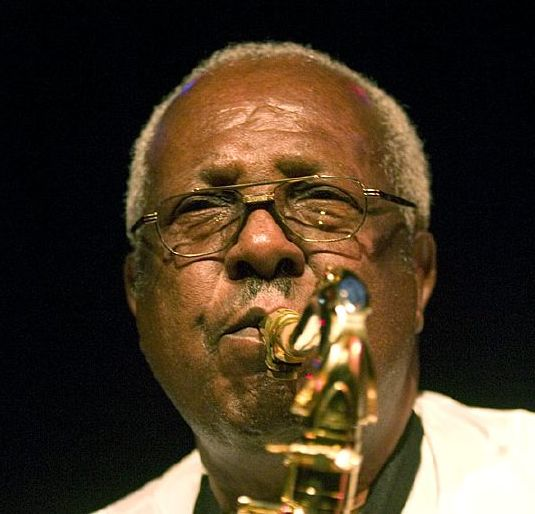
Getatchew Mekurya(1935–2016)

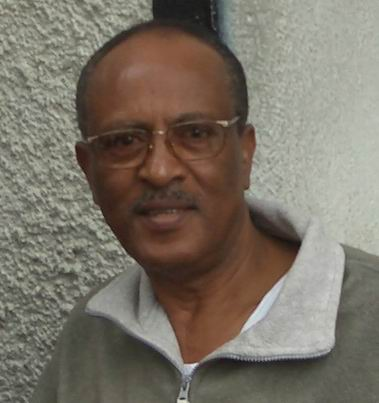
Tilahun Gessesse(1940–2009)

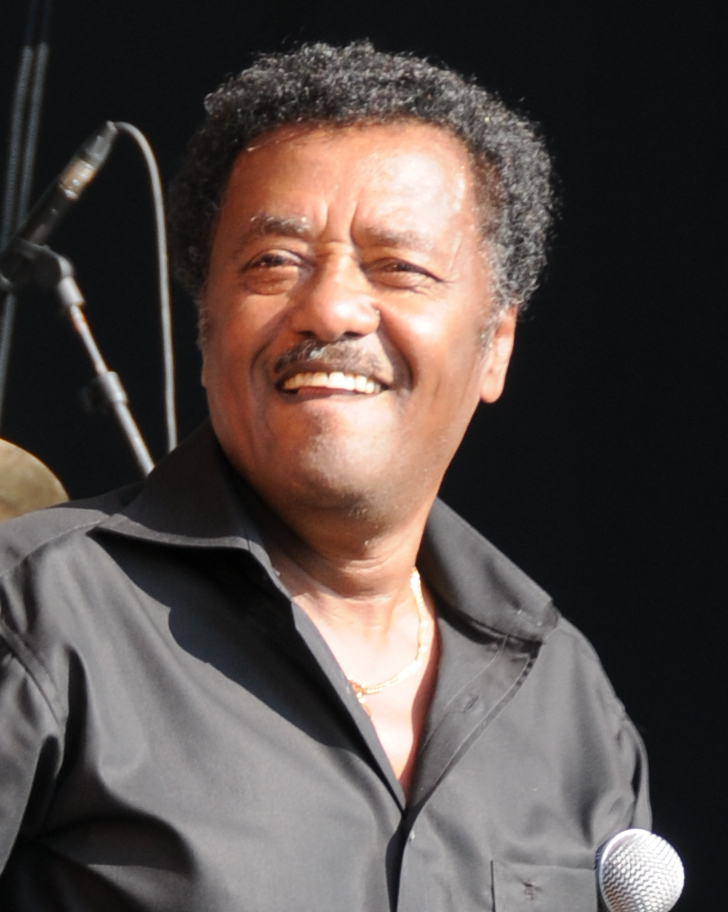
Alemayehu Eshete(1941–2021)

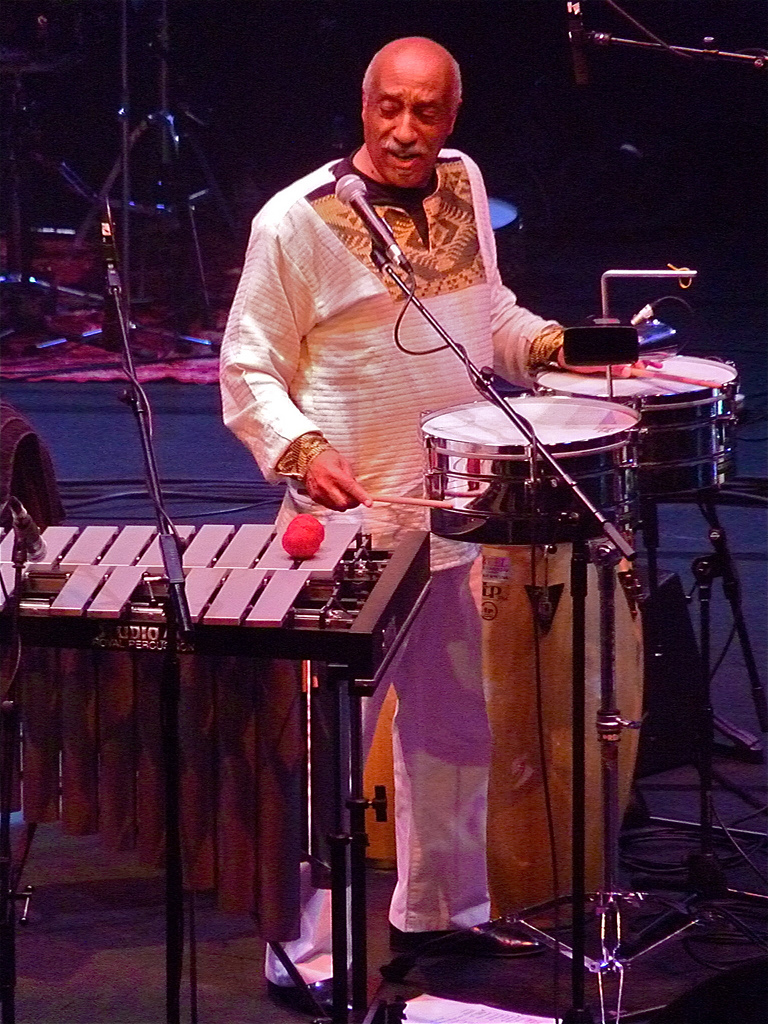
Mulatu Astatke
(1943–present)

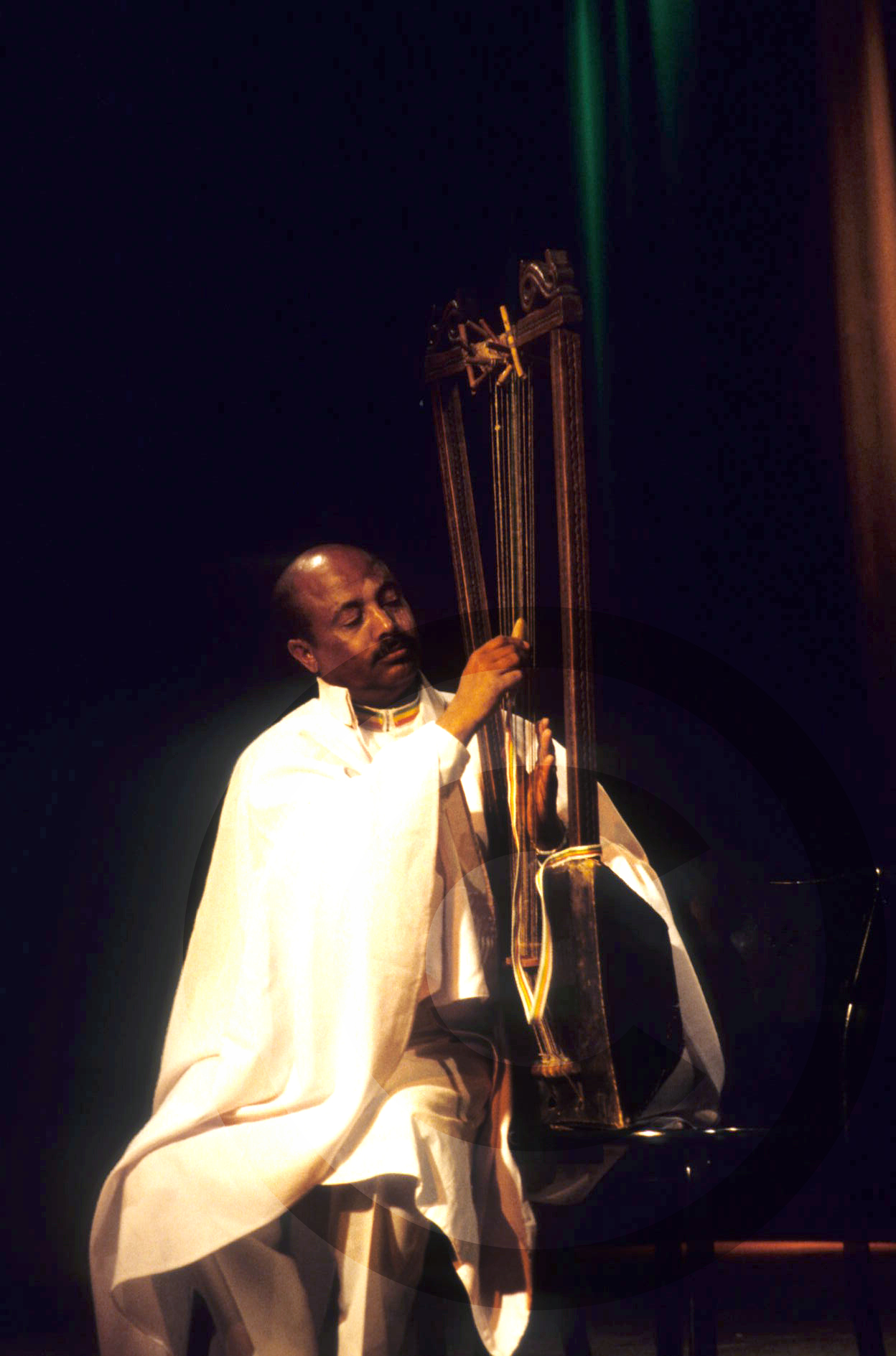
Alemu Aga
(1950–present)

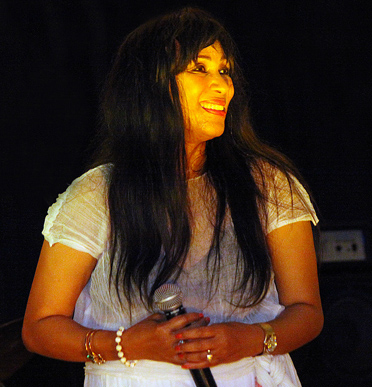
Aster Aweke
(1959–present)

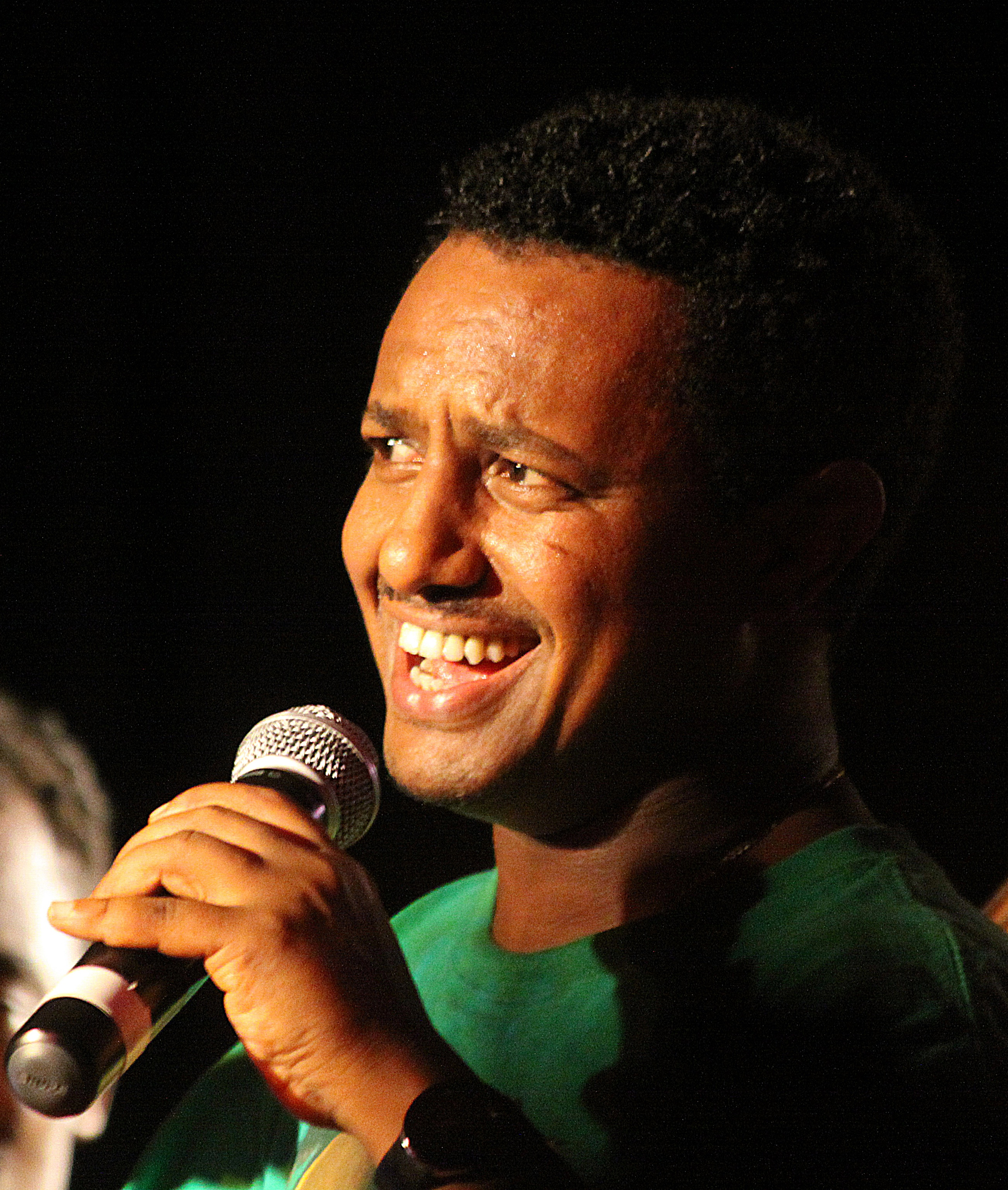
Teddy Afro
(1976–present)

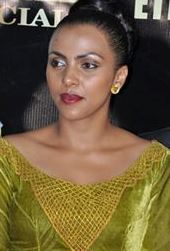
Zeritu Kebede
(1984–present)

=== Art ===
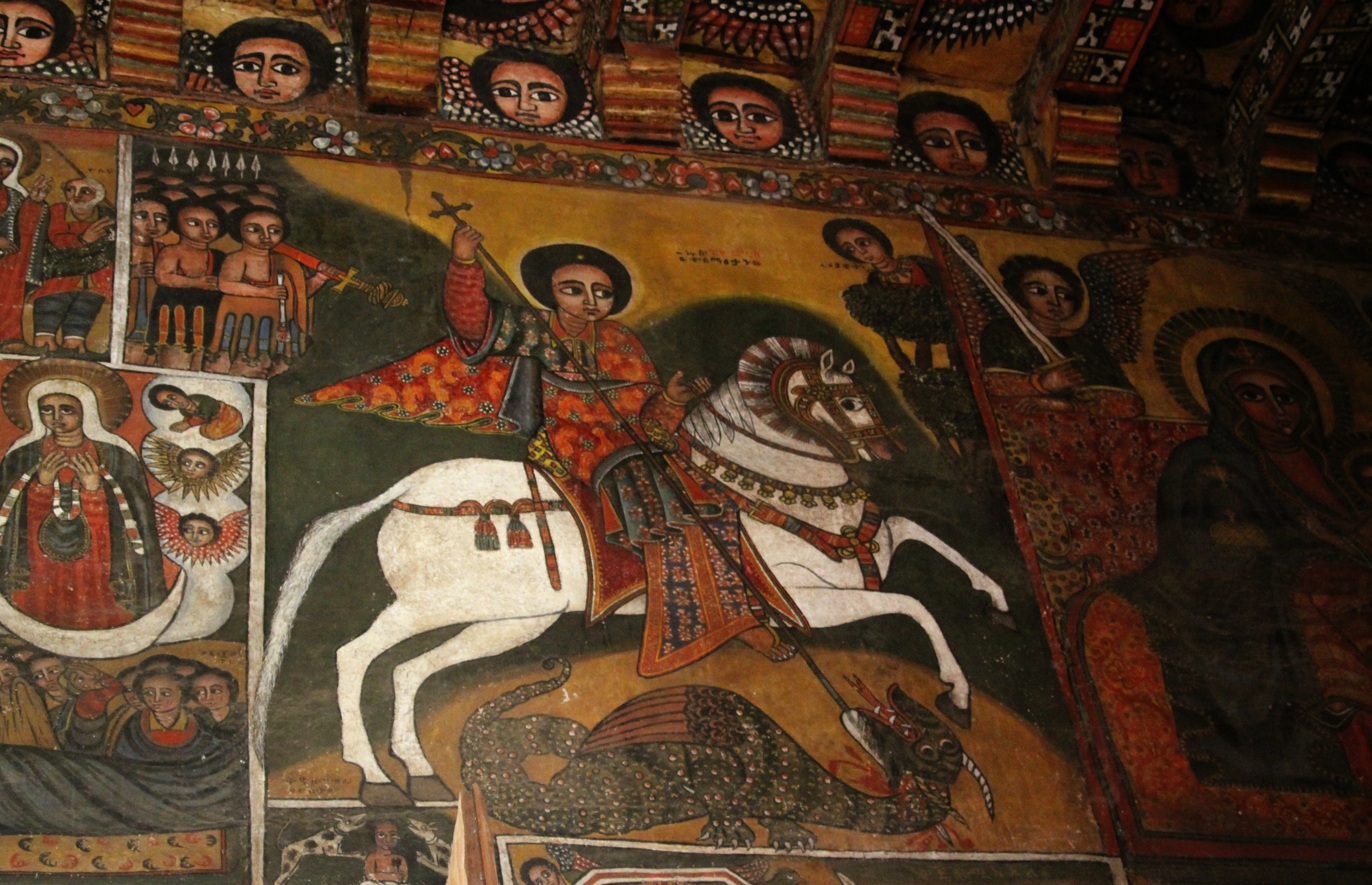
A mural depicting Saint George in the church of Debre Berhan Selassie in Gondar.

Amhara art is typified by religious paintings. One of the notable features of these is the large eyes of the subjects, who are usually biblical figures. It is usually oil on canvas or hide, some surviving from the Middle Ages. The Amhara art includes weaved products embellished with embroidery. Works in gold and silver exist in the form of filigree jewelry and religious emblems. The Amhara ethnic group was the most influential in the development of traditional Ethiopian Orthodox iconography from the 13th century on. Ethiopian Orthodox iconography can be categorized into multiple historical periods such as Medieval, "Low", and "High Gondarine," with the oldest datable church frescos being found in Lasta of the northeastern Amhara region and Gondar serving as the center of painting for the Ethiopian and Eritrean highlands. Indeed, there is an influx of Ethiopian Orthodox art dating to the early Solomonic period and first couple centuries following the founding of the Ethiopian Empire. With continuing to develop during the Gondarian period of the 17th and 18th centuries came a popular Amharic saying, "those who want to draw, go to Gondar.

=== Kinship and marriage ===
The Amhara culture recognizes kinship, but unlike other ethnic groups in the Horn of Africa region, it has a lesser role. Household relationships are primary, and the major economic, political and cultural functions are not based on kin relationships among the Amharas. Rather abilities of the individual matter. For example, states Donald Levine, the influence of clergy among the Amhara has been based on "ritual purity, doctrinal knowledge, ability to perform miracles and capacity to provide moral guidance". The social relationships in the Amhara culture are predominantly based on hierarchical patterns and individualistic associations.

Family and kin relatives are often involved in arranging semanya (eighty bond marriage, also called kal kidan), which has been most common and allows divorce. Other forms of marriage include qurban, which is solemnized in church, where divorce is forbidden, and usually observed among the orthodox priests. Patrilineal descent is the norm. While the wife had no inheritance rights, in case a child was conceived during the temporary damoz marriage, the child could make a claim a part of the father's property.

=== Cuisine ===
Amhara cuisine consists of various vegetable or spicy meat side dishes and entrées, usually a wat, or thick stew, served atop injera, a large sourdough flatbread made of teff flour in the shape of pancakes usually of about 30 to 45 cm in diameter. When eating traditional injera dishes in groups, it is normally eaten from a mesob (shared food basket), with each person breaking off pieces of injera flatbread using only the right hand, from the side nearest them and dipping it into stew in the center of the basket. There is also a great variety of vegetarian stews such as lentils, ground split peas, grains, accompanied by injera or bread.

Amharas adhering to any of the Abrahmic religions do not eat pork or shellfish of any kind for religious reasons. Amhara Orthodox Christians do not consume meat and dairy products (i.e. egg, butter, milk, and cheese) during specific fasting periods, and on every Wednesdays and Fridays except the 50 days between Easter and Pentecost. On all other days meat and dairy products are allowed. A variety of vegan dishes are consumed during fasting periods.

Ethiopia is a Buna (coffee) exporter, but also has a very large domestic consumer base. During social gatherings Amharas drink Buna in a unique and traditional way known as a coffee ceremony. First the coffee is roasted, then ground and placed in a Jebena (coffee pot) with boiling water. When ready it is then served to people in little cups, up to three times per ceremony.

The ceremony is typically performed by the woman of the household, or the female host and is considered an honor. Amhara women dress up for the occasion in a kemis, a traditional dress. Other locally produced beverages are tella (beer) and tej (honey wine), which are served and drunk on major religious festivals, Saints Days and weddings.

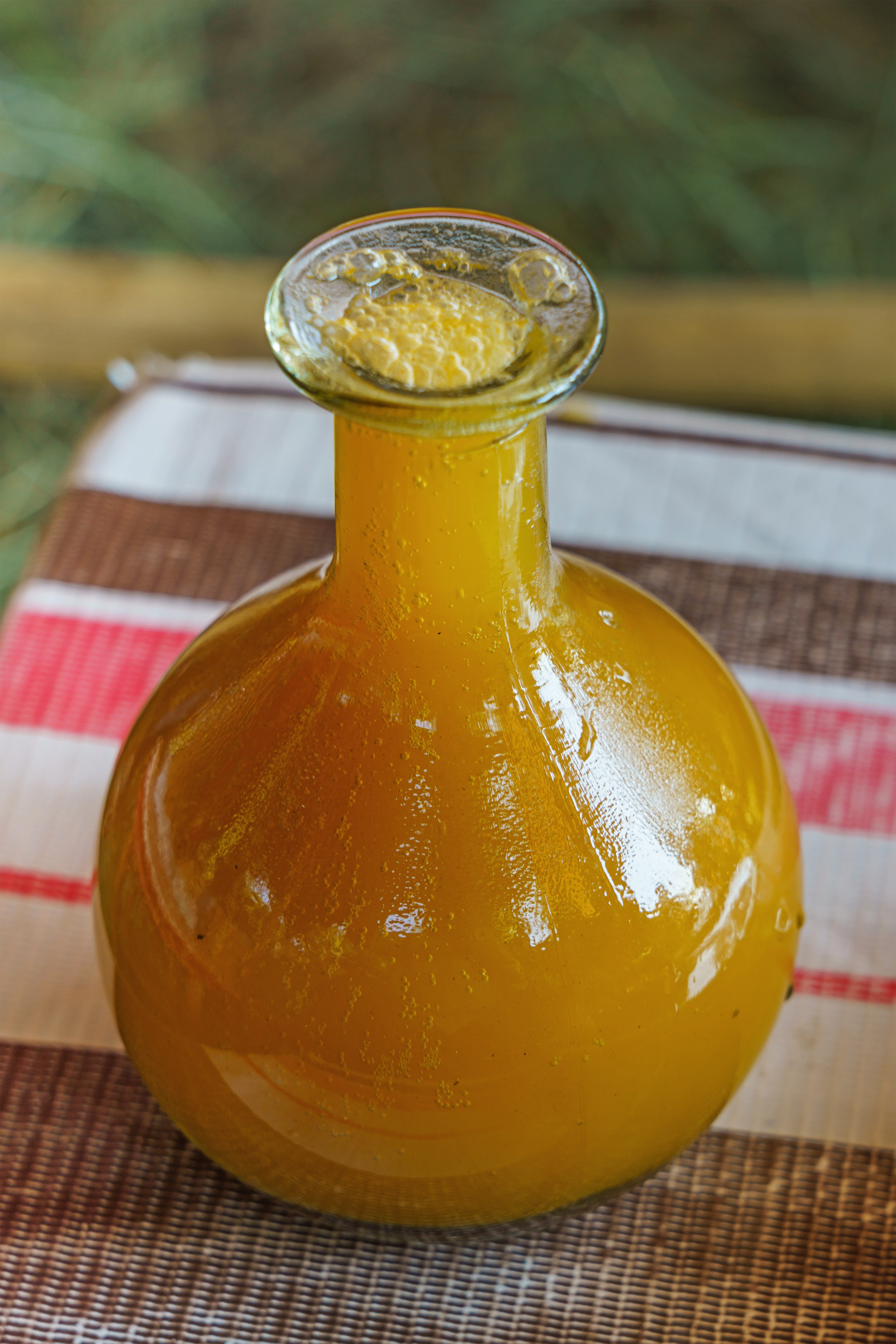
Tej
A honey wine, fermented with gesho leaves and twigs, often enjoyed during celebrations.

== Nature of Amhara ethnicity ==
Mackonen Michael (2008) noted that the Amhara identity is claimed to be composed of multiple ethnicities by some, whereas others "reject this concept and argue that Amhara exists as a distinctive ethnic group with a specific located boundary". He further noted that "although people from the Ethiopian highland areas think of themselves as Amharas, the Northern Shoans specifically call themselves Amhara. That is why the Oromo and Tigrian discourse associate the Northern Shoans as oppressive-Amharas."

According to Gideon P. E. Cohen, writing in 2000, there is some debate about "whether the Amhara can legitimately be regarded as an ethnic group, [...] given their distribution throughout Ethiopia, and the incorporative capacity of the group that has led to the inclusion of individuals from a wide range of ethnic or linguistic backgrounds". Similarly, Tezera Tazebew notes that "the early 1990s was marked by debates, both popular and scholarly, on the (non-)existence of Amhara as a distinct ethnic group", giving the debate between the academic Mesfin Woldemariam and president of the Transitional Government of Ethiopia Meles Zenawi in July 1991 as an example.

Due to large amounts of assimilation into the northern Amhara culture after Ethiopian imperial expansion, Siegfried Pausewang concluded in 2005 that "the term Amhara relates in contemporary Ethiopia to two different and distinct social groups. The ethnic group of the Amhara, mostly a peasant population, is different from a mixed group of urban people coming from different ethnic background, who have adopted Amharic as a common language and identify themselves as Ethiopians".

In a 2017 article, historian Brian J. Yates notes that some "scholars and politicians have attempted to sketch out what an Amhara is, but there are considerable divergences on the nature of this identity. Some argue that it is a cultural identity; however, much of the scholarship indicates that it is solely a class-based identity, devoid of ethnicity".

Solomon Gashaw asserts that "there is no intra-Amhara ethnic consciousness, except among northern settlers in southern Ethiopia". He notes that most Amharic-speaking people identify by their place of birth. He asks, "what is Amhara domination?", answering: "It is a linguistic and cultural domination by a multi-ethnic group who speak Amharic".

Writing in 1998, Tegegne Teka wrote that "the Amhara do not possess what people usually refer to as objective ethnic markers: common ancestry, territory, religion and shared experience except the language. The Amhara have no claims to a common ancestry. They do not share the same sentiments and they have no mutual interests based on shared understandings. It is, therefore, difficult to conclude that the Amhara belong to an ethnic group. But this does not mean that there is no Amhara identity".

According to ethnographer Donald Levine, writing in 2003 and citing Christopher Clapham, "Only in the last quarter of the 20th cent. has the term [Amhara] come to be a common ethnic appellation, comparable to the way in which Oromo has become generalized to cover peoples who long knew themselves primarily as Boorana (Boräna), Guğği, Mäč̣č̣a and the like. Even so, Amharic-speaking Šäwans still feel themselves closer to non-Amharic-speaking Šäwans than to Amharic-speakers from distant regions like Gondär and there are few members of the Šäwan nobility who do not have Oromo genealogical links". According to Takkele Taddese, Amharic-speakers tend to be a "supra-ethnic group" composed of "fused stock". Taddese describes the Amhara as follows:

The Amhara can thus be said to exist in the sense of being a fused stock, a supra-ethnically conscious ethnic Ethiopian serving as the pot in which all the other ethnic groups are supposed to melt. The language, Amharic, serves as the center of this melting process although it is difficult to conceive of a language without the existence of a corresponding distinct ethnic group speaking it as a mother tongue. The Amhara does not exist, however, in the sense of being a distinct ethnic group promoting its own interests and advancing the Herrenvolk philosophy and ideology as has been presented by the elite politicians. The basic principle of those who affirm the existence of the Amhara as a distinct ethnic group, therefore, is that the Amhara should be dislodged from the position of supremacy and each ethnic group should be freed from Amhara domination to have equal status with everybody else. This sense of Amhara existence can be viewed as a myth.

=== Ethnic consciousness in the past ===
In the 17th century, Abyssinian traveler Abba Gorgoryos states the following in a letter to his German friend Hiob Ludolf:

As to my origins, do not imagine, my friend, that they are humble, for I am of the House of Amhara which is a respected tribe; from it come the heads of the Ethiopian people, the governors, the military commanders, the judges and the advisers of the King of Ethiopia who appoint and dismiss, command and rule in the name of the King, his governors, and grandees. "

On 28 March 1898, near Lake Rudolf, a first-hand account of Russian officer, Alexander Bulatovich, detailing hostile exchange of words between the Turkana people and Welde Giyorgis Aboye's forces, where Bulatovich was attached to as an advisor to the Ras.

*Amhara forces: "We are from the sovereign of the Amhara Menelik."
Turkana tribe: "We do not know Amhara-Menelik. Go away! Go away!"

- Turkana tribe: "Who is this Amhara-Menelik to whom we are supposed to submit?"
  Amhara forces: "We are Amhara, and Menelik is our great king."

=== The rise of ethnic consciousness and nationalism ===
Zola Moges notes the emergence of Amhara nationalism and ethnic consciousness with origins in the early 1990s but taking clearer shape with the establishment of the National Movement of Amhara in 2018 along with the rise of Fano ethnic militias in the 2010s. Moges writes that a "younger generation has adopted its 'Amharaness'; but most ordinary people are yet to fully embrace it, not least because of the lack of any effectively articulated ideological foundation or priorities and the absence of any 'tailor-made' solutions to the challenges facing them".

Amanuel Tesfaye writes that: "While the older Amhara population still detest ethnic identification and ethnic forms of political organization, preferring pan-Ethiopian nationalism, the young have no problem pronouncing their Amhara identity, advocating for the protection and advancement of the rights and interests of their ethnic kin within the framework of the multi-nation state, and organizing politically along that particular ethnic identity".

== Genetics ==
=== Autosomal ancestry ===
Research shows that Amharas have a mixture of a type of native African ancestry unique and autochthonous to the Horn of Africa, as well as ancestry originating from a non-African back-migration.

Studies comparing blood oxygenation in Amharas to nearby lowlands populations, and to the Andeans and Tibetans showed unique adaptations to living in a high altitude environment.

=== Uniparental lineages ===
Haplogroup E1b1b was found at 35.4% among the 48 sampled Amhara in a study. However, other studies have found an almost equal representation of E1b1b at approximately 57% in both the 25 Oromo and the 34 Amhara individuals. The second most prevalent lineage Haplogroup J, has been found to exist at levels as high as 35.4% in the Amhara, of which 33.3% is of the type J1, while 2.1% is of J2 type.

Besides being the most prevalent Y-chromosome in Amharas, E1b1b (formerly E3b) also makes up a significant portion of the paternal ancestry among Sudanese, Egyptians, Berbers, Maghrebi Arabs, as well as many Middle Eastern and Mediterranean populations. According to Cruciani et al. (2007), the presence of this subhaplogroup in the Horn region may represent the traces of an ancient migration from Egypt/Libya. (Note: Cruciani et al. 2007 use the term Northeastern Africa to refer to Egypt and Libya, as shown in Table 1 of the study. Prior to Cruciani et al. 2007, Semino et al. 2004 East Africa as a possible place of origin of E-M78, based upon Ethiopian testing. This was because of the high frequency and diversity of E-M78 lineages in the region of Ethiopia. However, Cruciani et al. 2007 were able to study more data, including populations from North Africa who were not represented in the Semino et al. 2004 study, and found evidence that the E-M78 lineages which make up a significant proportion of some populations in that region, were relatively young branches (see E-V32 below). They therefore concluded that "Northeast Africa" was the likely place of origin of E-M78 based on "the peripheral geographic distribution of the most derived subhaplogroups with respect to northeastern Africa, as well as the results of quantitative analysis of UEP and microsatellite diversity". So according to Cruciani et al. 2007 E-M35, the parent clade of E-M78, originated in East Africa, subsequently spread to Northeast Africa, and then there was a "back migration" of E-M215 chromosomes that had acquired the E-M78 mutation. Cruciani et al. 2007 therefore note this as evidence for "a corridor for bidirectional migrations" between Northeast Africa (Egypt and Libya in their data) on the one hand and East Africa on the other. The authors believe there were "at least 2 episodes between 23.9–17.3 ky and 18.0–5.9 ky ago".)

In the region, mitochondrial lines descended from the Eurasian haplogroup N peak in northern Ethiopia. According to multiple mtDNA studies The matrilineal lineage M1 is common among Ethiopians and North Africans, particularly Egyptians and Algerians. M1 is believed to have originated in Asia, where its parent M clade represents the majority of mtDNA lineages. This haplogroup is also thought to possibly correlate with the Afro-Asiatic language family: In addition, Horn African populations also carry a significant rate of maternal L lineages associated with sub-Saharan Africa.

"We analysed mtDNA variation in ~250 persons from Libya, Somalia, and Congo/Zambia, as representatives of the three regions of interest. Our initial results indicate a sharp cline in M1 frequencies that generally does not extend into sub-Saharan Africa. While our North and especially East African samples contained frequencies of M1 over 20%, our sub-Saharan samples consisted almost entirely of the L1 or L2 haplogroups only. In addition, there existed a significant amount of homogeneity within the M1 haplogroup. This sharp cline indicates a history of little admixture between these regions. This could imply a more recent ancestry for M1 in Africa, as older lineages are more diverse and widespread by nature, and may be an indication of a back-migration into Africa from the Middle East."

=== Adaptation to high-altitude environments ===
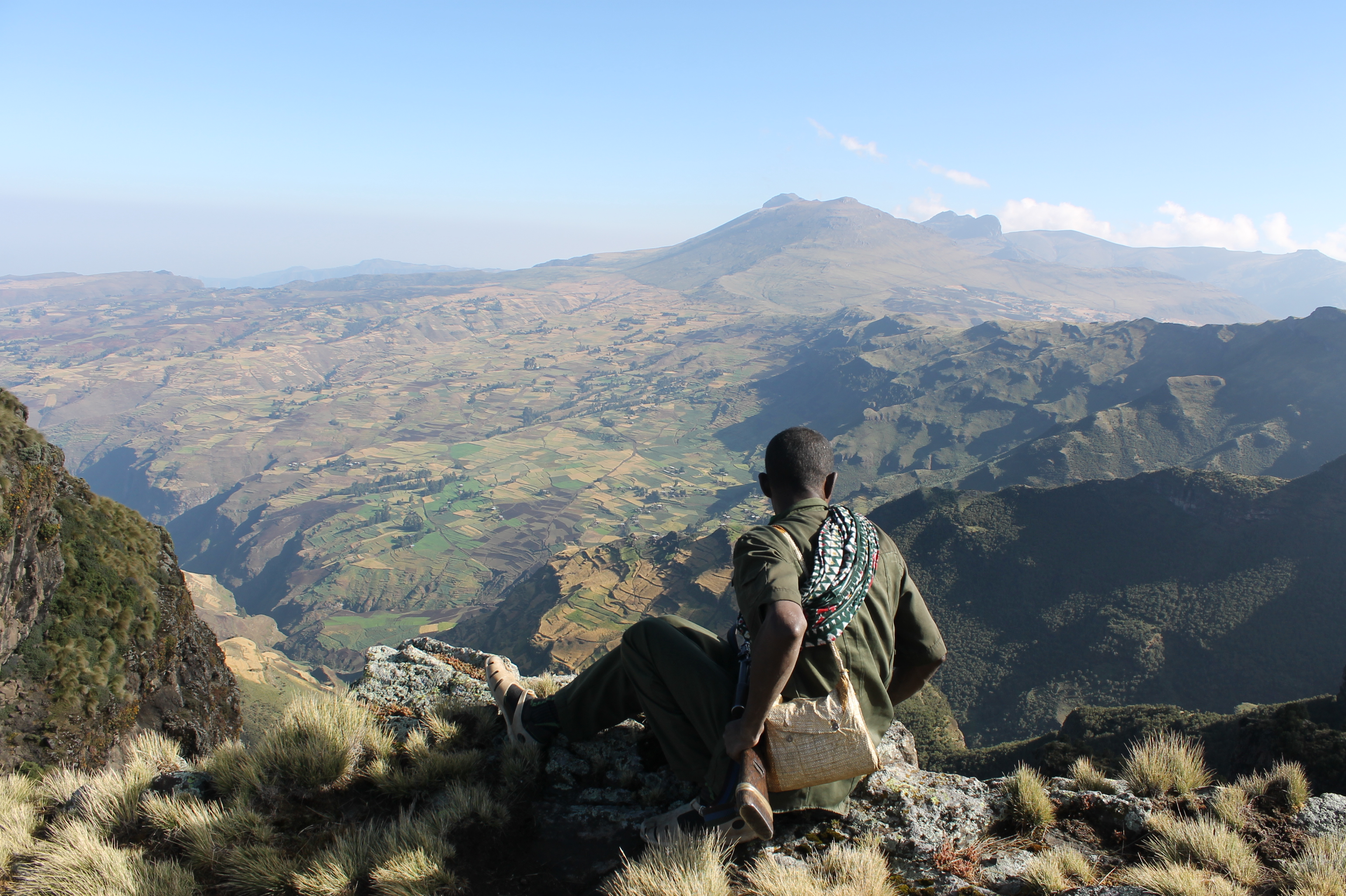
Scout resting at the Ras Bwahit ascension, Simien Mountains

Studies comparing blood oxygenation in Amharas to neighboring populations and to the Andeans and Tibetans showed adaptations for high-altitude, low-oxygen (hypoxic) environments unique to them. What truly sets the Amhara apart from other high elevation populations globally is the ability to withstand a state of low blood oxygen content without suffering from blood thickening (Hyperviscosity syndrome) and its downstream effects. "Amhara highlanders, but not Oromo, had higher NO3- and cGMP compared with their lowland counterparts. NO3- directly correlated with cGMP." There are four major world regions where ~140 million persons reside at high altitude, one of which is the Amhara homeland. In the area, genetic adaptations (e.g., rs10803083, an SNP associated with the rate and function of hemoglobin; BHLHE41, a gene associated with circadian rhythm and hypoxia response; EGLN1, a gene strongly associated with oxygen homeostasis in mammals) to hypoxia and low atmospheric pressure have been found among the people, which may have developed within the past 5000 years. "In the Amhara, SNP rs10803083 is associated with hemoglobin levels at genome-wide levels of significance." However, a Chinese study states:

"The Amhara, an Ethiopian ethnic group, and Tibetan highlanders have adapted to high-altitude, low-oxygen environments using similar physiological mechanisms; however, they are influenced by different genes. Both groups have adapted to use oxygen more efficiently via lowered hemoglobin levels. This also reduces their risk of adverse hypoxia-related effects such as thickened blood, which increase risk of stroke and heart attack. However, genetic variations that contribute to lowered hemoglobin levels in Tibetan highlanders, such as EPAS1 and EGLN1, were found to be largely absent in the Amharan genome. Instead, Amharan hemoglobin levels are controlled by a genetic variation known as rs10803083. In both groups, however, the effects are pronounced. The Amhara produce 10% less hemoglobin than their counterparts, the Omoro lowlanders. When Omoro reach high altitudes, their blood hemoglobin levels increase in the same manner reported in lowlander Tibetans attempting to climb the Himalayas."

"Tibetan and Amhara highlanders evolved a dampened acclimation response in haemoglobin levels." state Di Rienzo ET Al. "Research by Beall and colleagues in the early 2000s revealed that Oromo cope with thin air in much the same way that lowlanders visiting high altitude do – i.e., by making more hemoglobin. In contrast, Amhara highlanders – whose ancestors have inhabited mountainous regions for thousands of years longer than the Omoro – are able to maintain blood hemoglobin levels that are roughly 10% lower than Omoro living at the same altitude; When they scanned the villagers' DNA, the researchers found a genetic variant associated with low hemoglobin levels in the Amhara." They continue: "This variant was located in a different region of the genome than those previously found to be associated with low hemoglobin in Tibetans. In other words, the physiological coping mechanisms shared by Amhara and Tibetans in response to life at high altitude – i.e. dampened hemoglobin levels – are due to different underlying genes."

"HA human populations across the world allow studying independent realizations of the adaptive process in response to the same selective pressure, i.e. hypoxia, thus providing an excellent opportunity to investigate how natural selection shapes the genetic architecture of adaptive traits. To make progress on these enduring questions, we have sampled two closely related ethnic groups in the Ethiopian highlands that include both HA and LA residents, thus allowing comparisons across altitudes within and between ethnic groups. Of these two groups, the Oromo have moved to HA only 500 years ago, thus making it unlikely that genetic adaptations evolved in this group. In contrast, the Amhara have a history of HA residence of at least 5 ky and possibly as far as 70 ky. Because previously identified selection signals occurred within a similar period of time, including HA adaptations, we conclude that enough time has elapsed since the Amhara moved to HA for genetic adaptations to have taken place. Consistent with this idea, we observe significant phenotypic differences between Amhara highlanders and the more recent HA residents, i.e. the Oromo. While HA Amhara are characterized by mildly elevated Hb levels (similar to Tibetans) and no or mildly reduced O2 sat, the HA Oromo sample resembles acclimatized lowlanders."

Researchers identified multiple SNPs with allele frequencies that are unusual in the Amhara relative to both the Omotic and Yoruba population samples. "This pattern of haplotype variation is consistent with positive selection on an Amhara-specific variant that is being tagged by the high frequency haplotype."

"We highlight several candidate genes for involvement in high-altitude adaptation in Ethiopia, including MICU1, VAV3, ARNT2 and THRB. Although most of these genes have not been identified in previous studies of high-altitude Tibetan or Andean population samples, two of these genes (THRB and ARNT2) play a role in the HIF-1 pathway, a pathway implicated in previous work reported in Tibetan and Andean studies. These combined results suggest that adaptation to high altitude arose independently due to convergent evolution in high-altitude Amhara populations in Ethiopia. Tibetans present markedly low O2 sat, but relatively little increase in Hb levels, and Amhara in Ethiopia present little reduction in O2 sat or increase in Hb levels. Whether these phenotypic contrasts reflect different genetic adaptations across populations remains an open question."

Higher urinary nitrate, and lower cGMP and diastolic blood pressure levels in the longer-resident Amhara than the shorter-resident Oromo groups such as those of Bale were interpreted as indicating greater peripheral vasodilation (widening of blood vessels). Nitric oxide causes dilation of blood vessels, allowing blood to flow more freely to the extremities and aids the release of oxygen to tissues.

Various papers failed to answer whether these were very ancient adaptations or new ones. Hominins have been resident in Ethiopia for millions of years, meaning adaptations to higher elevations have presumably existed just as long. Amhara occupy an intermediate position between African and non-African populations so an ancestral population fixed for ancestral alleles at all SNPs was used but this did not answer whether the adaptations are new. "More pointedly the Ethiopians can be modeled as a compound of an Arabian population with an indigenous East African one." states Razib Khan "If this is a genuine recent admixture event, then one might be able to ascertain via haplotype structure whether the adaptive variants derive from ancient African genetic variation, or whether they're novel mutations." Ancestors of the Amhara have inhabited altitudes above 2500 meters since the Bronze Age and altitudes around 2300–2400 meters as far back as the Middle Paleolithic meaning sufficient time has elapsed since the Amhara moved to high altitudes for genetic adaptations to have taken place.

== Demographics ==
According to the 2007 national census, Amharas numbered 19,867,817 individuals, comprising 26.9% of Ethiopia's population, and they are mostly Oriental Orthodox Christian (members of the Ethiopian Orthodox Tewahedo Church).

They are also found within the Ethiopian expatriate community, particularly in North America. They speak Amharic, an Afroasiatic language of the Semitic branch which serves as the main and one of the five official languages of Ethiopia. As of 2018, Amharic has over 32 million native speakers and 25 million second language speakers.

== Notable Amharas ==
=== A ===
- Aba Gorgorios, Catholic priest
- Abebe Aregai, Prime Minister
- Abebe Aleme Bikila, Olympic athlete, gold medalist
- Abel Tesfaye (The Weeknd), Grammy-winning artist, singer, and global pop star
- Abuna Basilios, First Patriarch of the Ethiopian Orthodox Tewahido Church
- Abune Merkorios
- Abune Petros
- Abuna Takla Haymanot
- Abuna Theophilos, Second Patriarch of the Ethiopian Orthodox Tewahido Church
- Afevork Ghevre Jesus, Ethiopian writer
- Afewerk Tekle, Honorable Laureate Maitre Artiste
- Aklilu Habte-Wold, Former foreign minister and Prime Minister
- Ale Felege Selam, painter
- Alemayehu Eshete, Ethiopian singer
- Alemu Aga, musician, singer, and master of the Begena
- Amanuel Gebremichael
- Amda Seyon I, Emperor of the Ethiopian Empire
- Amha Iyasus, ruler of Shewa
- Andualem Aragie, Vice President and Press Secretary for the Ethiopian-based Unity for Democracy and Justice
- Anestasyos, ruler of Bete Amhara, Damot & Shewa
- Asfaw Wossen, ruler of Shewa
- Ashenafi Kebede
- Asnaketch Worku, Ethiopia's first professional theatre actress and legendary musician, known as the "Queen of Kirar"
- Asrat Woldeyes, Ethiopia's first Western-trained surgeon and the leading pioneer of Amhara Nationalism
- Aster Aweke, Ethiopian singer

=== B ===
- Baeda Maryam I, Emperor of the Ethiopian Empire
- Bafena
- Bakaffa, Emperor of the Ethiopian Empire
- Bashah Aboye, military commander
- Belay Zeleke, patriot
- Berhaneyesus Demerew Souraphiel, Ethiopian Catholic cardinal, Head of the Ethiopian Catholic Church.

=== D ===
- Dawit I, Emperor of the Ethiopian Empire
- Dawit II, Emperor of the Ethiopian Empire
- Dawit III, Emperor of the Ethiopian Empire
- Demetros of Amhara, ruler of Shewa

=== E ===
- Eden Alene, Ethiopian-Israeli singer, competed at the Eurovision Song Contest
- Ejigayehu Shibabaw, better known as Gigi, Ethiopian singer
- Emahoy Tsegué-Maryam Guèbrou, Ethiopian nun known for her piano playing and compositions
- Eskender, Emperor of the Ethiopian Empire

=== F ===
- Fasilides, Emperor of the Ethiopian Empire

=== G ===
- Gebre Hanna, dabtara renowned in Amharic oral tradition
- Gebre Tasfa, 18th-19th century lord of Semien
- Gedion Zelalem
- Gelawdewos, Emperor of the Ethiopian Empire
- Gelila Bekele, International model
- Getatchew Haile, philologist
- Getatchew Mekurya, Legendary Ethiopian Jazz Saxophonist

=== H ===
- Haddis Alemayehu, Foreign Minister and Novelist
- Haile Gebrselassie, renowned world Athlete
- Haile Gerima, Award-winning writer, producer & director.
- Haile Maryam Gebre, lord of Semien and Welkait
- Haile Selassie, Emperor of the Ethiopian Empire
- Heruy Wolde Selassie, Foreign Minister

=== I ===
- Iyasu I, Emperor of the Ethiopian Empire
- Iyasu II, Emperor of the Ethiopian Empire

=== K ===
- Kaid Abu Muhammad Amhara Surur al-Fatiki, Ruler of Najahid dynasty
- Kebede Michael, Ethiopian writer
- Kidane Kale, Meridazmach of Shewa

=== L ===
- Leul Sagad, military commander & noblemen
- Liya Kebede, International supermodel

=== M ===
- Makonnen Wolde Mikael, Military officer, diplomat, court official
- Marcus Samuelsson, acclaimed chef and restaurateur
- Makonnen Endelkachew, Prime Minister
- Melaku Worede, agronomist and geneticist, Right Livelihood Award-winning scientist
- Menas of Ethiopia, Emperor of the Ethiopian Empire
- Menelik II, Emperor of the Ethiopian Empire
- Mesfin Woldemariam, author, Sakharov prize winning human rights activist and politician.
- Menen Asfaw, Empress of Ethiopia, reign between 2 November 1930 – 15 February 1962
- Mulatu Astatke, Musician and Father of Ethio-Jazz
- Muluken Melesse, Music Artist
  - Mohammed Hussein Al Amoudi- Entrepreneur

=== N ===
- Na'od, Emperor of the Ethiopian Empire
- Nagasi Krestos, ruler of Shewa
- Newaya Krestos, Emperor of the Ethiopian Empire
- Newaya Maryam, Emperor of the Ethiopian Empire

=== P ===
- Pnina Tamano-Shata, First Israeli Government Minister of Amahara descent

=== S ===
- Sahle Selassie, Negus of Shewa
- Sara Nuru, fashion model & entrepreneur
- Sarsa Dengel, Emperor of the Ethiopian Empire
- Sebestyanos, Meridazmach of Shewa
- Seifu Makonnen two-time olympic bokser
- Seifu Mikael, diplomat, governor
- Seleshi Bekele
- Simegnew Bekele, Chief Project Manager of the GERD
- Susenyos I, Emperor of the Ethiopian Empire

=== T ===
- Taytu Betul, Empress of Ethiopia from 1889 to 1913
- Teddy Afro, Ethiopian singer-songwriter
- Tekle Hawariat Tekle Mariyam, pioneer of Ethiopian and African theater, also military commander and politician.
- Tekle Haymanot
- Temesgen Tiruneh Director general of National Intelligence and Security Service
- Tessema Nadew, regent of Ethiopia
- Tewodros II, Emperor of the Ethiopian Empire

=== W ===
- Welde Giyorgis Aboye, Ethiopian general and noble
- Wolde Giorgis Wolde Yohannes, Minister of the pen
- Hakim Workneh Eshete, first Western-education doctor and diplomat
- Wossen Seged, ruler of Shewa
- Wube Haile Maryam, ruler of Semien & Tigray

=== Y ===
- Yaqob, Emperor of the Ethiopian Empire
- Yekuno Amlak, founder of the Solomonic Dynasty
- Yeshaq I, Emperor of the Ethiopian Empire
- Yetnebersh Nigussie, renowned lawyer and disability rights activist
- Yidnekatchew Tessema, 4th president of Confederation of African Football (CAF)

=== Z ===
- Zara Yaqob, Emperor of the Ethiopian Empire between 1434 - 1468
- Zewditu, Empress of Ethiopia between 1916 - 1930

== See also ==
- Amhara Region coup d'état attempt
- Ethiopians
- Habesha people
- History of Ethiopia
