= Afevork Ghevre Jesus =

Ethiopian writer (1868–1947)

Afäwarq Gäbrä Iyäsus
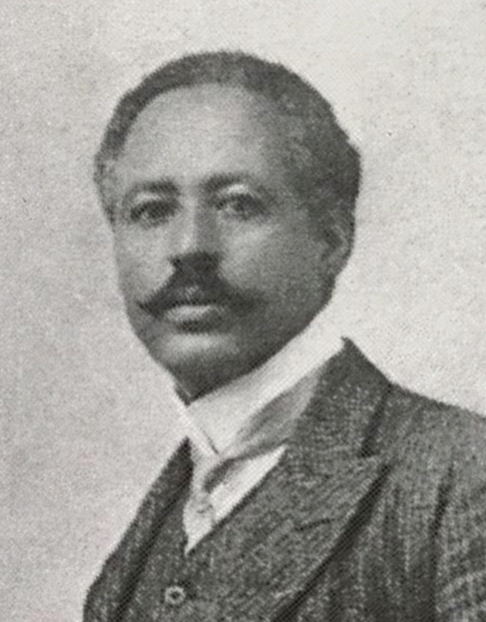
- Afäwarq in 1900
- Native name: አፈወርቅ ገብረ ኢየሱስ
- Born: 10 July 1868 Zege, Ethiopian Empire
- Died: 25 September 1947 Jimma, Ethiopian Empire
- Occupation: Novelist

Afäwarq Gäbrä Iyäsus (Amharic: አፈወርቅ ገብረ ኢየሱስ, romanized: āfewerik’i gebire īyesusi; spelled in Italian: Afevork Ghevre Jesus or Āfeworq Gebre Īyesūs; spelled in English Afewark Gebre Iyasus; 10 July 1868 – 25 September 1947) was an Ethiopian writer, who wrote the first novel in Amharic, Ləbb Wälläd Tarik (A Heart [better “Intellect”]-born Story), (Italian: Libb Wolled Tarik). Bahru Zewde writes, "Few people before or after him have demonstrated such superb mastery of the Amharic language. Few have ventured with such ingenuity into the hidden recesses of that language to come out with a wealth of vocabulary and idiom one scarcely thought the language possessed. Afäwarq is nonetheless a controversial figure for having supported the Italians during both the First and Second Italo-Ethiopian Wars.

== Biography ==
Of Amhara descent, Afäwarq was born in Zegé on the southern shore of Lake Tana. He received a traditional education from the church of Ura Kidana Mehrat under the direction of his grandfather Manher Denqe, whom Bahru Zewde describes as "a noted scholar." He also practiced painting in the traditional Ethiopian style.

Afäwarq was also related to the Empress Taytu Betul, and it apparently was through her that he was introduced to Emperor Menelik II's court sometime after 1880. It was there he came to the attention of the Italian diplomat Count Pietro Antonelli, who was impressed with his artistic abilities and enabled him to study in Italy. Afäwarq left for Italy in September 1887, and was admitted to the International Institute in Milan, where he attended classes in painting at the Albertina Academy of Fine Arts. During his studies in Milan, he was called to be the official interpreter for the Ethiopian delegation headed by then Dejazmach Makonnen Wolde Mikael. Afäwarq later claimed that it was he who pointed out the infamous discrepancy between the Amharic and Italian versions of article XVII of the Treaty of Wuchale.

He returned to Ethiopia, arriving in Addis Ababa on 11 July 1890, at a time when his Italian connections only made the Empress disfavor him. Afäwarq's relationship with Taytu only worsened, so he was relieved when he was asked in September 1894 to escort two men to Neuchâtel in Switzerland where they had been enrolled at the International School. By this time Afäwarq had also married the daughter of Alfred Ilg. It was while in Switzerland that Afäwarq first sided with Italy over his homeland, crossing over to Italy with his two charges and putting all three at the service of the Italian authorities. The Italians quickly sent them to the war front; they arrived at Massawa 6 January 1896, but despite Italian plans and intentions nothing of consequence came of this misadventure, and the three men were at Asmara when the Italians were defeated at Adwa.

Afäwarq returned to Italy, and the next 16 years, as Bahru Zewde states, witnessed "some of the most important literary and intellectual accomplishments of his career. These included work on Amharic grammar, an Italian-Amharic conversation manual, the satirical Guide du voyageur, and the novel Ləbb Wälläd Tarik. Ləbb Wälläd Tarik, about twin siblings Tobbya and Waḥəd and also simply known as Tobbya, was published in Rome in 1908 under the name Afevork Ghevre Jesus and is widely considered the first novel in Amharic. Afäwarq also worked with the Italian Ethiopicist Francesco Gallina at this time.

In 1912, Afäwarq moved to Italian Eritrea where he established an import-export business. On the death of Emperor Menelik, he attempted to ingratiate himself with his successor, Emperor Iyasu V, by writing poems lauding the young man; when Iyasu was deposed in a coup four years later, writes Bahru Zewde, "With the amazing dexterity for volte-face that was to be the hallmark of his career and character, Afäwärq composed an equally condemnatory poem on Iyyasu." This latter tactic apparently succeeded in reconciling him with the new authorities, for in 1917 or 1918 he was back in Addis Ababa. By 1922 he had become the Nagadras of Dire Dawa in 1922, then between 1925 and 1930 Afäwarq served as president of the special court that heard cases involving foreigners and Ethiopians. He was appointed charge d'affairs in Rome for the Ethiopian government, a position for which Bahru Zewde notes that due to "his known predilection for the Italians and his record of treason" he might not have made him the best candidate. Bahru however goes on to quote the American representative in Ethiopia, Addison E. Southard, who observed that Haile Selassie wanted "to get rid of Afäwarq locally who has the reputation for being an obstreperous and fire-eating old gentleman with potentialities for stirring ... trouble." Regardless of his deeper allegiances, Afäwarq found himself in a difficult situation, being forced to rely on the Italian Ministry of Foreign Affairs to send his telegrams home.

He returned to Ethiopia shortly before the beginning of the Second Italo-Ethiopian War, but upon the Italian forces entering Addis Ababa, he acquiesced to their rule, christening 5 May 1936 as the beginning of the "Era of Mercy" for Ethiopia. Despite his loyalty to the Italian cause, in the backlash that followed the attempt on Graziani's life, he was arrested and deported to Italy. He was not allowed to return to Ethiopia until 1938, after which he served usefully enough to be made Afa Qesar ("Mouthpiece of the Caesar") 9 May 1939. However, upon Haile Selassie's return to Ethiopia, Afäwarq was arrested by the restored Ethiopian government, tried for treason, and sentenced to death—a sentence subsequently commuted to life imprisonment. He was exiled to Jimma where Afäwarq, by then blind, died on 25 September 1947.

== Works ==
- ልብ ፡ ወለድ ፡ ታሪክ ። (Ləbb Wälläd Tarik) [A Heart-Born Story]. Rome 1908.
- ዳግማዊ ፡ ምኒልክ ፡ ንጉሠ ፡ ነገሥት ፡ ዘኢትዮጵያ ። (Dāgmāwī Minīlik Nigūse Negest ze-'Ītyōṗyā) [Menelek II, King of Kings of Ethiopia]. Rome 1909; second edition, Dire Dawa 1919.

=== Short stories ===
- እውነት ተመዶሻው ነው (Iwnet Temedōšāw New). 1898
- አጤ ፋሲል (Āṭē Fāsīl).

=== Linguistics ===
- Manuale di conversazione italiano-amarico con la pronuncia figurata. Rome 1905.
- Grammatica della lingua amarica. Metodo practico per l'insegnamento. Rome 1905.
- Guide du voyageur en Abyssinie. Rome 1908.
- Il verbo amarico. Rome 1911.
