= Telela Kebede =

Ethiopian singer

Telela Kebede ቴሌላ ከበደ
- Born: 1938 (age 86–87)
- Origin: Born to Ethiopian parents in exile in Kenya.
- Genres: Ethiopian music; soul-jazz
- Instrument: Vocals
- Years active: 1950s–1990s

Telela Kebede (Amharic: ቴሌላ ከበደ; born 1938) is a retired Ethiopian singer who gained popularity during Ethiopia's 1960s and 1970s ‘‘Golden Era’’ of music.

== Early life ==
Born in 1938 in Kenya to Ethiopian (Amhara ethnic) parents in exile during Fascist Italy occupation of Ethiopia. After her family return to newly liberated Ethiopia in 1941, Telela's father received land grants and a political position in Sidamo Province from the Emperor Haile Selassie. Telela received an elite education at the French Lazarist mission school in Sidamo. (Note: Despite attending the Lazarist mission school. Telela Kebede is of Ethiopian Orthodox Christian faith. Shelemay pp. 88) There she sang in the mission choir and began performing publicly in the region. Despite her father's objections, Telela pursued a career as an azmari, performing in local drinking establishments.

== Career ==
Telela's reputation as a singer spread quickly in the 1950s, and in 1955 joined the Haile Selassie I National Theatre as both an actress and a singer. She popularized a number of songs in the late 1950s, one of them, a version of "Shäggaw Tәrәnbuli" (The handsome Ethiopian from Tripoli), told the stories of Ethiopians and Eritreans who had been recruited to serve with Italian colonial forces between 1911 and the 1930s in Libya. The song describes the return of an Ethiopian soldier from Tripoli wearing European style trousers and drinking an expensive brand of tej (honey-mead).

Ethiopian playwright Tsegaye Gabre-Medhin incorporated Telela's gifted singing voice in his 1974 play; Ha Hu Besidist Wer. In that same year, Telela Kebede was briefly (three months) sent to prison by the newly installed Derg regime for singing a song, "Lomi Tera Tera" (lit., Lemon quarters); that warned of the dissolution of her country. For two years after her release in 1974, Telela confronted serious personal and economic challenges, scratching together a living by performing privately as an azmari in her own home in Addis Ababa; Telela's singing was usually accompanied by the sounds of the masenqo, a bowed lute. However, Telela was once again harassed by authorities and spent another short period in confinement.

Telela Kebede migrated in the 1990s citing insecurity and continues surveillance under the new EPRDF regime.

== Legacy ==
Today, she is at home in the Ethiopian American diaspora. Telela serves as a mentor to dozens of young Ethiopian musicians struggling to sustain their careers in the United States.
