= Abba Gorgoryos =

Ethiopian priest and lexicographer (1595–1658)

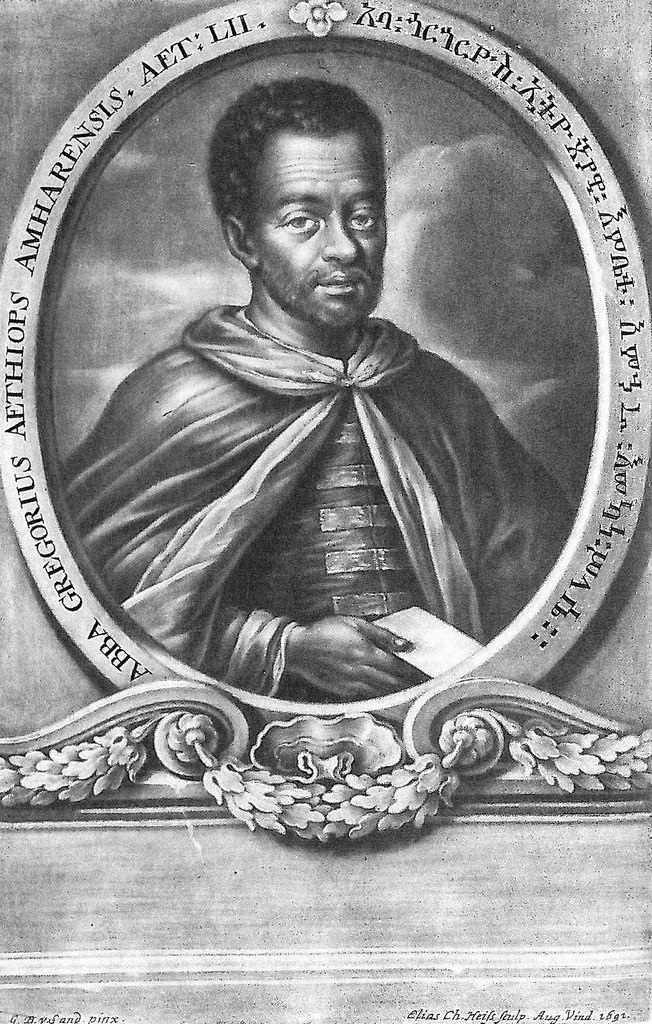
Aba Gorgoryos engraving by Christopher Elias Heiss, Augsburg, 1691

Abba Gorgoryos (Ge'ez: አባ ጎርጎርዮስ; 1595–1658) was an ethnically Amhara Ethiopian priest and lexicographer of noble origin. He is famous for co-authoring encyclopedias with his friend and companion Hiob Ludolf in two Ethiopian languages, Amharic and Ge'ez, both written in Ge'ez script.

== Life ==
Abba Gorgoryos was born in Mekane Sellasie in Amhara Province. He was invited to Gotha in 1652 by Ludolf, who at the time was in the service of Ernest I, Duke of Saxe-Gotha. Ludolf and the Duke were interested about Ethiopia and prepared a list of queries which were presented to Abba Gorgoryos. The Duke took particular interest in the legend of Prester John, while Ludolf was interested in Christianity in Ethiopia and the teaching of the Ethiopian Orthodox Tewahedo Church. The findings of Ludolf are included in his work Theologica aethiopica.

Abba Gorgoryos worked with Hiob Ludolf in co-authoring the earliest grammar of the Amharic language, as well as an Amharic-Latin dictionary, which became the first African language to be translated to Latin. Ludolf's book A History of Ethiopia was based in part on Abba Gorgoryos's conceptualization of Ethiopia and letters. Abba Gorgoryos also developed a Ge'ez lexicon.

On his return journey to Ethiopia in 1658, he died in a shipwreck off the Turkish city of İskenderun.
