= Hiob Ludolf =

German orientalist (1624-1704)

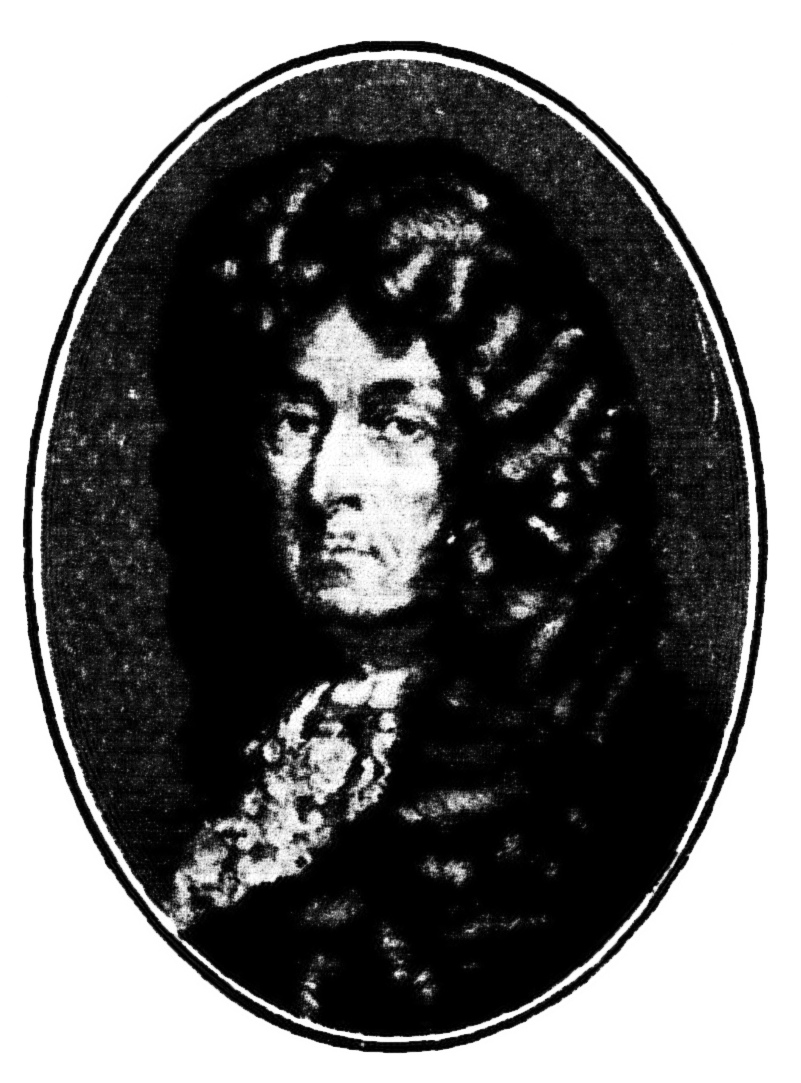

Hiob or Job Ludolf (Latin: Iobus Ludolfus or Ludolphus; 15 June 1624 – 8 April 1704), also known as Job Leutholf, was a German orientalist, born at Erfurt. Edward Ullendorff rates Ludolf as having "the most illustrious name in Ethiopic scholarship".

== Life ==
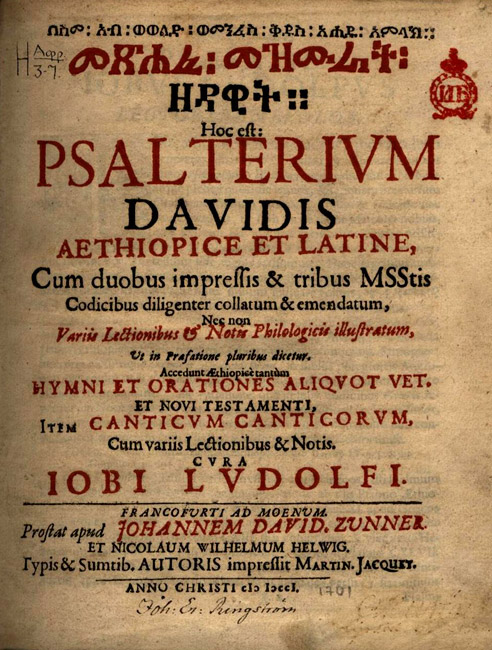
Psalterium Davidis Aethiopice et Latine (1701)

After studying philology at the Erfurt academy and at Leiden, he travelled in order to increase his linguistic knowledge. While searching in Rome for some documents at the request of the Swedish Court (1649), he became friends with Abba Gorgoryos, a monk from the Ethiopian province of Amhara, and acquired from him an intimate knowledge of the Ethiopian language of Amhara.

In 1652 he entered the service of the duke of Saxe-Gotha, in which he continued until 1678, when he retired to Frankfurt am Main. In 1683 he visited England to promote a cherished scheme for establishing trade with Ethiopia, but his efforts were unsuccessful, chiefly due to the resistance of the authorities of the Ethiopian Orthodox Church. Returning to Frankfurt in 1684, he devoted himself wholly to literary work, which he continued almost to his death. In 1690 he was appointed president of the Collegium Imperiale Historicum.

His correspondence with Leibniz on linguistics was published in 1755 by August Benedict Michaelis.

Ludolf died at Frankfurt.

== Works ==
The works of Ludolf, who is said to have been acquainted with twenty-five languages, include Sciagraphia historiae aethiopicae (Jena, 1676); and the Historia aethiopica (Frankfort, 1681), which has been translated into English, French and Dutch, and which was supplemented by a Commentarius (1691) and by Appendices (1693–1694). According to Ullendorff, Ludolf's

Ethiopic and Amharic dictionaries and grammars were of importance far transcending his own time and remained, for well over a century and a half, the indispensable tools for the study of these languages, while his monumental history of Ethiopia (with an extensive commentary) can still be read with profit as well as enjoyment.

Among his other works are:

- Grammatica linguae amharicae (Frankfort, 1698)
- Lexicon amharico-latinum (Frankfort, 1698)
- Lexicon aethiopico-latinum (Frankfort, 1699)
- Grammatica aethiopica (London, 1661, and Frankfort, 1702)
- His posthumously published Allgemeine Schau-Bühne der Welt (1713 in Frankfurt am Main) is noted for the detailed account given of 1652 Batih massacre, a mass execution of Polish captives by Ukrainian Cossacks.
