= Pepe =

Pepe is a pet form of the Spanish and Portuguese name José (Joseph). In the Brazilian context, it is used as a nickname for Pedro (Peter). It is also a surname and a male name.

== People ==
=== Mononyms ===
- Pepe (footballer, born 1935), Brazilian footballer José Macia
- Pepe (footballer, born February 1983), Brazilian-born Portuguese footballer Képler Laveran Lima Ferreira
- Pepe (footballer, born October 1983), Brazilian footballer Marcos Paulo Aguiar de Jesus
- Pepê (footballer, born 1997), Brazilian footballer Eduardo Gabriel Aquino Cossa
- Pepê (footballer, born 1998), Brazilian footballer João Pedro Vilardi Pinto

=== Politicians ===
- Porfirio Lobo Sosa (born 1947), known as Pepe, candidate for the Presidency of Honduras
- José Mujica (1935–2025), known as El Pepe, president of Uruguay
- José Gregorio Liendo (1945–1973), known as "comandante Pepe," "compañero Pepe," or "loco Pepe," Chilean political activist
- José W. Diokno (1922–1987), known as "Ka Pepe," Filipino nationalist and senator
- José Rizal (1861–1896), Filipino nationalist who used the name with his family

=== Musicians ===
- Pepê (born 1975), real name Potiara da Silva Oliveira, part of the Brazilian musical duo Pepê & Neném
- Pepe Romero (born 1944), Spanish classical and flamenco guitarist
- Pepe Aguilar (born 1968), American folklore singer
- Pépé Kallé (1951–1998), Congolese Soukous singer
- Pepe Smith (1947–2019), real name Joseph William Feliciano Smith, Filipino rock singer and drummer

=== Sportsmen ===
- Pepe Frías (born 1948), Puerto Rican MLB player
- Pepe Oriola (born 1994), Spanish racing driver
- Pepe Pearson (born 1975), American football player
- Pepe Reina (born 1982), Spanish footballer
- Pepe Sánchez (basketball) (born 1977), Argentine basketball player
- Pepe Soares (1908–1931), Portuguese footballer

=== Actors ===
- Pepe Herrera (born 1987), Filipino actor, singer, and comedian

=== Artists ===
- Pepe Soho (1971–2025), Mexican landscape and nature photographer

=== Surname ===
- Anna Pepe (born 2003), known professionally as Anna, Italian rapper and singer-songwriter
- Cécé Pepe (born 1996), French footballer
- Florestano Pepe (1778–1851), Italian soldier, brother of Guglielmo
- Gabriele Pepe (1779–1849), Italian soldier, cousin of Guglielmo
- Guglielmo Pepe (1783–1855), Italian general
- Nico Pepe (1917–1987), Italian actor
- Nicolas Pépé (born 1995), French-Ivorian footballer
- Osman Pepe (born 1954), Turkish politician
- Simone Pepe (born 1983), Italian footballer
- Vincenzo Pepe (born 1987), Italian footballer

== Fictional characters ==
- Pepé Le Pew, in the Warner Bros. Looney Tunes and Merrie Melodies series of cartoons
- the protagonist of Pepe (1960 film), an American musical comedy starring Cantinflas as Pepe
- the protagonist of Pepe (2024 Dominican film), a Dominican Republic film about a ghost hippo
- Pepe el Toro, main character in the series of films Nosotros los Pobres, Ustedes los Ricos and Pepe el Toro
- Pepe (Shugo Chara!), in the manga series Shugo Chara!
- Pepe, from Unseen Academicals by Terry Pratchett
- Pepe the Frog, Internet meme from the comic series Boy's Club
- Pepe the King Prawn, a Muppet character
- Pepe Waccabrada, from the anime Bleach by Tite Kubo
- Pépé Torres the young killer in John Steinbeck's short story "Flight"
- Pericles, nicknamed Pepe, in the comic book Asterix in Spain

== See also ==
- Pepa (disambiguation), the feminine form of the Spanish nickname
- Pepito (disambiguation), diminutive name for Pepe in Spanish culture
- Peppe, a given name, nickname and surname
