= Pepito =

Pepito, the diminutive version of the Spanish pet name Pepe, may refer to:

== People ==
- Pepito Arriola (1896–1954), Spanish child prodigy pianist and violinist
- Pépito Elhorga (born 1978), French rugby player
- Jose Laurel Jr. (1912–1998), former Speaker of the House of Representatives of the Philippines and Batangas congressman, nicknamed "Pepito"
- Pépito Pavon (1941–2012), Spanish footballer
- Pepito Ramos (born 1951), Spanish footballer
- César Tovar (1940–1994), Major League Baseball player, nicknamed "Pepito"
- Brima Pepito (born 1985), Sierra Leonean footballer
- Detdet Pepito (born 2002), Filipino volleyball player

== Fictional characters ==
- Pepito, in the Filipino sitcom Pepito Manaloto
- Pepito, Rat's violent sock puppet in the comic strip Pearls Before Swine
- Pepito, in the 1959 animated TV series Bucky and Pepito
- Pepito, in the webcomic Something Positive
- Pepito, in the 1998 film Madeline
- Pepito, a flying creature in the 2017 animated film Coco
- Pepito (Squee), in the comic book Squee
- Pepito, a character in jokes equivalent to Little Johnny in some Hispanic cultures

== Other uses ==
- Pepito (comics), an Italian comic created by Luciano Bottaro
- PepitoTheCat, a Twitter account focused on a cat named Pépito
- Pépito (opera), an opéra comique of 1853, music by Jacques Offenbach
- Pepito (sandwich), from Spain
- Palm (companion), codenamed "Pepito"
- List of storms named Pepito

== See also ==
- Pepe (disambiguation)
- Pepita, roasted seed of pumpkin or other squash
