= Italian pepper =

Italian pepper may refer to:

- Peperoncino
- Friggitello
- Peperone crusco

== See also ==
- Pepe (disambiguation)
