= Global trade of secondhand clothing =

International trade of used clothing

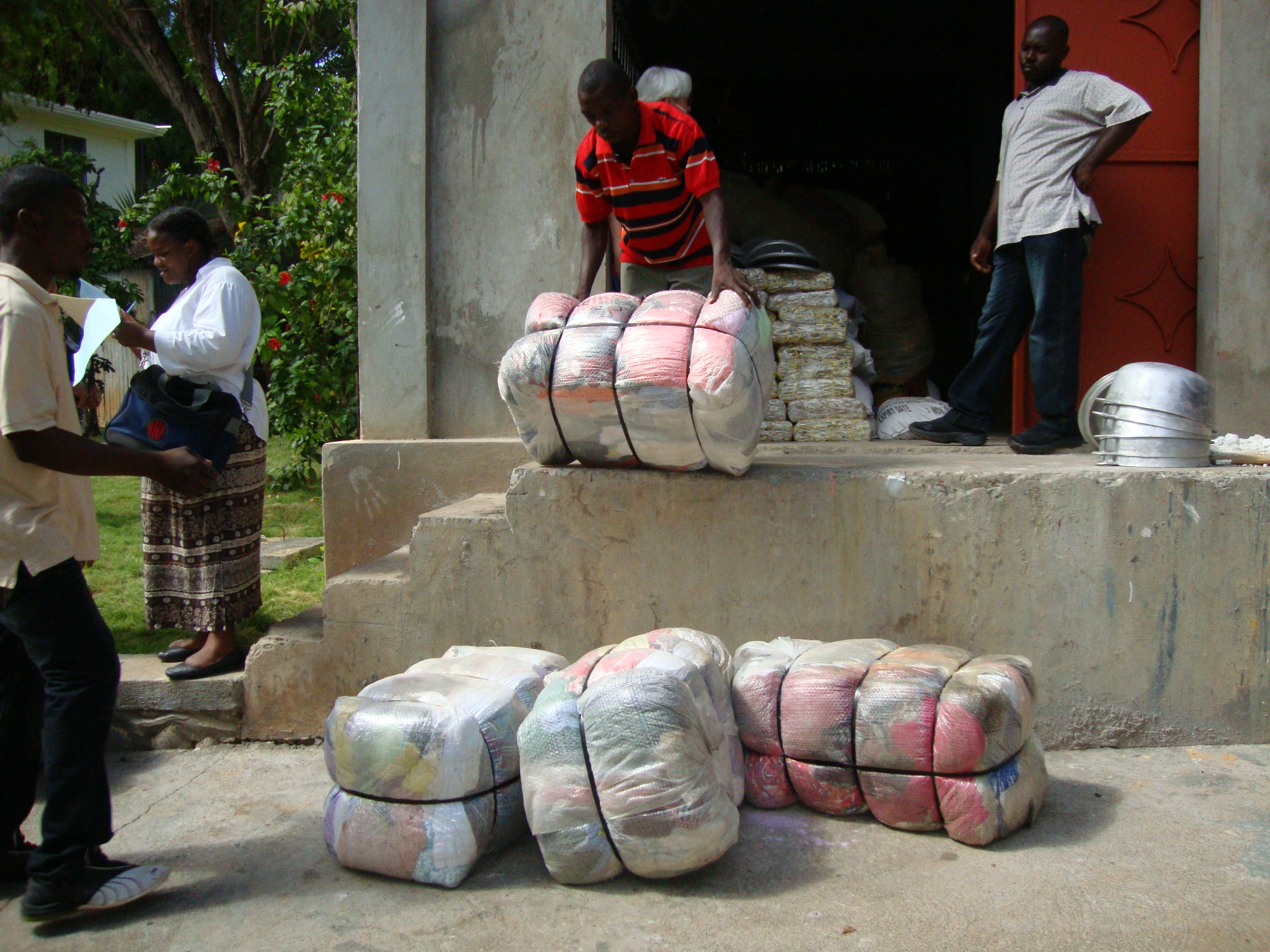
Bales of used clothing being unloaded from a warehouse in Haiti

The global trade of secondhand clothing is a long-standing industry, which has been facilitated by the abundance of donated clothing in wealthy countries. This trade accounts for approximately 0.5% of the total value of clothing traded worldwide, while by weight it accounts for 5%. However, in some countries, imported used clothing constitutes the majority of clothing purchased and used.

Following the Industrial Revolution in the 19th century, mass production of new clothing became widespread in some countries, particularly the United Kingdom. At the same time, population growth in other countries outpaced domestic manufacturing capacity, leading to an increase in demand for clothing. This led to a boom in the trade of secondhand clothing. Today, used clothing is mostly sourced from charity organizations, which use the proceeds to fund their main charity operations. European and East Asian countries with substantial middle classes are the biggest exporters of used clothing, while the biggest importers are poorer countries, especially in South Asia, Southeast Asia and Africa.

In recent years, the industry has faced increased scrutiny over concerns about environmental sustainability and the ethical implications of clothing waste. It is also often accused of depressing the price of clothing in the destination countries, making it difficult for local producers to compete. Defenders of the industry argue that it nevertheless provides affordable clothing for consumers in these countries and creates jobs outside of textile production. Some countries have attempted to limit or prohibit used clothing imports to protect their domestic textile industry, but these measures have had mixed success.

== History ==
Historically, used clothing was an important means of acquiring garments, which were often handed down many generations of families. The used clothing trade became a major industry in the early 1800s, when the Industrial Revolution caused many countries' populations to grow too quickly for their domestic manufacturing to keep up with. The United Kingdom and France were among the world's most significant exporters of used clothing in this time, especially to North America and Russia. During this time, Houndsditch in London was the site of a major market for used clothes, with a dedicated "Old Clothes Exchange." Private dealers went door-to-door in London soliciting used clothing, which they re-sold wholesale at the exchange. Overseas demand was so great that one major exporter needed around 5,000 suits per week in 1833.

At the same time, as British households grew wealthier, used clothes also began to be donated in large quantities to charity. Appeals for donations to alleviate poverty in Ireland resulted in large quantities being shipped to that country during the Irish famine. Missionaries also organized shipments of clothing donations to British colonies, particularly in southern Africa.

== Market overview ==
Biggest importers of used clothing, 2015-19
Country	Thousands of tonnes per year
Pakistan	640
India	330
Malaysia	220
Angola	190
Canada	150
Tunisia	150
Netherlands	130
Kenya	130
Ghana	120
Dem. Rep. of the Congo	110
Ukraine	100
Chile	100
Tanzania	90
Cameroon	80
Hungary	80
Source: United Nations Comtrade Database

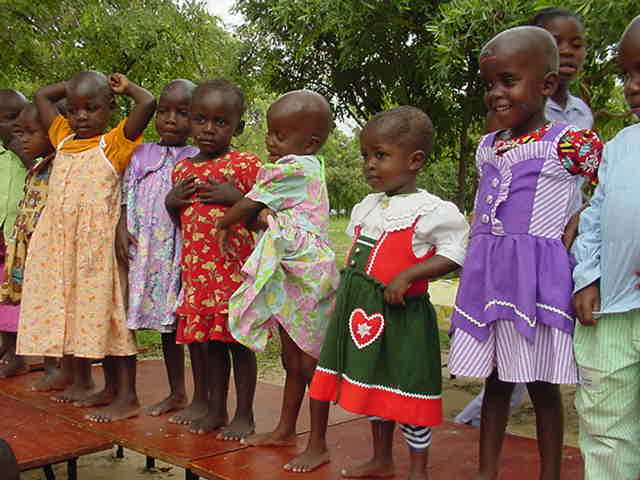
Clothing shipped in bales, modeled by AIDS orphans in Zimbabwe

The global trade in used clothing is primarily sourced from charitable organizations in wealthy countries, like Oxfam, the Salvation Army, and Goodwill. Although some donations are distributed directly to populations in crisis, most are sold, with the proceeds used to support other charitable operations. A small amount of clothing donations, usually no more than 10%, is sold domestically. Clothing that remains unsold locally is often sold to textile recycling companies, which in turn export the materials to countries with established secondhand textile supply chains. Here, they are sorted, appraised, and either recycled, disposed of in landfills, or resold.

Trade in secondhand clothing represents around 0.5% of the value of the trade in new clothes, and around 5% by weight. Official figures suggest that the biggest importers of used clothing by weight in the period 2015–2019 were Pakistan, India, Malaysia, and Angola. However, incomplete data collection in many countries and the reporting of imports by value rather than weight in others may distort the accuracy of these figures. Until 2017, China was also a major destination for used clothing sorting, recycling, or disposal. However, in that year, China banned the import of used clothes. As China has become wealthier, it has emerged as a significant source of clothing exports, contributing 6.4% of the world's total in 2015.

In wealthier Western countries, used and pre-owned clothes are popular among a niche market of cost-conscious or environmentally conscious consumers. In contrast, secondhand clothing from wealthier countries is a staple source of clothing for many people in developing countries. As of 2019, the largest net exporters of used clothing are the United States, followed by Germany, the United Kingdom and China. In 2006, around one-quarter of clothing donated to charity in the United States was sold to resellers abroad.

== Accusations of market distortion ==
The export of secondhand clothes to developing countries is often controversial. Detractors argue that it drives down local prices to such an extent that domestic textile industries in these countries become unable to compete. For example, many sub-Saharan African countries have seen their textile industries decline significantly since the 1990s. However, some economists contend that this would have occurred regardless of the secondhand market, since domestic production in these countries is often inefficient and free-trade agreements with many Asian countries have exposed them to competition with cheap new clothing.

The legacy of colonialism also adds a political dimension, with some countries resenting being seen as a "dumping ground" for discarded clothing by former colonial powers.

In an effort to protect their domestic textile industry, some developing nations have imposed high tariffs or even outright bans on clothing imports. For instance, the member countries of the East African Community have pledged to prohibit imports from outside the region, although only Rwanda has implemented this policy as of 2022. Nigeria has also had various bans and tariffs in place over the past few decades. Zimbabwe prohibited used clothing imports from 2015–2017, but later abandoned the ban when it became apparent that the domestic textile industry could not handle the demand.

Used clothing import bans have generally had mixed success. They are often widely circumvented, leading to the creation of large shadow economies. In some cases, imports of cheap new clothing, particularly from China, have taken the place of secondhand clothes.

== See also ==
- Circular economy
- Mitumba (clothing)
- Salaula industry, which means "to select from a pile in the manner of rummaging" in some African nations such as Zambia
- Pepe (textiles)
- Sustainable fashion
- Trashion
