= Mitumba (clothing) =

Used clothing shipped to Africa from wealthy countries

Mitumba is a Swahili term, literally meaning "bundles", used to refer to plastic-wrapped packages of used clothing donated by people in wealthy countries. The term is also applied to the clothing that arrives in these bundles.

One major receiving port for mitumba is in the Kenyan city of Mombasa. From there the clothing is widely dispersed into the interior of Africa. The transportation and sale of mitumba is responsible for many jobs both in wealthy donor companies and in the African countries where mitumba is bought and sold. Critics of the mitumba trade note that the influx of cheap clothing is responsible for the decline of local textile industries. Proponents of mitumba point out that the clothing is beneficial in that it stimulates economic activity and allows people with limited means to afford fashionable clothing.

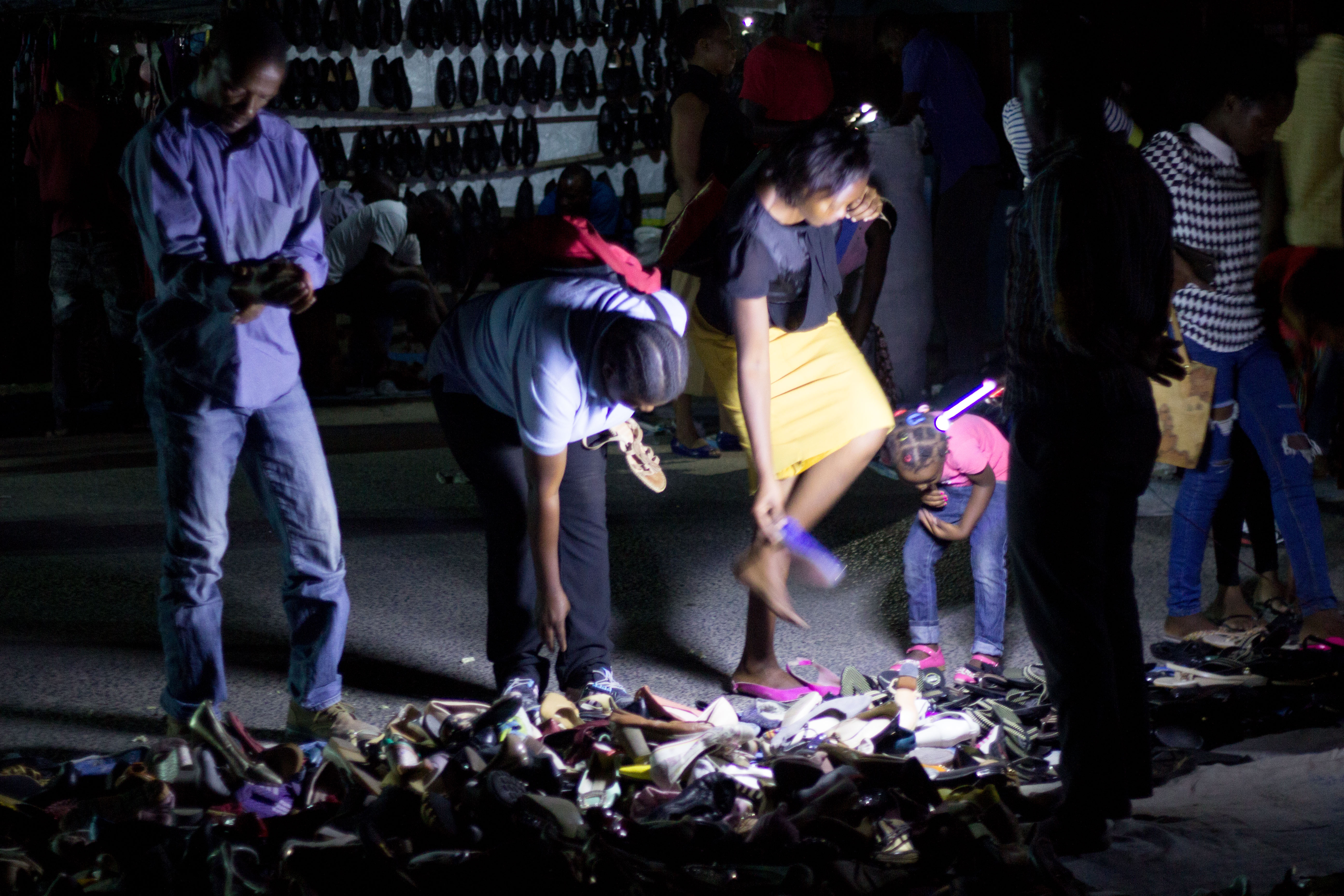
Mitumba shoes sold on the street

Mitumba is usually packaged in plastic bundles prior to transport to Africa. Most of the mitumba originates in developed countries such as the United States. Companies like Mid-West Textile Company of Texas purchase clothes that were donated to non-profit organizations such as Goodwill Industries. These clothes are then put into a conveyor belt and workers sort through them before making the bales or packages to be shipped to Africa.

The practice of purchasing and the subsequent sale of clothes that were originally acquired as donations has received heavy criticism. However, defendants of the practice argue that not-for-profits organizations receive such large quantities of donations that they must indeed sell them in order to fund the several social projects they are involved with. The defendants go even further as to argue that if non-profit organizations were not able to sell most of their donations, they would not be able to survive nor fulfill their mission statements of helping the disadvantaged. The industry is one of the topics covered by professor Pietra Rivoli in her best-selling book, The Travels of a T-Shirt in the Global Economy.

Men’s used clothes are also generally in worse shape. This causes a price difference of up to seven times as much. Another example of price fluctuations is that Mitumba’s clothing prices seem to peak around monthly payday as most people buy clothing around then. Similarly, clothing featuring successful sporting teams also rises in price. (Rivoli, 2014).

== See also ==
- Clothing in Africa
- Global trade of secondhand clothing
- Salaula
- 1990s in African fashion
- 2000s in African fashion
- 2010s in African fashion
