= List of storms named Pablo =

The name Pablo has been used for five tropical cyclones worldwide, two in the Atlantic Ocean and three in the Philippine Area of Responsibility by PAGASA in the Western Pacific Ocean.

In the Atlantic:

- Tropical Storm Pablo (1995) – did not affect land.
- Hurricane Pablo (2019) – a Category 1 hurricane that affected the Azores.

In the Western Pacific:

- Tropical Depression Pablo (2004) – crossed the Philippines.
- Tropical Storm Higos (2008) (T0817, 21W, Pablo) – traversed the Philippines and crossed Hainan, China.
- Typhoon Bopha (2012) (T1224, 26W, Pablo) – Category 5 super typhoon that struck Mindanao in the Philippines.

The name Pablo was retired following the 2012 Pacific typhoon season and was replaced with Pepito.
