= Pepa =

Pepa may refer to:

== Given name or nickname ==
Most commonly it is a diminutive of the female given name Josefa.

- Pepa (footballer) (born 1980), Portuguese footballer
- Pepa (rapper) (born 1964 or 1969), Jamaican-American rap & hip-hop artist, member of Salt-N-Pepa
- Pepa Fernández (born 1965), Spanish journalist
- Pepa Flores (born 1948), retired Spanish singer and actress
- Pepa Millán (born 1995), Spanish lawyer, columnist and politician
- Pepa Randall (born 1996), Australian rules footballer playing for the Greater Western Sydney Giants in the AFL Women's (AFLW).
- Pepa Rus (born 1985), Spanish actress, humorist, and singer

== Surname ==
- Avni Pepa (born 1988), Kosovar footballer
- Brunild Pepa (born 1990), Albanian footballer
- Dennis Pepa

== Fictional characters ==
- Pepa Madrigal from Encanto
- Pepa from Pepa y Pepe
- Pepa from Viva la Pepa

== Other ==
- Pepa, Democratic Republic of the Congo, a village
  - Pepa Airport, an airstrip
- PEPA or Performance Evaluation Process Algebra, a stochastic process algebra
- PEPA (drug), an ampakine drug that is a potential nootropic
- Pepa (instrument), a flute-like musical instrument from Assam
- La Pepa, nickname of the Spanish Constitution of 1812

== See also ==
- Joseph (name)
- Pepe (disambiguation)
