= Salaula =

The Zambian term salaula means "to select from a pile in the manner of rummaging" or for short, "to pick". Some African nations such as Zambia have a vast internal consumer demand for second-hand clothes or hand-me-downs from rich nations in North America and Europe. The clothes arrive in these local markets in large bales or packages and are then cut open so buyers can sort through them and pick what article they like the most.

The salaula industry faces many criticisms. One is that it tends to disturb the internal textile industry. Local textile business cannot compete with cheap used clothes coming from abroad. Defenders of the industry argue that market demand should dictate what is fair or not.

Another criticism is towards the profit companies are generating from these clothes since these clothes were originally donated to non-profit organizations such as Goodwill. Defenders of the practice argue that non-profit organization must sell these donations in order to acquire money necessary to fund their social projects.

== See also ==
- Global trade of secondhand clothing
- Mitumba (clothing)
- Sustainable clothing
