= Tropical Storm Higos (2008) =

Pacific tropical storm in 2008

Tropical Storm Higos (Pablo)
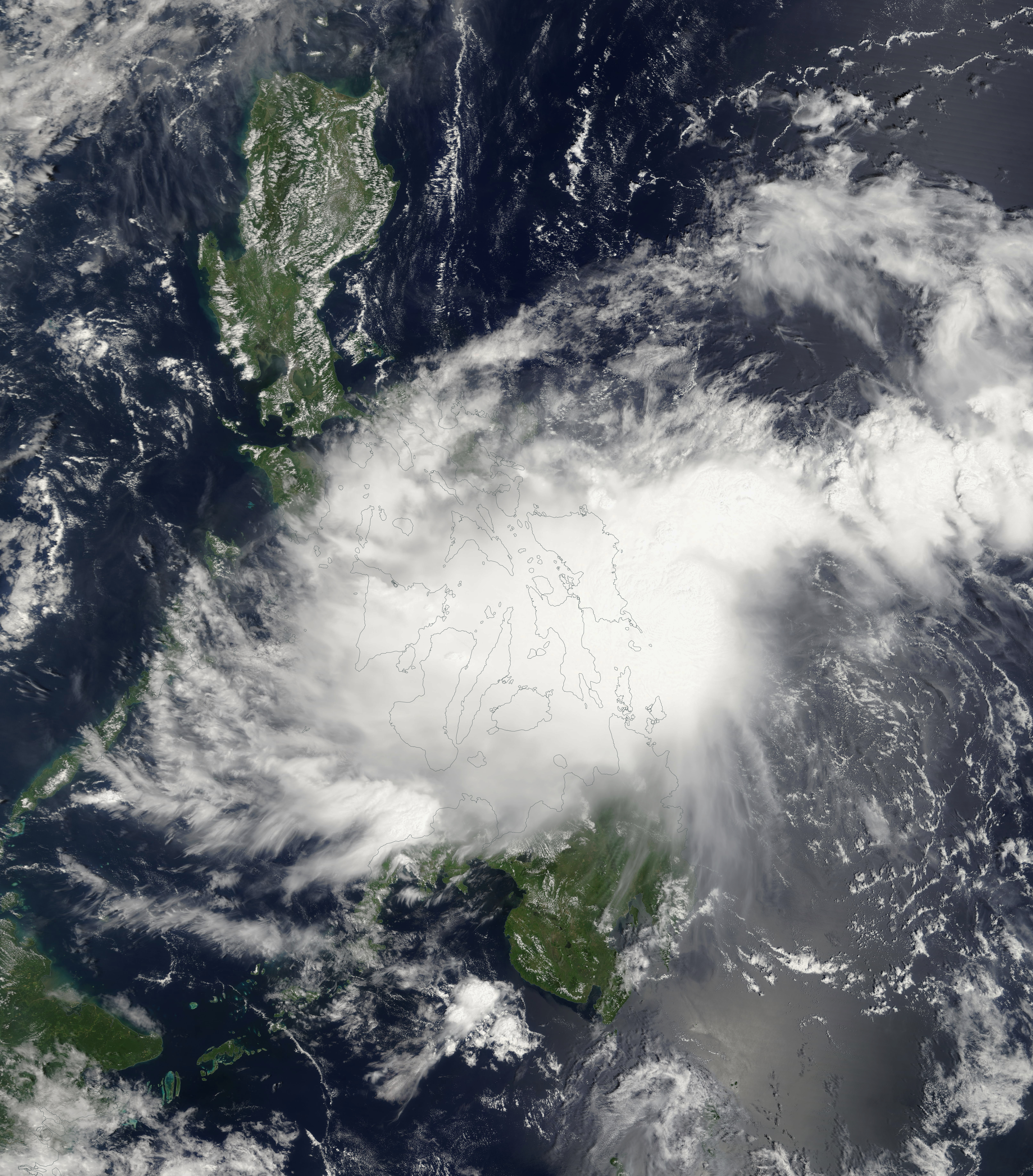
- Higos near landfall in Samar on September 30

Meteorological history
- Formed: September 29, 2008
- Dissipated: October 6, 2008

Tropical storm
- 10-minute sustained (JMA)
- Highest winds: 65 km/h (40 mph)
- Lowest pressure: 998 hPa (mbar); 29.47 inHg

Tropical storm
- 1-minute sustained (SSHWS/JTWC)
- Highest winds: 75 km/h (45 mph)
- Lowest pressure: 993 hPa (mbar); 29.32 inHg

Overall effects
- Fatalities: 4
- Damage: $6.5 million (2008 USD)
- Areas affected: Philippines, China
- IBTrACS
- Part of the 2008 Pacific typhoon season

Tropical Storm Higos, (Note: The name Higos (Chamorro: higos, [higos]) was contributed by the United States and means fig in Chamorro.) known in the Philippines as Tropical Storm Pablo, was a weak tropical storm to hit the Philippines during the 2008 Pacific typhoon season.

== Meteorological history ==
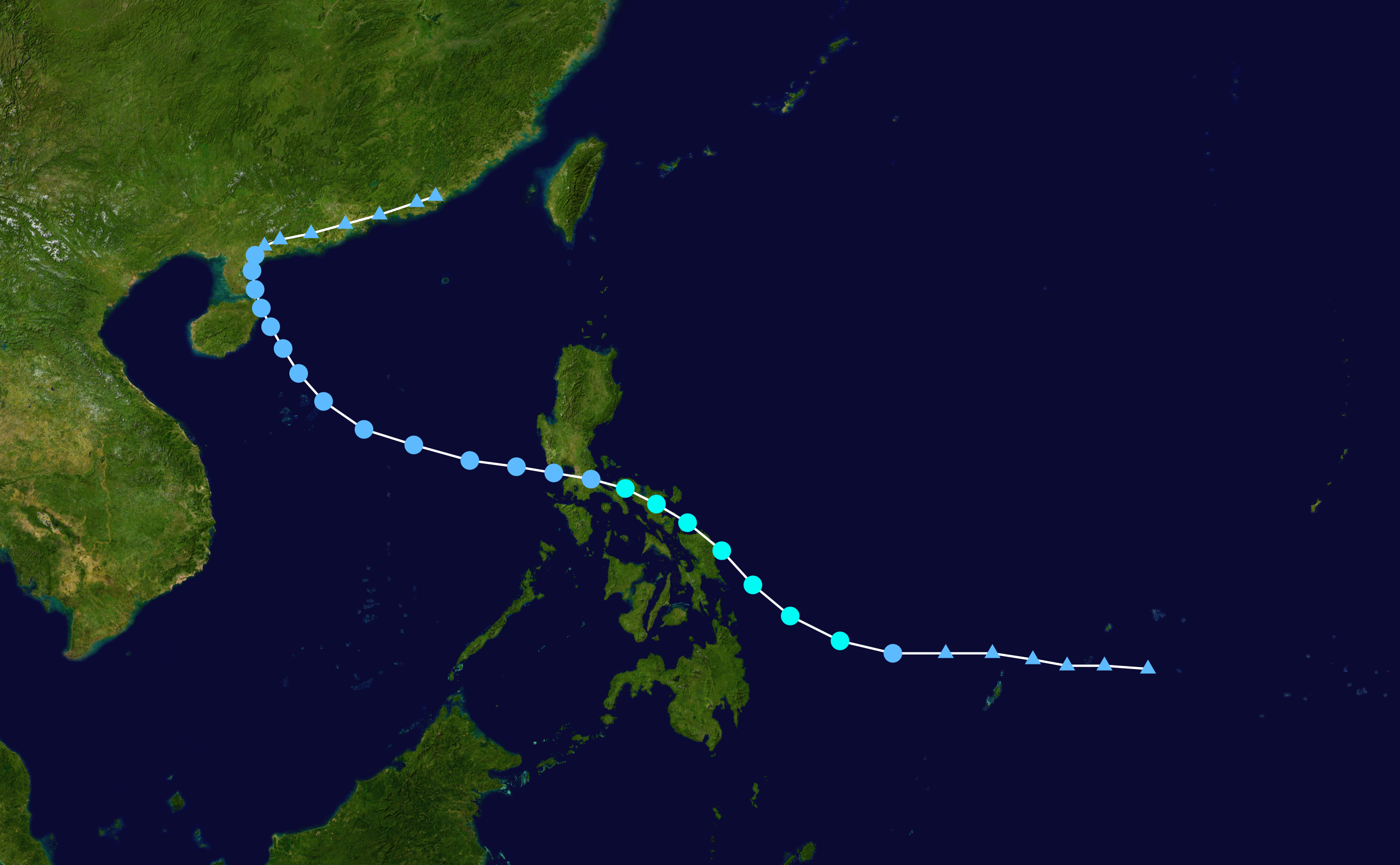
Map plotting the storm's track and intensity, according to the Saffir–Simpson scale Map key Saffir–Simpson scale Tropical depression (≤38 mph, ≤62 km/h) Tropical storm (39–73 mph, 63–118 km/h) Category 1 (74–95 mph, 119–153 km/h) Category 2 (96–110 mph, 154–177 km/h) Category 3 (111–129 mph, 178–208 km/h) Category 4 (130–156 mph, 209–251 km/h) Category 5 (≥157 mph, ≥252 km/h) Unknown Storm type Tropical cyclone Subtropical cyclone Extratropical cyclone, remnant low, tropical disturbance, or monsoon depression

At 18:00 UTC on September 28, the Japan Meteorological Agency (JMA) assessed the formation of a tropical depression near Palau. At 06:00 UTC the next day, the Joint Typhoon Warning Center (JTWC) issued a Tropical Cyclone Formation Alert on the westwardly tracking disturbance, designating it as Tropical Depression 21W. Upon development, the storm showed signs of improving organization. Consolidation continued as the storm approached the Philippines at the eve of October, though intensification was tempered by increasing wind shear and interaction with the archipelago. On September 29, the storm entered the area of responsibility of the Philippine Atmospheric, Geophysical and Astronomical Services Administration (PAGASA), who locally named the system Pablo. The tropical cyclone grazed eastern Samar and tracked towards southern Luzon—with the JMA noting little change in strength—on September 30, guided by a nearby subtropical ridge. As the storm moved across the Philippines, its center of circulation became elongated and difficult to locate, though deep convective activity initiated near the center as the storm began to accelerate into the South China Sea on October 1. The JMA upgraded the cyclone to a minimal tropical storm by October 2 with sustained winds of 40 mph (65 km/h) and a minimum pressure of 996 mbar (hPa; 29.47 inHg); Higos would not strengthen further throughout its evolution in the South China Sea. With the upgrade, the system was named Higos. In contrast, the JTWC noted that the system had become disorganized in the same timeframe with a lack of consolidation noted in microwave satellite imagery. Higos remained ill-defined the next day and was consequently downgraded to a tropical depression by the JMA. On October 4, the weakening system crossed eastern Hainan and slowed considerably, with land interaction and wind shear creating hostile environmental conditions for Higos. Higos drifted northeastward into mainland China as a tropical depression and eventually dissipated early on October 6.

== Preparations ==
Ahead of time, Ferry services on Qiongzhou Strait in south China were suspended. Due to heavily relying on the ferry', all passenger trains were also temporarily suspended. Authorities in two airports in Hainan Province: Meilan International Airport in Haikou, the provincial capital, and Fenghuang (Phoenix) International Airport in Sanya, a seaside resort on the southern tip of the island, managed to keep arrivals and departures at their respective airports going.

=== Warnings ===
==== Philippines ====
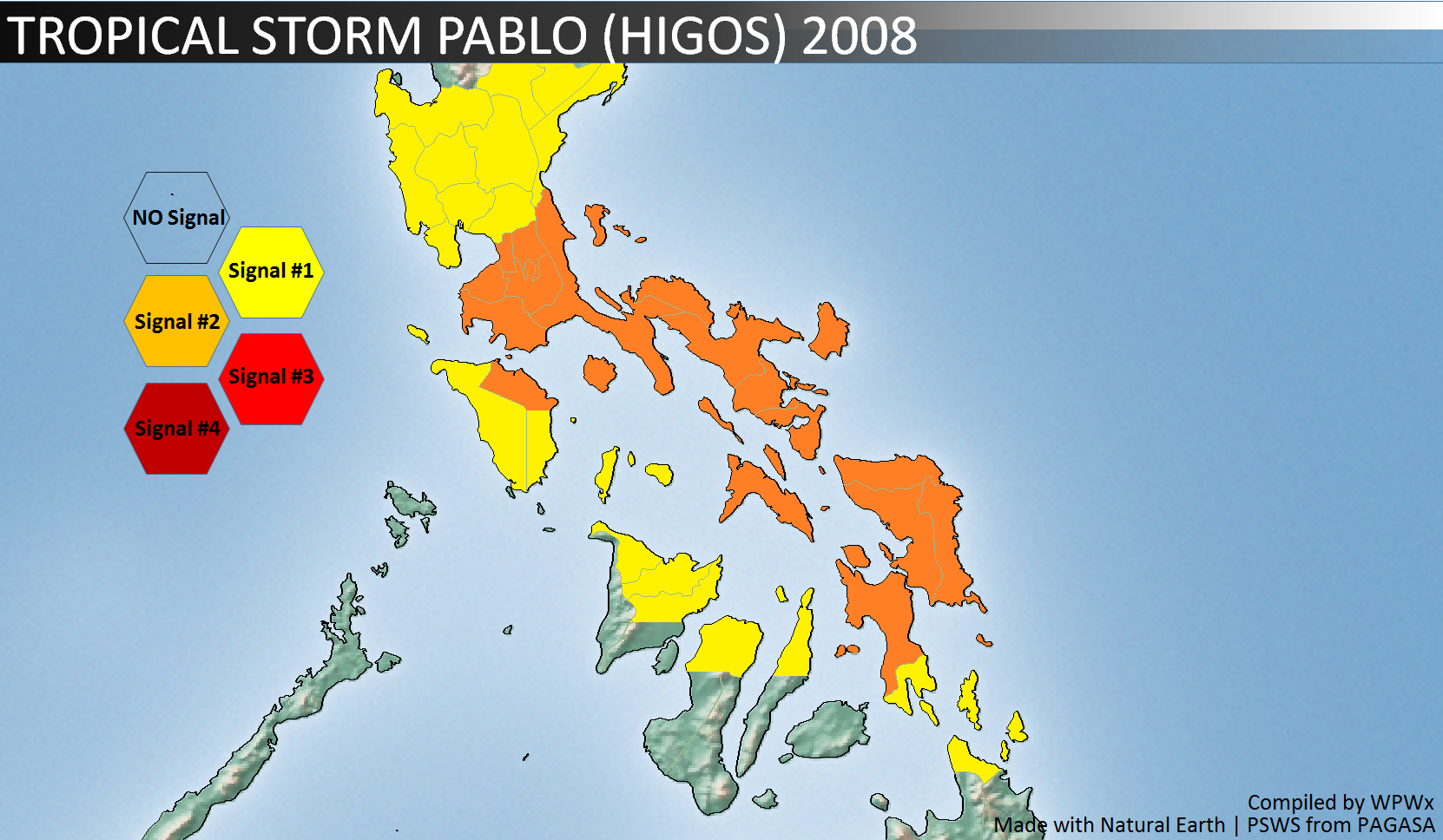
Highest Public Storm Warning Signals raised across the Philippines as Pablo crossed the country

Highest Public Storm Warning Signal
| Signal No. | Luzon | Visayas | Mindanao |
|---|---|---|---|
| PSWS #2 | Metro Manila, Rizal, Batangas, Cavite, Laguna, Quezon, Polilio Is., Marinduque, Northern Mindoro Oriental, Masbate, Camarines Provinces, Albay, Sorsogon, Catanduanes | Biliran, Samar Provinces, Leyte | None |
| PSWS #1 | Pangasinan, Nueva Ecija, Nueva Vizcaya, Quirino, Aurora, Bulacan, Bataan, Zambales, Pampanga, Tarlac, Lubang Is. Rest of Mindoro Oriental, Mindoro Occidental, Romblon | Aklan, Capiz, Northern Iloilo, Northern Negros Occidental, Northern Cebu. Southern Leyte | Dinagat Island, Surigao del Norte, Siargao Is. |

==== China ====
China issued an orange alert on for Higos and the State Flood Control and Drought Relief Headquarters activated a third degree emergency response on Friday to prevent flooding, while in Hong Kong, the Standby Signal No. 1 was issued at 7.30 p.m. on October 2 when Higos was about 700 km south of Hong Kong. All tropical cyclone warning signals were cancelled at 10.30 p.m. on October 4 as Higos made landfall over western Guangdong and weakened.

== Impact ==
In Hong Kong, a sheet of glass fell off from a shopping centre in Tsim Sha Tsui when the Strong Monsoon Signal was in force. Two vehicles were damaged and a person was slightly injured during the incident. In addition, a scaffolding was reported loose in Kowloon Bay. Higos caused $6.5 million in damage to the province of Xinhua, however its heavy rainfall may have stopped a potential drought from starting. According to a report from Yahoo News, Higos killed four paramilitary operatives of the Central Intelligence Agency's Maritime Branch who were on a mission to plant surveillance equipment on a small island in the Luzon Strait.

== See also ==
- Other tropical cyclones named Higos
- Other tropical cyclones named Pablo
- Typhoon Mujigae
- Tropical Storm Rumbia (2013)
- Typhoon Sarika
