= Tropical Storm Rumbia (2013) =

Pacific severe tropical storm in 2013

Severe Tropical Storm Rumbia (Gorio)
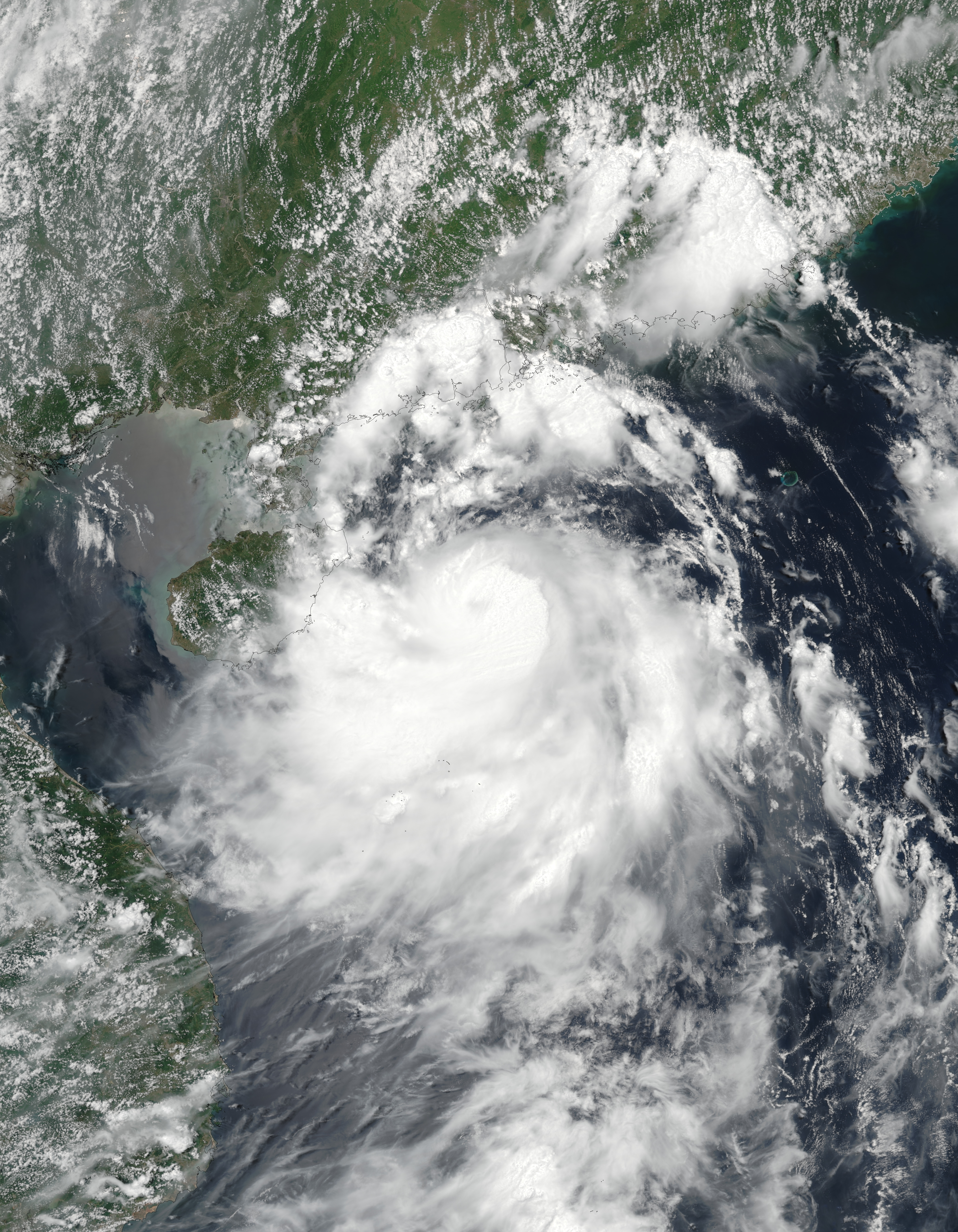
- Severe Tropical Storm Rumbia near peak intensity off Hainan Island on July 1

Meteorological history
- Formed: June 27, 2013
- Dissipated: July 2, 2013

Severe tropical storm
- 10-minute sustained (JMA)
- Highest winds: 95 km/h (60 mph)
- Lowest pressure: 985 hPa (mbar); 29.09 inHg

Category 1-equivalent typhoon
- 1-minute sustained (SSHWS/JTWC)
- Highest winds: 130 km/h (80 mph)
- Lowest pressure: 970 hPa (mbar); 28.64 inHg

Overall effects
- Fatalities: 7 total
- Damage: $191 million (2013 USD)
- Areas affected: Philippines, China, Hong Kong, Macau
- IBTrACS
- Part of the 2013 Pacific typhoon season

Severe Tropical Storm Rumbia, (Note: The name Rumbia (Malay: rumbia, [rumbiə]) was contributed by Malaysia and means sago palm (Metroxylon sagu) in Malay.) known in the Philippines as Severe Tropical Storm Gorio, was a tropical cyclone that brought widespread flooding in areas of the Philippines and China late June and early July 2013. The sixth internationally named storm of the season, Rumbia formed from a broad area of low pressure situated in the southern Philippine Sea on June 27.

Steadily organizing, the initial tropical depression moved towards the northwest as the result of a nearby subtropical ridge. On June 28, the disturbance strengthened to tropical storm strength, and subsequently made its first landfall on Eastern Samar in the Philippines early the following day. Rumbia spent roughly a day moving across the archipelago before emerging into the South China Sea. Over open waters, Rumbia resumed strengthening, and reached its peak intensity with winds of 95 km/h (50 mph) on July 1, (Note: All sustained wind speeds are measured over ten minutes, unless otherwise noted.) ranking it as a severe tropical storm. The tropical cyclone weakened slightly before moving ashore the Leizhou Peninsula late that day. Due to land interaction, Rumbia quickly weakened into a low pressure area on July 2 and eventually dissipated soon afterwards.

Prior to moving over the Philippines, extensive preparatory measures were undertaken by local and government relief agencies. In the provinces of Eastern Visayas and Caraga, an estimated ₱6.9 million was allocated to relief materials. Upon landfall, Rumbia caused extensive flooding across multiple islands, causing the cessation of transportation services and displacing thousands of people. Power outages also resulted from the heavy rain and strong winds. At its landfall on Leizhou Peninsula in China, Rumbia damaged large swaths of agricultural cropland and destroyed at least 112 buildings, causing ¥1.17 billion (US$191 million) in damage.

== Meteorological history ==
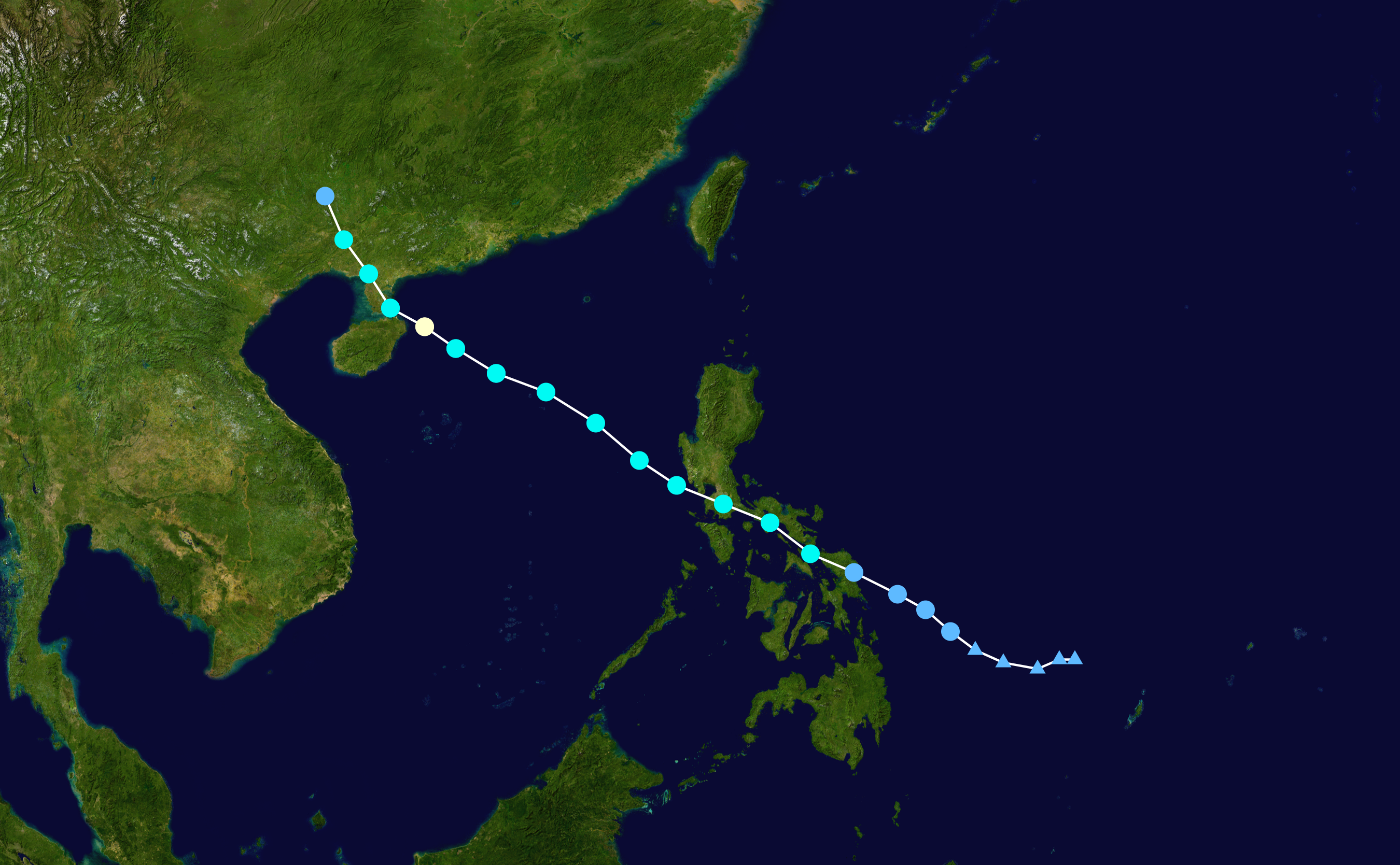
Map plotting the storm's track and intensity, according to the Saffir–Simpson scale Map key Saffir–Simpson scale Tropical depression (≤38 mph, ≤62 km/h) Tropical storm (39–73 mph, 63–118 km/h) Category 1 (74–95 mph, 119–153 km/h) Category 2 (96–110 mph, 154–177 km/h) Category 3 (111–129 mph, 178–208 km/h) Category 4 (130–156 mph, 209–251 km/h) Category 5 (≥157 mph, ≥252 km/h) Unknown Storm type Tropical cyclone Subtropical cyclone Extratropical cyclone, remnant low, tropical disturbance, or monsoon depression

In late June 2013, an area of disturbed weather persisted in the southern Philippine Sea, accompanied by a broad area of low pressure. Moving northwestward under the influence of a subtropical ridge, the system organized in favorable conditions of low wind shear the following day. At 1200 UTC on June 27, the disturbance became sufficiently organized to be classified as a tropical depression by the Japan Meteorological Agency (JMA); at the time the depression had winds of 55 km/h (35 mph) and a minimum barometric pressure of 1006 mbar (hPa; 29.71 inHg). (Note: The Japan Meteorological Agency is the official Regional Specialized Meteorological Center for the western Pacific Ocean.) Three hours later, the Philippine Atmospheric, Geophysical and Astronomical Services Administration (PAGASA) upgraded the system to tropical depression status, designating it with the local name Gorio; however, the agency estimated weaker winds in the storm.

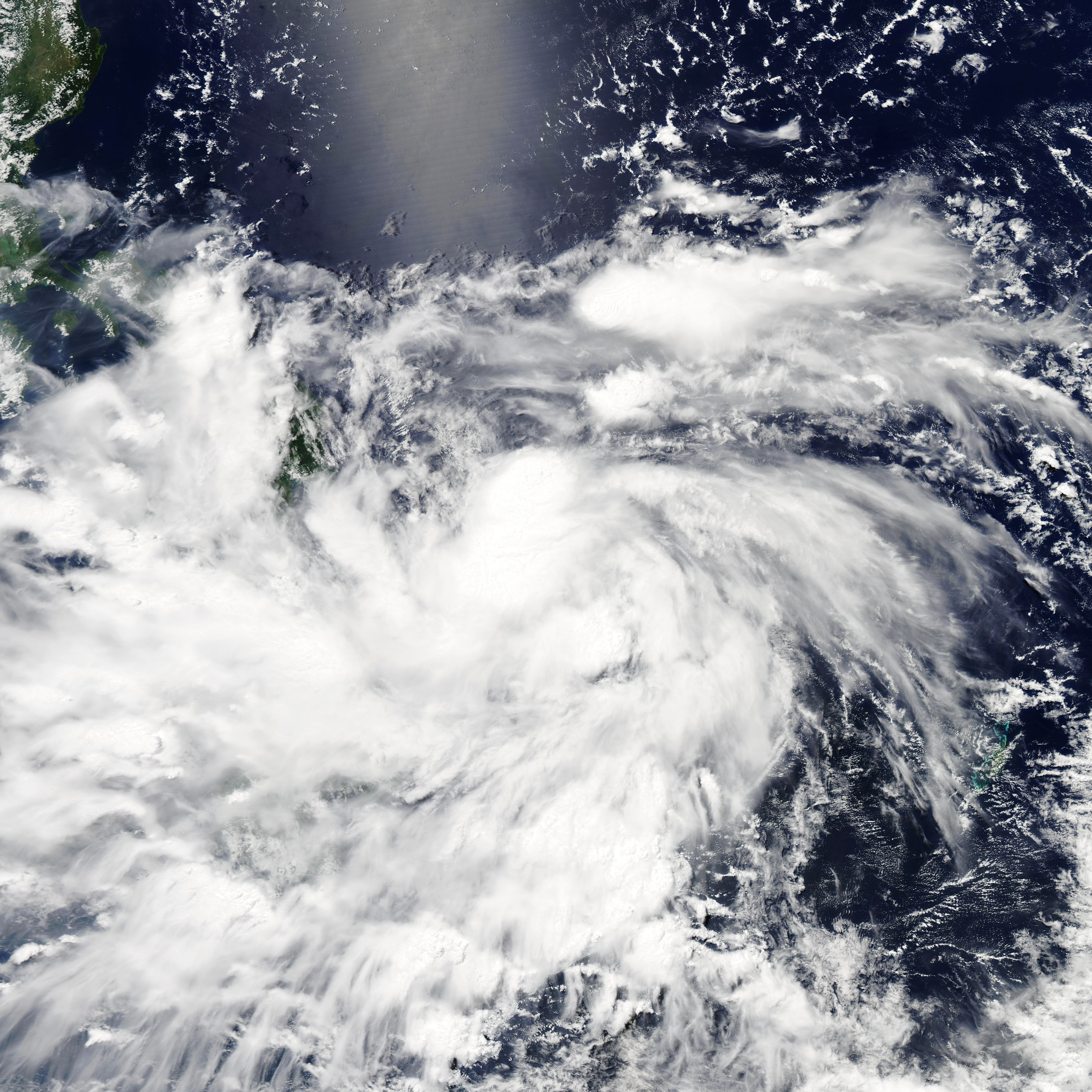
Tropical Storm Rumbia approaching the Philippines on June 28

Throughout June 28, the low-level circulation center of the depression consolidated and its rainbands intensified and organized around the center. At 0300 UTC that day, the Joint Typhoon Warning Center (JTWC) also upgraded the system to tropical depression 06W. (Note: The Joint Typhoon Warning Center is a joint United States Navy – United States Air Force task force that issues tropical cyclone warnings for the western Pacific Ocean and other regions.) Nine hours later, the depression strengthened sufficiently to be upgraded to tropical storm intensity by JMA, giving the storm the international designation Rumbia; the PAGASA followed suit three hours later. As deep convection became more centralized, a decaying tropical upper tropospheric trough to the north of Rumbia suppressed polar outflow from the tropical storm, thus hampering further intensification. The subtropical ridge to the northeast continued to force Rumbia towards the northwest, and by 0300 UTC on June 29, Rumbia made landfall near Hernani, Eastern Samar as a tropical storm with winds of 65 km/h (40 mph) and a minimum barometric pressure estimated at 1000 mbar (hPa; 29.53 inHg). Rumbia later passed over Samar Island, and made additional landfalls on other islands in the Philippines before emerging into the South China Sea by 0300 UTC the following day; upon emergence, the tropical storm maintained the same intensity as it had at its initial landfall.

Once in the South China Sea on June 30, Rumbia steadily organized, with the storm's banding features becoming more well defined around the center. However, moderate wind shear still displaced much of the convection to the southwest. Throughout the day, microwave imagery began to detect an eye developing within Rumbia, indicating strengthening. At 2100 UTC that day, the tropical storm moved out of the PAGASA's area of responsibility, and thus the agency's last warning on the system was issued at that time. A period of rapid intensification later ensued, and at 0600 UTC on July 1, the JMA upgraded Rumbia to severe tropical storm intensity; consequently, the tropical cyclone reached its peak intensity with winds of 95 mph (60 km/h) and a minimum barometric pressure of 985 mbar (hPa; 29.09 inHg). Three hours later, the JTWC reclassified Rumbia as a typhoon, indicating a wind speed increase of 45 km/h (30 mph) in 24 hours.

== Preparations ==
=== Philippines ===
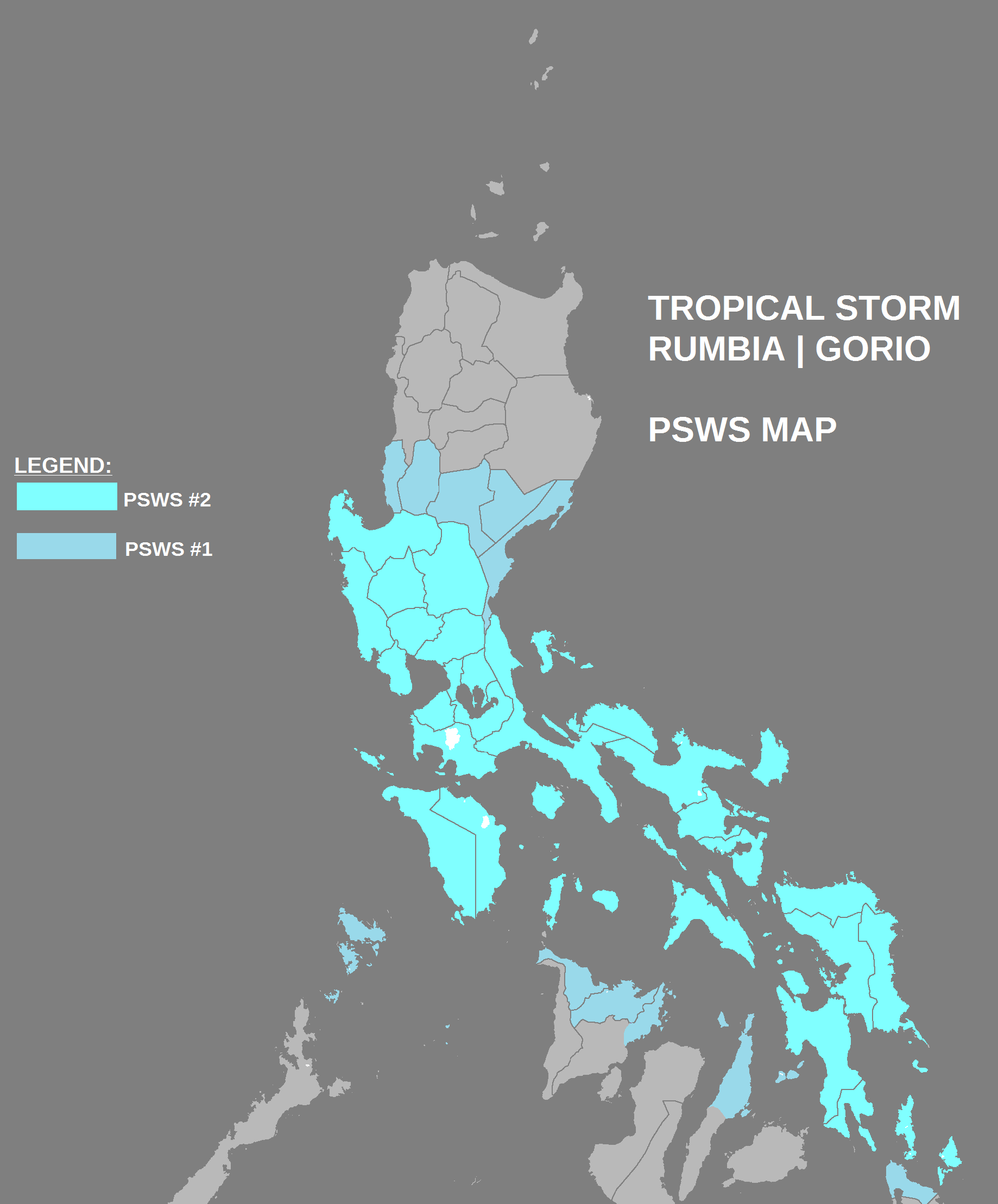
Highest Storm Warning in the Philippines during the passage of Rumbia

Upon the system's formation, the PAGASA issued a public storm warning signal No. 1 at 2100 UTC on June 27 for the entirety of Samar, as well as the Dinagat Islands and Siargao Island. At 0900 UTC the following day, the warnings in Visayas were extended to include the provinces of Leyte and Biliran. The warnings were also expanded to include numerous provinces in Luzon. Later that day, all preexisting warnings in Visayas and Mindanao were upgraded to signal No. 2 classification, while other areas of Visayas were issued new signal No. 1 warnings. In Luzon, the provinces of Catanduanes, Albay, Sorsogon, Masbate, Burias Island, and Ticao Island were upgraded to No. 2 warnings, while the provinces of Quezon, Polillo Island, Camarines Norte, Camarines Sur, Marinduque, and Romblon remained under or were issued No. 1 warnings. As Rumbia approached the coast, No. 1 warnings were expanded to include additional provinces, while No. 2 warnings generally covered the same areas up until landfall. All warnings in Mindanao were discontinued by 0300 UTC on June 29, by which time Rumbia made landfall.

In Manila, the Metropolitan Manila Development Authority's (MMDA) Monsoon Task Force deployed 200 personnel to 11 station in the local metropolitan area to monitor flooding and traffic conditions, as well as assist in potential rescue situations. The authority also requested the dismantling of all outdoor advertisements and billboards. Army rescue trucks were also on standby in Guadalupe, Makati. The Philippine government allocated ₱6.9 million in relief funds to deal with the effects of Rumbia. The Department of Social Welfare and Development in Eastern Visayas activated rapid response teams and prepared 1,040 family food packs for potential delivery in disaster areas. The department also readied ₱263,920 in standby food funds and ₱1.7 million in food items, as well as ₱270,350 in standby non-food funds. The civil defense office in the province also called for the preemptive evacuation of citizens in potentially affected areas. Local disaster management units in Caraga were activated, with 2,000 family food packs readied and a standby fund totaling ₱300,440. In total, the cost of prepositioned food packs, standby funds, food items, and other relief materials in Eastern Visayas and Caraga amounted to ₱6.9 million.

=== Highest Public Storm Warning Signal ===
PSWS#	LUZON	VISAYAS	MINDANAO
PSWS #2	Catanduanes, Camarines Norte, Camarines Sur, Albay, Sorsogon, Masbate incl. Ticao and Burias Island, Lubang Island, Occidental Mindoro, Oriental Mindoro, Marinduque, Romblon, Quezon incl. Polillo Island, Batangas, Laguna, Cavite, Rizal, Bataan, Bulacan, Tarlac, Pampanga, Pangasinan, Metro Manila	Eastern Samar, Northern Samar, Samar, Biliran, Leyte, Southern Leyte	Dinagat Island, Siargao Island
PSWS #1	La Union, Benguet, Nueva Vizcaya, Quirino, Aurora, Calamian Group of Islands	Aklan, Capiz, Northeastern Iloilo, Northern Cebu incl. Bantayan and Camotes Island	Surigao del Norte

=== Hong Kong ===
As Rumbia entered within 800 km of Hong Kong, the Hong Kong Observatory issued the Standby Signal, No. 1 at 21:10 HKT (13:10 UTC) on June 30 to warn the general public of the presence of the cyclone. Over the next fourteen hours, Rumbia edged closer to Hong Kong, entering within 400 km of the region at 12:00 HKT (local time) on July 1. Winds became considerably strong on Lantau Island and on high ground, reaching sustained speeds of up to 60 km/h and gusts up to 90 km/h, prompting the Observatory to issue the Strong Wind Signal, No. 3. Rumbia continued to track northwest and stayed roughly 400 km away from Hong Kong for around thirteen hours. As Rumbia began to move away and strong winds were no longer prevalent, the Observatory issued the Standby Signal, No. 1 at 5:10 HKT on July 2. All signals were cancelled at 9:40 HKT when Rumbia no longer posed a threat.

== Impact ==
=== Philippines ===
Due to the heavy rainfall from Rumbia in Tacloban, local officials were forced to cancel the scheduled Day of Festivals Parade. Elsewhere in Leyte, the rains began to cause widespread flooding on June 29, which also contributed to the cancellation of the event. In Central Visayas, Southern Luzon, Bicol, Northern Mindanao, and Eastern Visayas, the storm displaced 10,604 passengers due to the stoppage of transportation services as a result of Rumbia. Two major roadways in Eastern Visayas were blocked by soil erosion and flooding left behind by the heavy rainfall. In Bicol, the Philippine Coast Guard suspended maritime operations, resulting in the displacement of at least 2,949 passengers. A minor landslide rendered a main road impassable, but cleanup crews subsequently removed the debris. In Northern and Eastern Samar, downed wires resulted in temporary and isolated power outages across the two provinces.

=== China ===
Across Zhanjiang, 1.4 million people were affected by the storm. A total of 1,146 homes and 183,650 hectares of crops were destroyed, with total economic losses amounting to ¥1.17 billion (US$191 million). In Guangxi, preliminary assessments revealed that 13.16 million people were affected by the storm. A total of 112 buildings collapsed while 276,828 sustained varying degrees of damage. Additionally, 2,160 hectares of crops were damaged. Total economic losses from the storm reached ¥7.68 million (US$1.25 million).

== See also ==
- Typhoon Rammasun
- Typhoon Son-Tinh (2012)
- Tropical Storm Higos (2008)
- Typhoon Mujigae
- Tropical Storm Choi-wan (2021)
- Tropical Storm Nalgae (2022)
- Tropical Storm Fengshen (2025)
