= List of storms named Pepito =

The name Pepito has been used for two tropical cyclones in the Philippine Area of Responsibility in the West Pacific Ocean. It replaced the name Pablo on the naming lists:

- Typhoon Saudel (2020) (T2017, 19W, Pepito) – a typhoon that affected the Philippines, Vietnam and Southern China.
- Typhoon Man-yi (2024) (T2424, 25W, Pepito) – a Category 5 super typhoon that made landfall in Aurora and Catanduanes.

The name Pepito was retired following the 2024 season and replaced with Puwok, which refers to the local typhoon deity in Ifugao.

== See also ==
- Storm Claudia (2025) – a European windstorm that was named Pepe by the Free University of Berlin.
