= PepitoTheCat =

Automated Twitter account

- Website type: Twitter account
- Available in: English
- Owner: Clément Storck
- Website: twitter.com/pepitothecat
- Launched: July 2011; 15 years ago
- Current status: Online

@PepitoTheCat is an X account operated by a French software engineer named Clément Storck. It sends an automatic post whenever Storck's cat, Pépito, uses his cat door to enter or exit the house, alongside a photograph and a timestamp. This is achieved with a device and surveillance camera which monitors the cat door. Since Storck created the account in 2011, it has amassed over 1.1 million followers.

== History ==
Pépito is a black cat owned by Clément Storck, a software engineer who lives in Paris. He was born in 2007 to the pet of one of Storck's friends, and was gifted to Storck when he was four months old.

Storck created a website called PushingBox which can be used to send notifications triggered by real-life events, such as the opening of a door or the ringing of a doorbell. In July 2011, he used the same software to create an automated Twitter account called @PepitoTheCat. Storck used a device to detect when Pépito has used the cat door and positioned a surveillance camera on it. The account sends a message reading "Pépito is out" if he is detected leaving or "Pépito is back home" when he comes back, along with a photo and timestamp. After 2012, a different cat door was used and the account switched from French to English. When Storck moved to Paris in 2015, Pépito remained at his parents' house. By November 2016, the account had 18 thousand followers. In the rare occasions that the account is not regularly updated, his followers have posted about their distress online.

On 2 February 2023, Twitter CEO Elon Musk announced that it would no longer support free access to the application programming interface (API) starting 9 February, which third-party developers and automated accounts rely on. However, Musk considered giving innocuous automated accounts with verification access after Storck tweeted in protest of the decision. The account's followers increased from over 211 thousand followers around this time to 565 thousand by July 2023, to 952 thousand by November 2023, and to 1.1 million by September 2026.
