= Pepe (disambiguation) =

Pepe is a masculine given name and a surname.

Pepe or PEPE may also refer to:

- Anna Pepe (born 2003), known professionally as Anna, Italian rapper and singer-songwriter
- Pepe (1960 film), a film directed by George Sidney
- Pepe (2024 Dominican film), a Dominican Republic drama film
- Pepe (2024 Indian film), an Indian Kannada-language action drama film
- "Pepe" (song), featured in the 1960 film
- Pepe (textiles), secondhand clothes popular in Haiti
- Pepe Jeans, a European denim and casual wear company
- Frank Pepe Pizzeria Napoletana, a restaurant in New Haven, Connecticut, US
- Pepe's Piri Piri, a British-based fast food chain
- Parallel Element Processing Ensemble, a computer system
- Pepe the Frog, internet meme
- Maltenglish, also known as Pepè, the phenomenon of code-switching between the Maltese and English languages
