= Gabriele Pepe =

Italian republican insurgent

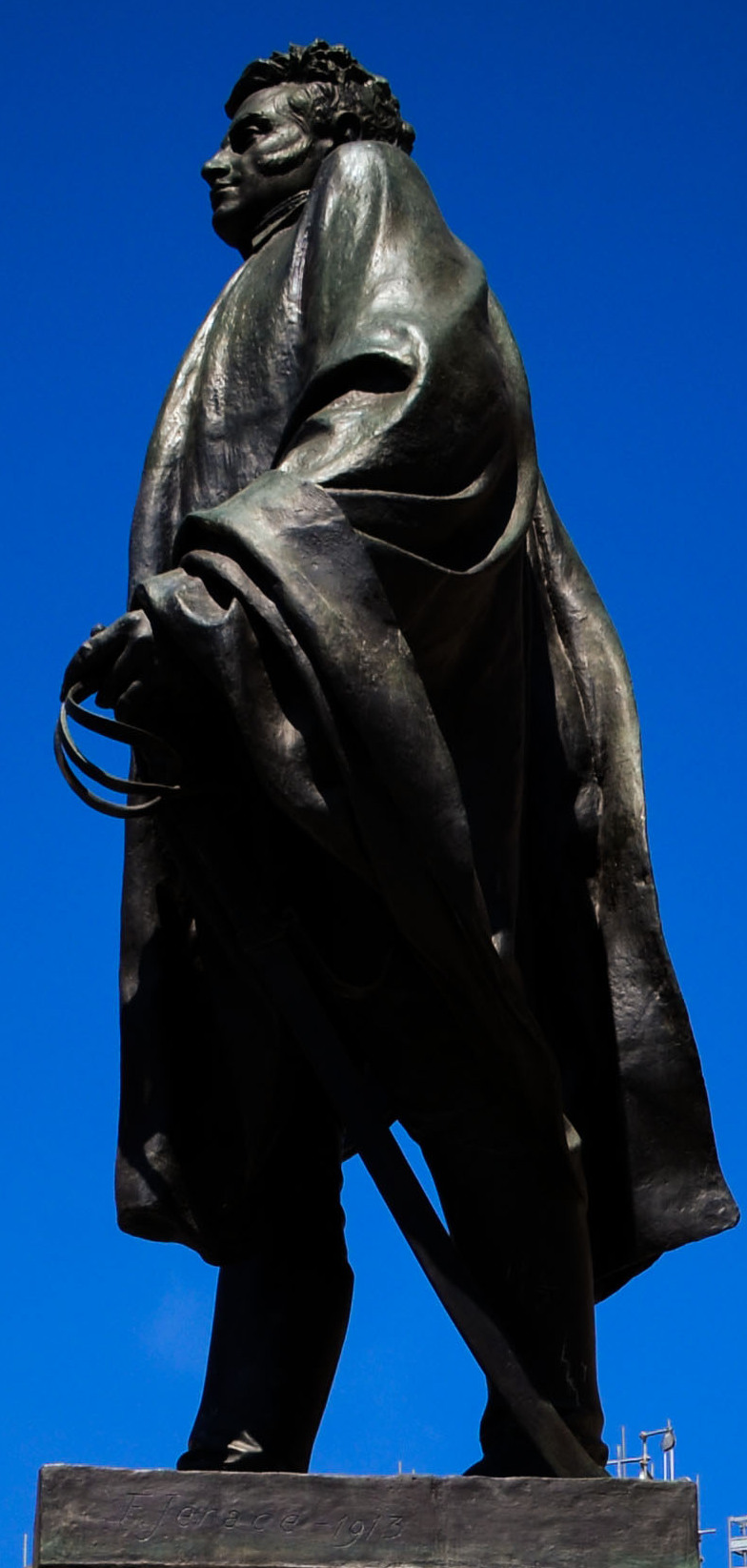

Gabriele Pepe (7 December 1779 – 26 July 1849) was an Italian republican insurgent, active in many campaigns against royalists fighting with or alongside the Bourbon kings of Naples. He was a cousin of Guglielmo and Florestano Pepe.

Born in Civitacampomarano (now Molise), by the age of 20, he had fought in defence of the Neapolitan Republic in 1799. With the fall of the republic, he escaped severe punishment because he was perceived to be ill. He would return to Naples, this time fighting for the Napoleonic armies both under Joseph Bonaparte. He was wounded, and captured by royalist troops led by Cardinal Fabrizio Ruffo, and again banished to Marseille, France. He was soon fighting with Napoleon across the continent, from Spain to Northern Italy. Later he found himself a major in the army of Joachim Murat.

He took part in the Neapolitan Revolution of 1820, and was again sent to exile, this time to Florence. On February 19, 1826, he dueled with the poet Alphonse de Lamartine, who had compared Italians to "human dust" in his poem "Le Dernier Chant du pélerinage d'Harold". He wounded with a sword the French poet in the right arm. In 1836, he returned to Naples where, although aged, he participated in the 1848 riots.

In the main piazza of Campobasso, a monument with his statue was erected.
