= Guglielmo Pepe =

Italian general (1783–1855)

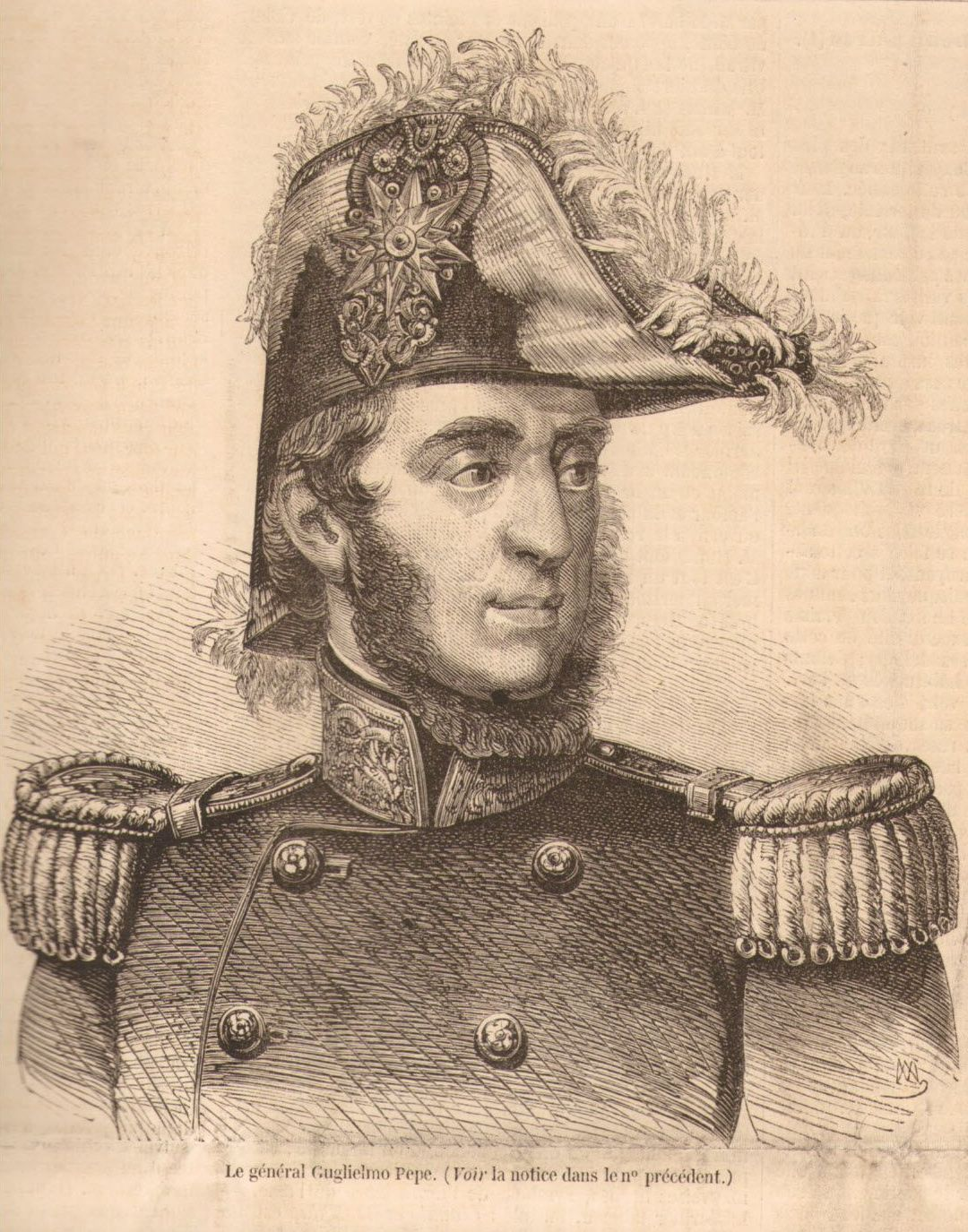
- Born: 13 February 1783; Squillace, Kingdom of Naples
- Died: 8 August 1855 (aged 72); Turin, Kingdom of Sardinia
- Military career
- Allegiance: Kingdom of Naples
- Service years: 1804–1848
- Rank: Brigadier General
- Conflicts: Napoleonic Wars; Peninsular War; Battle of Tolentino; Siege of Venice (1848)

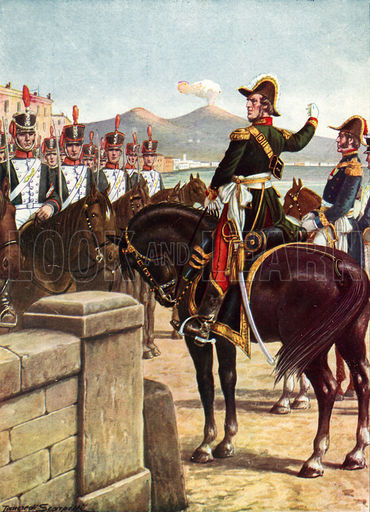
Guglielmo Pepe on the Ponte della Maddalena in Naples

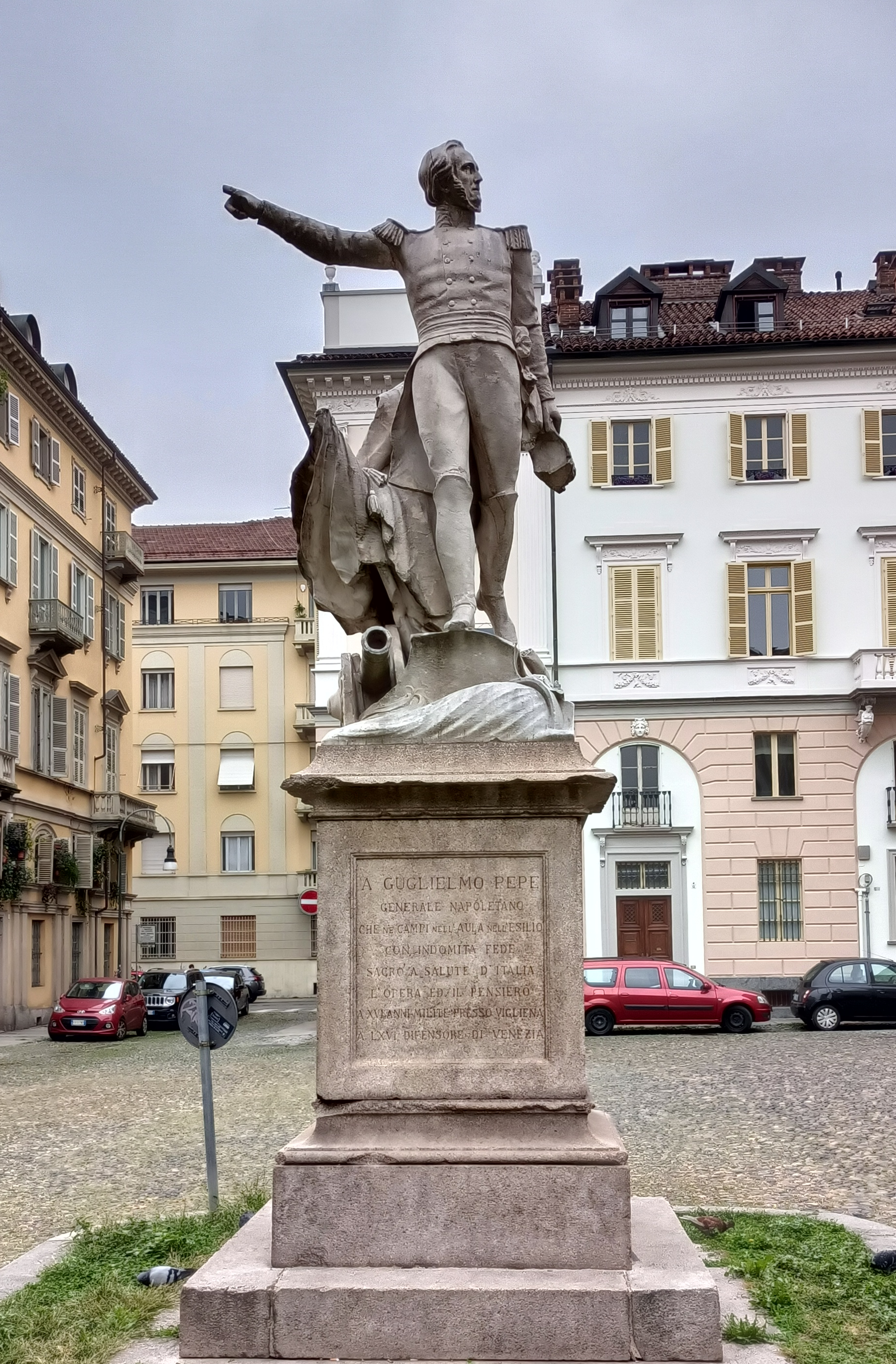
Statue of Guglielmo Pepe in Maria Teresa square, Turin

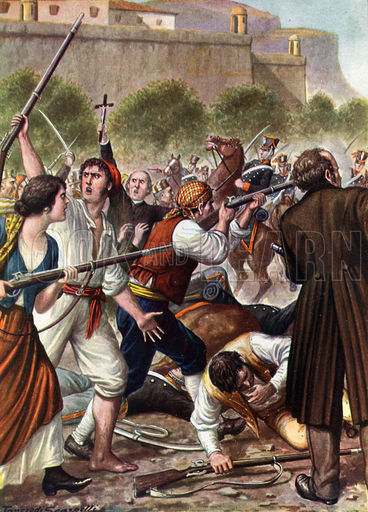
Palermo insurrection of 1820

Guglielmo Pepe (13 February 1783 – 8 August 1855) was an Italian general and patriot. He was brother to Florestano Pepe and cousin to Gabriele Pepe. He was married to Mary Ann Coventry, a Scottish woman who was the widow of John Borthwick Gilchrist, linguist and surgeon to the East India Company.

== Biography ==
Pepe was born at Squillace in Calabria.

He entered the army at an early age, but in 1799 he took part in the Neapolitan Republic, inspired by the French Revolution. While fighting against the Bourbon troops, which were led by Cardinal Ruffo, he was captured and exiled to France. He entered Napoleon's army and served with distinction in several campaigns, including those in the Neapolitan kingdom: first under Joseph Bonaparte, and later under Joachim Murat.

After commanding a Neapolitan brigade in the Peninsular campaign, Pepe returned to Italy in 1813, with the rank of general, to help reorganize the Neapolitan army. When news of the fall of Napoleon (1814) reached Italy, Pepe and several other generals tried, without success, to force Murat to grant a constitution as the only means of saving the kingdom from foreign invasion and the return of the Bourbons.

On Napoleon's escape from Elba (1815) Murat, after some hesitation, placed himself on the emperor's side and waged war against the Austrians, with Pepe on his staff. After several engagements the Neapolitans were forced to retire after the Battle of Tolentino (in which Pepe participated), and eventually agreed to the Treaty of Casalanza, according to which Murat was to abandon the kingdom; but the Neapolitan officers retained their rank under Ferdinand IV, who now regained the throne of Naples.

While engaged in suppressing brigandage in the Capitanata, Pepe organized the carbonari into a national militia, intending to use them for political purposes. He had hoped that the king would grant a constitution; but when that hope failed he contemplated seizing Ferdinand, the emperor of Austria, and Metternich, who were expected at Avellino, in order to compel them to install a liberal constitution in Italy (1819). The scheme broke down through an accident, but in the following year a military rising broke out, the mutineers cheering for the king and the constitution. Pepe himself was sent against them; but while he was deciding on which course to follow, Ferdinand promised a constitution (July 1820). A revolt in Sicily having been repressed, Pepe was appointed inspector-general of the army.

Meanwhile, the king, who had no intention of respecting the constitution, went to the Congress of Laibach to confer with the sovereigns of the holy alliance assembled there, leaving his son as regent. The king obtained the loan of an Austrian army with which to restore absolute power, while the regent dallied with the Liberals. Pepe, who in parliament had spoken in favour of deposing the king, now took command of the army and marched against the Austrians. He attacked them at Rieti (March 1821), but his raw levies were repulsed.

The army was gradually disbanded. Pepe then spent several years in England, France and other countries, publishing a number of books and pamphlets of a political character and keeping up his connection with the Carbonari. When the 1848 revolution and war broke out all over Italy, Pepe returned to Naples, where a constitution had again been proclaimed. He was given command of the Neapolitan army, which was to cooperate with Piedmont against the Austrians. However, when he reached Bologna, the king, who had already changed his mind, recalled him and his troops. Pepe, after hesitating between his desire to fight for Italy and his oath to the king, resigned his commission in the Neapolitan service and crossed the Po with 2,000 volunteers to take part in the campaign. After a good deal of fighting in Venetia, he joined Manin in the siege of Venice and took command of the defending army. When the city was forced by hunger to surrender to the Austrians, Pepe and Manin were among those excluded from the amnesty.

He again went into exile and died in Turin in 1855.

== Works ==
- Relazione delle circostanze relative agli avvenimenti politici e militari in Napoli nel 1820 e 1821 [...] (1822)
- Memorie (1847)
- L'Italie politique et ses rapports avec la France et l'Angleterre (1848)
- Casi d'Italia negli anni 1847, 48 e 49: continuazione delle memorie del generale Guglielmo Pepe (1851)

== See also ==
- Copanello
