= Florestano Pepe =

Italian general (1778–1851)

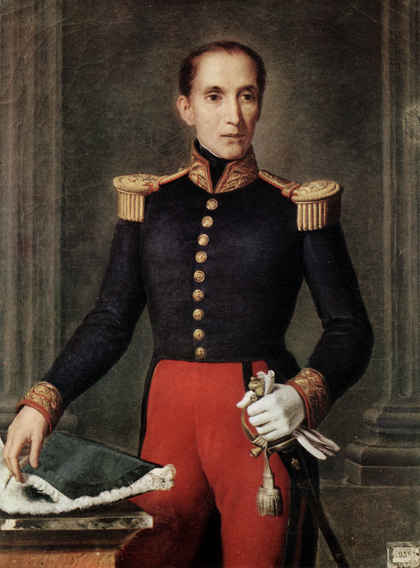
Portrait of Pepe

Lieutenant-General Florestano Pepe (March 4, 1778 – April 3, 1851) was an Italian army officer. He was brother to the more famous general Guglielmo Pepe and cousin to Gabriele Pepe.

Pepe was born in Squillace (Calabria) and entered the Two Sicilies army at young age. In 1799 he was amongst the defenders of the Neapolitan Republic. Defeated by the Bourbon troops under Cardinal Ruffo, he was captured and exiled to France.

He fought in numerous battles of the Napoleonic Wars under Joseph Bonaparte and Joachim Murat. He was chief of staff of the Neapolitan Division of Marshal Suchet's army in the Peninsular War (1809), and took part in the Russian Campaign of 1812. He was also a protagonist of the Neapolitan Revolution of 1820; wounded, he retired to private life.

Florestano Pepe died in Naples in 1851.
