= Pepe Soho =

Mexican photographer (1971–2025)

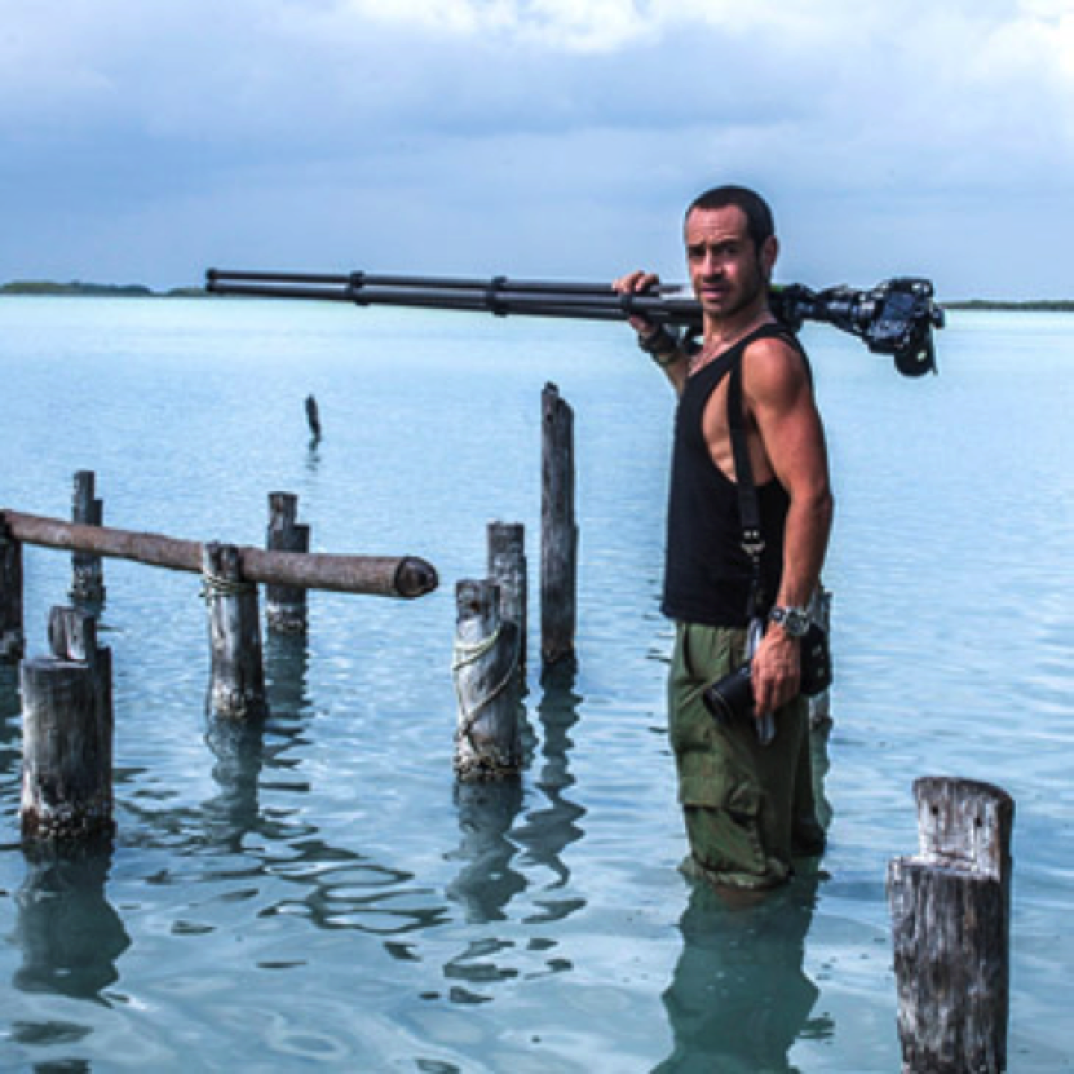
- Soho in 2016
- Born: José Askenazi Cohen; 20 October 1971; Mexico City, Mexico
- Died: 10 October 2025 (aged 53); Mexico City, Mexico
- Known for: Photography

Pepe Soho (born José Askenazi Cohen; 20 October 1971 – 10 October 2025) was a Mexican landscape and nature photographer.

Prior to becoming a photographer Soho had careers as a designer, musician, and businessman. At the age of 40 he began to dedicate himself exclusively to photography. In 2017 he won first place in the World Photographic Cup in the Nature (Landscape and Wildlife) category for his image “Believe.” Forbes magazine named him as one of the most creative Mexicans of 2017, and he is widely acknowledged as one of Mexico's most important contemporary photographers.

== Early life and musical career ==
Pepe Soho was born in Mexico City on 20 October 1971. His father, Eduardo Askenazi, was a businessman in the textile industry. His mother, Paz Cohen, was a sculptor and painter. Soho expressed an early interest in art, photography, and music. He began taking lessons and playing the drums at the age of 12.

By the end of the 1980s, before Soho was yet 20 years old, he was playing drums in a prestigious nightclub in Mexico City called Sugar. He shared the stage with important Mexican rock bands and singers like Sabo Romo, and Leonardo de Lozanne. He was also part of the tour Tremendo of the band Magneto.

In 1990, he moved to Los Angeles, California, to continue studying percussion at The Musicians Institute. There he joined the rock group Ash Gallery with fellow Mexican Atto Attie and played on and off with this band for almost three years in famous venues such as the Whisky a Go Go and The Roxy. He simultaneously joined the band of the Bull Dog Café bar in Mexico, where he played for two years collaborating with artists such as Álex Lora, Alejandra Guzmán and Erik Rubín.

== Fashion design and entertainment ==
In 1993, Soho opened a used record store in the Condesa neighborhood of Mexico City where he also sold a limited selection of designer clothes. Soon thereafter he began designing and selling his own clothing, beginning with printed T-shirts of rock bands. A year later he opened his first clothing store called SOHO, the name by which he became commonly known. By the year 2000, the iconic brand had expanded to twenty stores in Mexico City and other states. SOHO runways enlisted the participation of Mexican TV personalities such as Sebastián Rulli, Cynthia Klitbo, Galilea Montijo, Leonardo García, Francisco de la O and Braulio Luna. The fashion shows were staged in popular venues and attracted record crowds.

In 2007 Soho designed and opened a popular nightclub in the city: "LOVE", in the neighborhood of Polanco.

== Photography ==
Soho credited a near-death experience with revitalizing his childhood interest in photography and a renewed appreciation of the natural world. In 2011, Soho traveled to India to take part in a 3-month meditation retreat. Shortly into the trip, however, he suffered a brutal accident while riding a horse that broke both his knees. The accident forced him to return to Mexico in a wheelchair. Soho underwent numerous surgeries and endured a long recovery. The medical treatments weakened his immune system and he was eventually diagnosed with Systemic Candidiasis, which caused extreme weight loss and pain. Soho battled with severe depression until he began to regain mobility and his overall health in 2013. On brief walks in the Bosque de Chapultepec he started taking photographs, primarily as a means of distraction. Nine months later he applied to a photography school in Mexico City and went on to study at the International Center of Photography (ICP), in New York City. Upon concluding his studies, he undertook various photography expeditions that would take him to more than 50 countries around the world, starting in Antarctica. His most recent focus was on the landscape of his native Mexico.

In 2014 Soho opened a gallery in the neighborhood of Polanco to showcase his work. Within a few years he opened an additional space in Mexico City and three others in San Miguel de Allende, Guanajuato; and Playa del Carmen, and Tulúm in Quintana Roo.

== Other photography-related work ==
In 2018 Soho was guest artist and ambassador for the World Wildlife Fund's Pequeñas Navegantes contest, which promotes the preservation of the olive ridley turtle, the smallest of the marine turtles.

Soho participated in projects outside of his own work including NBC's Samsung Galaxy S8 campaign as well as the Festival Internacional de Fotografía FotoMéxico 2017, organized by the Centro de la Imagen.

In 2017, he was a jury member at the photographic contest Reto Foto México organized by the magazine México Desconocido and Canon.

Upon request by the National Tourism Department, he participated in tourist campaigns such as Yo soy mexicano.

== Death ==
Soho died from cardiac arrest in Mexico City on 10 October 2025, at the age of 53.

== Awards and recognition ==
In 2018 he was listed in Forbes Mexico as one of Mexico's most creative people, an honor that recognizes individuals of significant influence and momentum. In the same year, One Hundred Artists You Can't Miss of Mexico and the National Tourism Guide named Soho as one of the country's best artists, praising his craftsmanship and the global attention he has earned as an outstanding Mexican artist.

In 2017 Soho's image "Believe," shot in Chile, won first place at the World Photographic Cup in the Nature (Landscape and Wildlife) category. Photographers from twenty-six countries on four continents participated in this category. In his acceptance speech, Soho said, "Photography restored my confidence and my life. After being immersed in the emptiness of depression, capturing images through the lens of my camera was my only motivation. I found in this art form a way of expressing my love for life and the admiration I have for nature ... I am very proud to have been honored with this award, but even more to represent my country and through my work show the world how wonderful Mexico is."

In 2016 the Mexican Photographic Committee invited Soho to participate in the Photographic World Cup, which was held that year in Portugal. His work "Zen," shot in Mozambique, won fourth place in the Nature (Landscape and Wildlife) category.

== Exhibitions ==
- 2018: Vida. la Galería Abierta de las Rejas de Chapultepec, Mexico City.
- 2017: Believe. José Luis Cuevas Museum, Mexico City.
