= Pepe (textiles) =

Secondhand clothes that are commonly worn by its population of Haiti

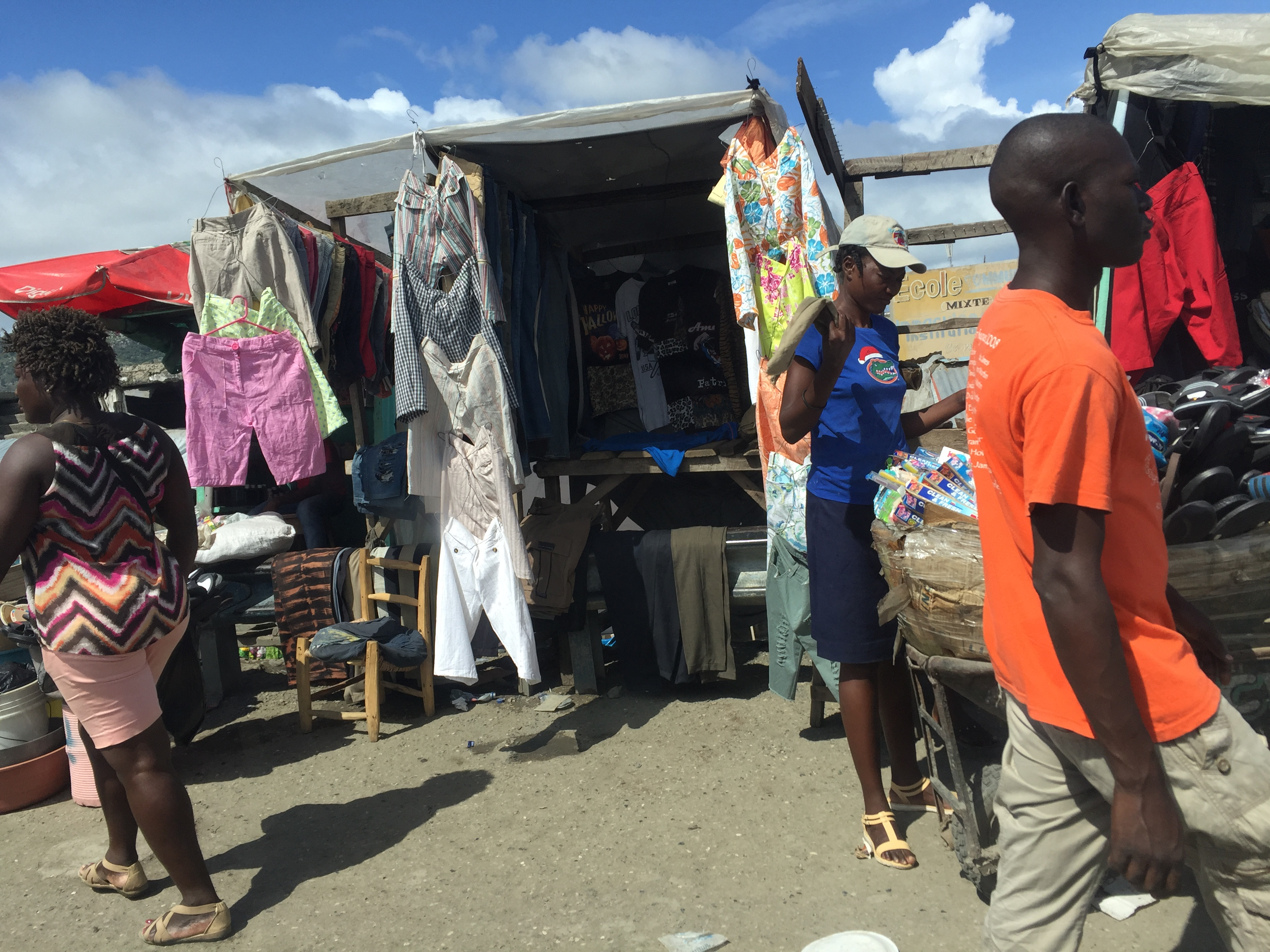
Pepe on display for sale

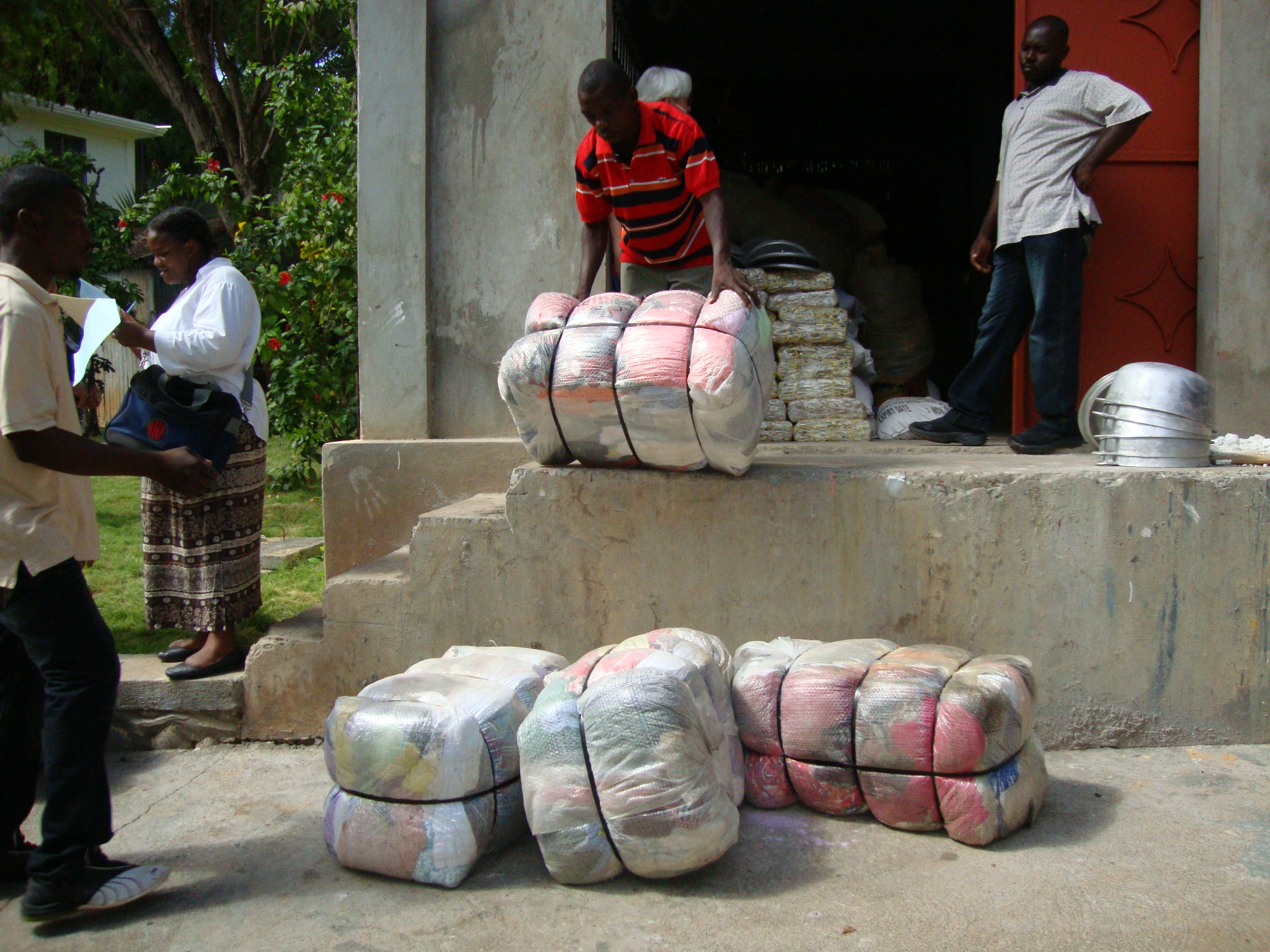
Pepe being unloaded in bales

Pepe may refer to secondhand clothes that are commonly worn by its population in Haiti. These clothes are usually sent from the United States. The Haitian textile industry has suffered due to the widespread popularity of pepe. There have even been discussions about banning the import of pepe. However, this is unlikely since the general population continues to wear pepe, which include many brand names that otherwise would be inaccessible.

== History ==
The import of pepe began in the 1960s, during the Kennedy administration, leading to the moniker "Kennedy clothes". Since the 1980s, hundreds of tons of pepe have been imported, usually packaged in huge bales. The clothes are so affordable, that a used boy's t-shirt from the United States could be sold for as little as thirteen cents in Haiti. Furthermore, at an affordable cost, local seamstresses make modifications to the clothing.

In recent years, Haiti has seen an increase in the amount of clothing coming from the United States as a result of fast fashion.

== See also ==
- Second-hand clothes
- Upcycling
