= List of Ethiopian and Eritrean dishes and foods =

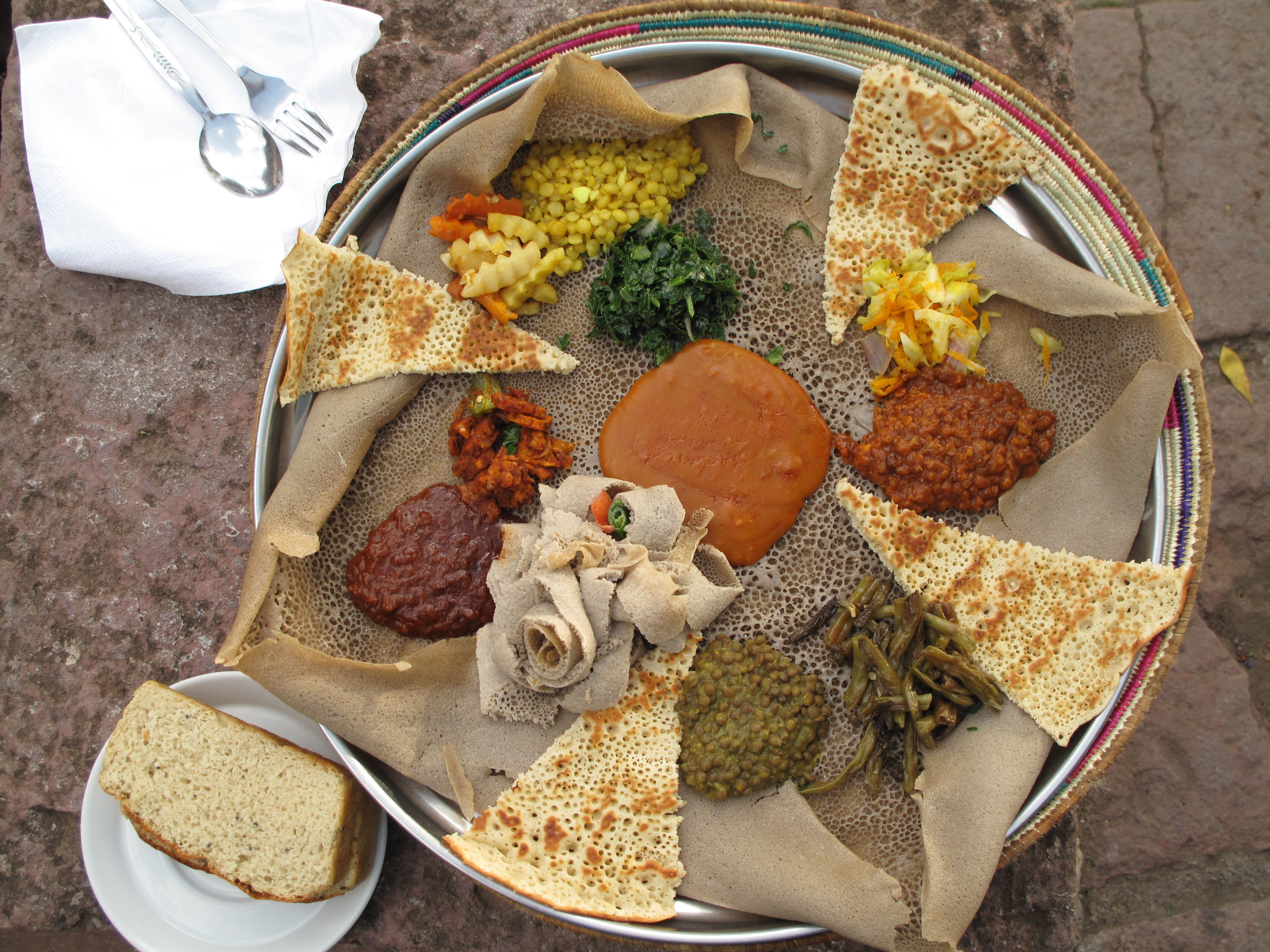
This meal, consisting of injera bread topped with several kinds of wat (stew), is typical of Ethiopian and Eritrean cuisine.

This is a list of Ethiopian and Eritrean dishes and foods. Ethiopian and Eritrean cuisines characteristically consists of vegetable and often very spicy meat dishes, usually in the form of wat (also w'et, wot or tsebhi), a thick stew, served atop injera, a large sourdough flatbread, which is about 50 centimeters (20 inches) in diameter and made out of fermented teff flour. Ethiopians and Eritreans eat exclusively with their right hands, using pieces of injera to pick up bites of entrées and side dishes. Utensils are rarely used with Ethiopian and Eritrean cuisine.

== Ethiopian and Eritrean dishes and foods ==
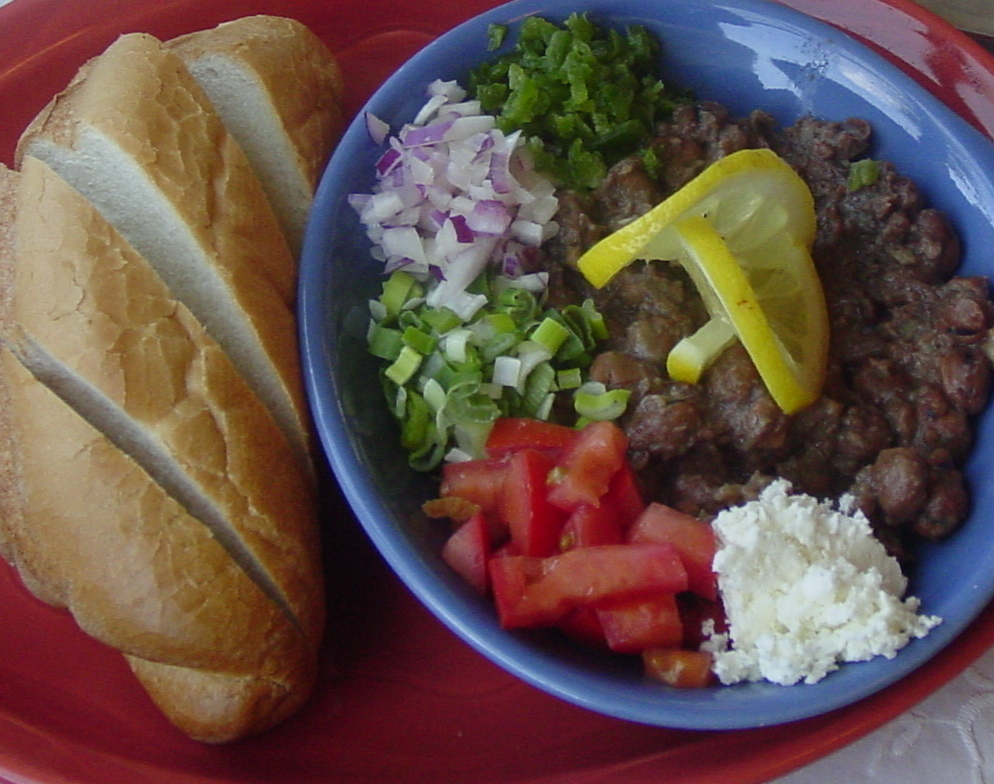
Shahan ful (pictured right, garnished with lemon)

=== Bread and pastry ===
- Dabo kolo (Amharic: ዳቦ ቆሎ; Oromo: Boqqolloo daabboo) – small pieces of fried dough, served as a snack
- Injera (Amharic: እንጀራ, romanized: ənǧära; Tigrinya: ጣይታ, romanized: ṭayta; Oromo: buddeena) – a spongy, slightly sour flatbread regularly served with other dishes.
- Himbasha (Tigrinya: ሕምባሻ) or ambasha (Amharic: አምባሻ) – wheel-shaped lightly sweet bread, often flavoured with raisins and cardamom
- Sāmbusā (Amharic: ሳምቡሳ) – Ethiopian-style samosa, fried pastry stuffed with spiced lentils

=== Breakfast ===
- Injera fir-fir – shredded injera mixed with niter kibbeh (clarified butter) and berbere, commonly served for breakfast
- Kitcha fir-fir (also known as chechebsa) – shredded kitcha mixed with niter kibbeh and berbere
- Enkulal fir-fir – scrambled eggs with jalapeño pepper, tomato, onion, niter kibbeh and berbere
- Suf fit-fit – shredded injera soaked in a liquid made from sunflower seeds
- Telba fit-fit – similar to suf fit-fit, but uses a liquid made from flax seeds instead
- Genfo (Amharic: ገንፎ, romanized: gänəfo) or ga’at (Tigrinya: ጋዓት, romanized: ga'atə) or marca (Oromo: marqaa) – a stiff porridge made from barley or wheat flour, sauced with a mixture of niter kibbeh and berbere, commonly served for breakfast

=== Dishes ===
- Ful medames – an Egyptian dish of cooked and mashed fava beans served with vegetable oil, cumin and optionally with chopped parsley, onion, garlic, and lemon juice, it is also a popular meal in Ethiopia, Eritrea and other countries.
- Gored gored (Amharic: ጎረድ ጎረድ; Oromo: gurguddaa) – a raw cubed beef dish
- Kitfo (Amharic: ክትፎ) – minced raw ground beef mixed with mitmita seasoning mix and niter kibbeh (clarified butter)
- Shahan ful – stewed fava beans served with chopped fresh vegetables and spices
- Shiro (Ge'ez: ሽሮ, romanized: šəro), also called shiro wat (Amharic: ሽሮ ወጥ, romanized: šəro wäṭ), or tsebhi shiro (Tigrinya: ጸብሒ ሽሮ, romanized: ṣäbhi šəro) – a stew with primary ingredients of powdered chickpeas or broad bean meal
- Tibs (Ge'ez: ጥብስ, romanized: ṭïbs) - cubes of beef in wat
- Tihlo (Tigrinya: ጥሕሎ) - a Tigrayan dish of barley dough balls served with meat stew and spiced with berbere
- Wat (Amharic: ወጥ, IPA: [wətʼ]) or ito (Oromo: ittoo) or tsebhi (Tigrinya: ጸብሒ) – stew that may be prepared with chicken, beef, lamb, a variety of vegetables, spice mixtures such as berbere, and niter kibbeh (clarified butter). Wat is traditionally eaten with injera.
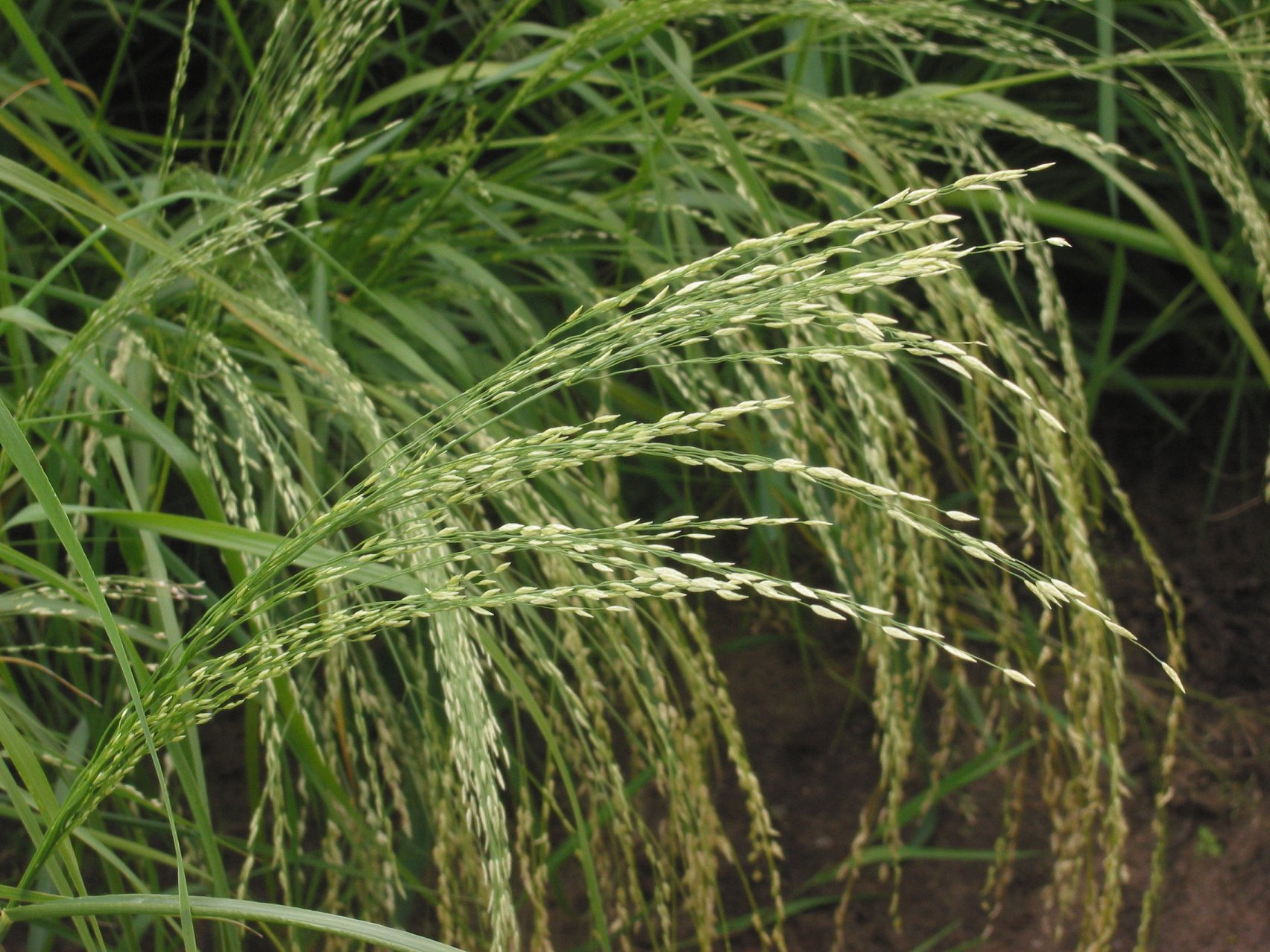
Eragrostis tef

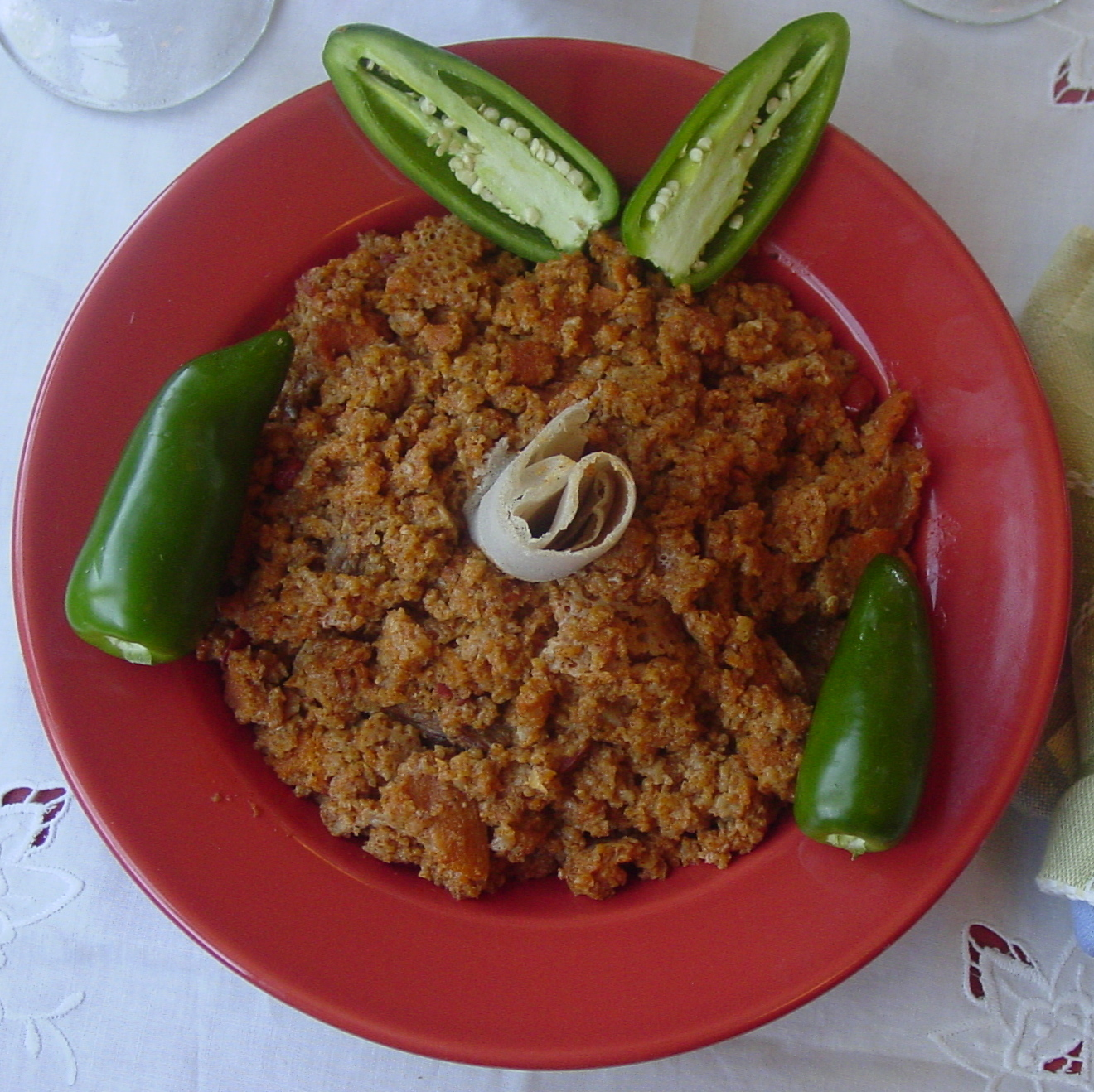
Fir-fir

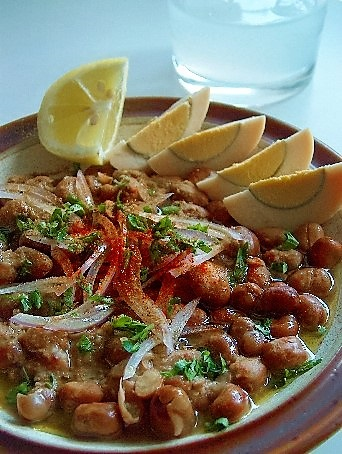
Ful medames served with sliced hard-boiled eggs

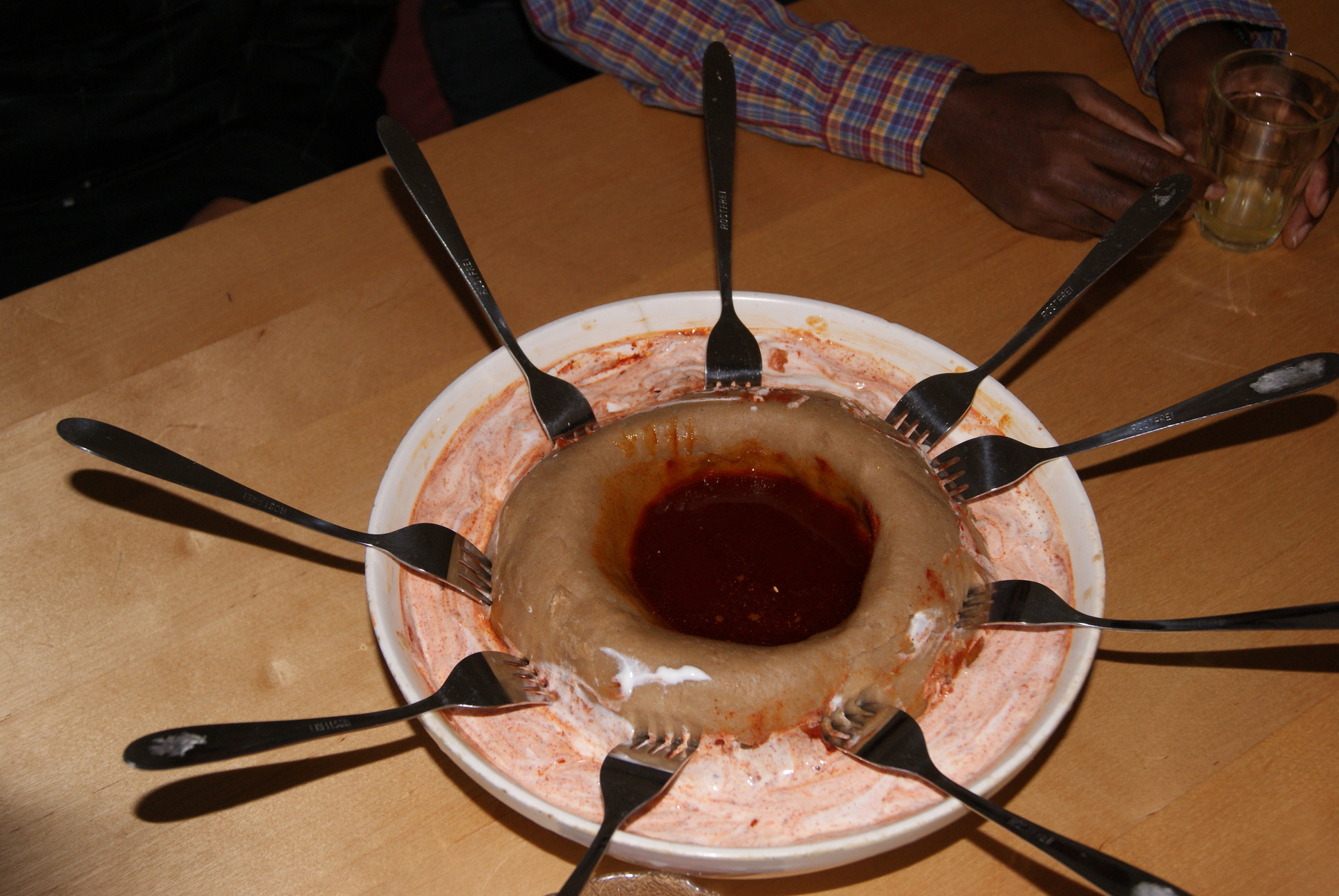
Ga'at

=== Crops ===
- Enset – a root crop, particularly important to the south of Ethiopia
- Teff – a grain widely cultivated and used in Eritrea and Ethiopia, where it is used to make injera or tayta. Teff accounts for about a quarter of total cereal production in Ethiopia.
- Gesho – leaves and stem used to flavour tej (mead) and tella (beer)
- Niger seed – the seeds of this herb are crushed to make an edible oil.

=== Sauces and spices ===
- Ethiopian cardamom – The spice known as korarima, Ethiopian cardamom, or false cardamom is obtained from the plant's seeds (usually dried), and is extensively used in Ethiopian and Eritrean cuisine. It is an ingredient in berbere, mitmita, awaze, and other spice mixtures, and is also used to flavor coffee.
- Berbere – usually includes chili peppers, garlic, ginger, basil, korarima, rue, ajwain or radhuni, nigella, and fenugreek.
- Mitmita – a powdered seasoning mix used in Ethiopian and Eritrean cuisine.
- Niter kibbeh – seasoned clarified butter used in Ethiopian and Eritrean cooking.
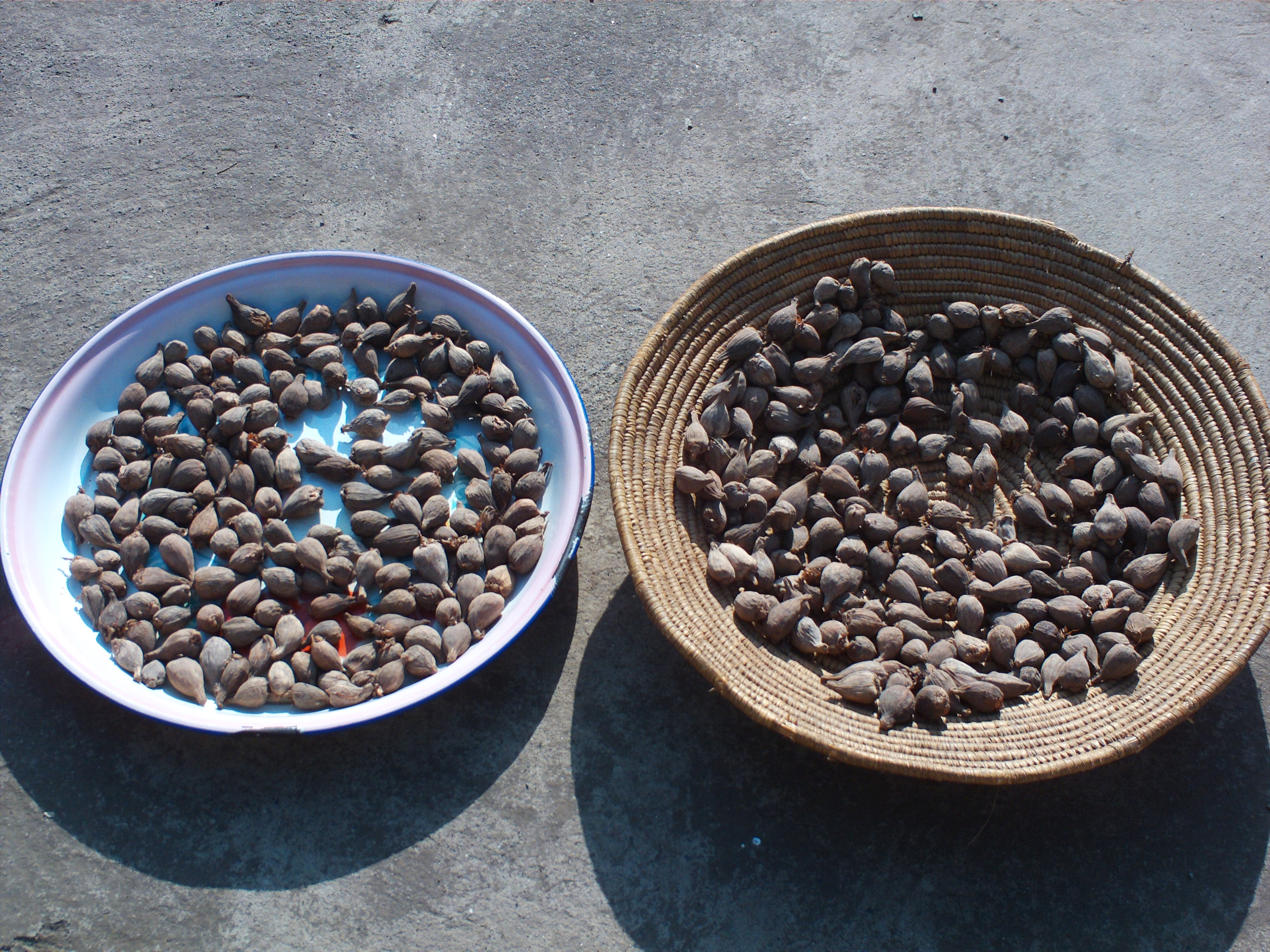
Dried korarima fruits from Aframomum corrorima, in preparation for making berbere

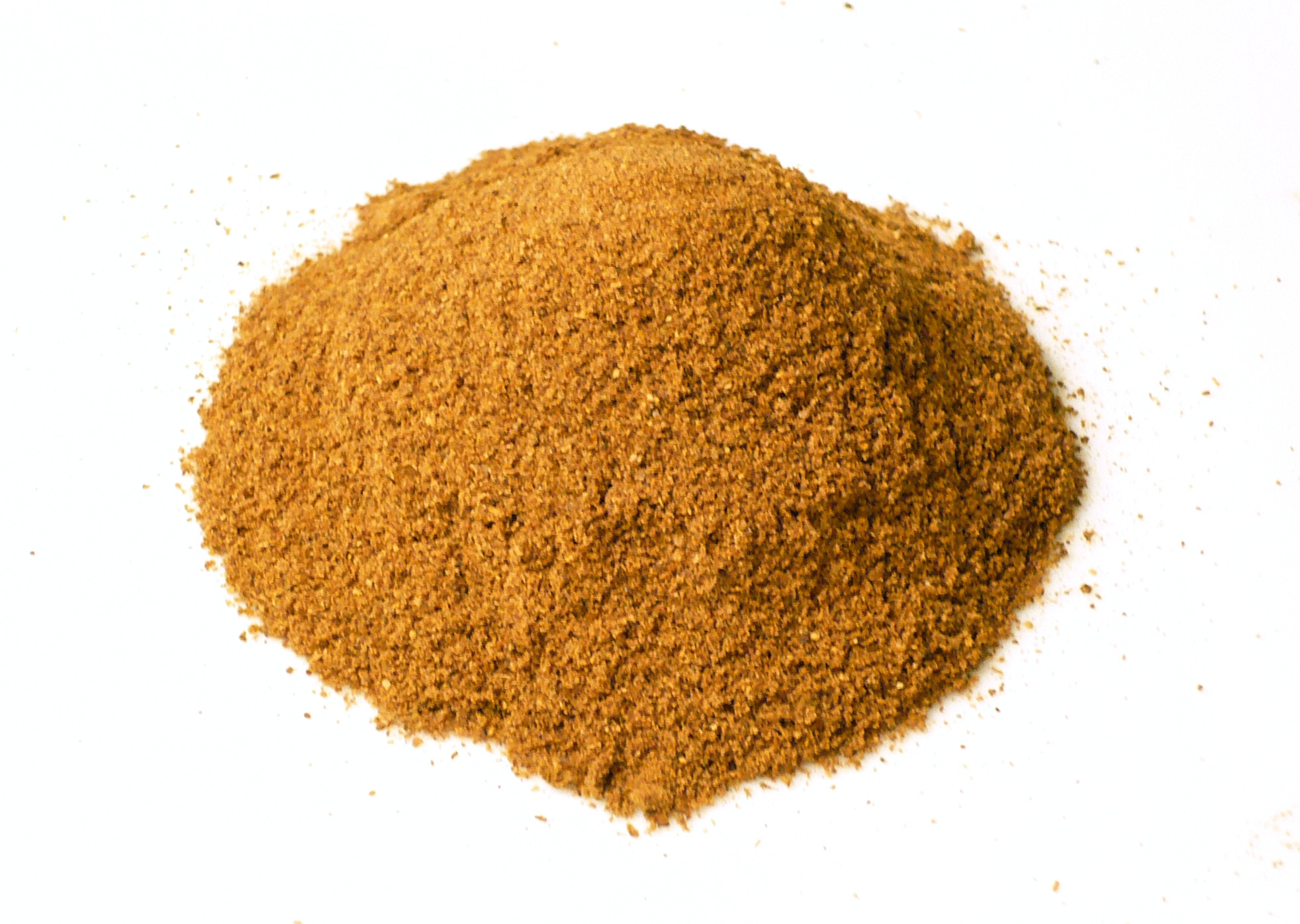
Berbere

=== Beverages ===
- Coffee - A brewed drink made from Ethiopian coffee beans and used in a jebena.
- Tej – A honey wine or mead that is brewed and consumed in Ethiopia and Eritrea.
- Tella – A traditional beer from Ethiopia and Eritrea that is brewed from various grains, typically teff and sorghum. It is called siwa in Tigray and Eritrea.
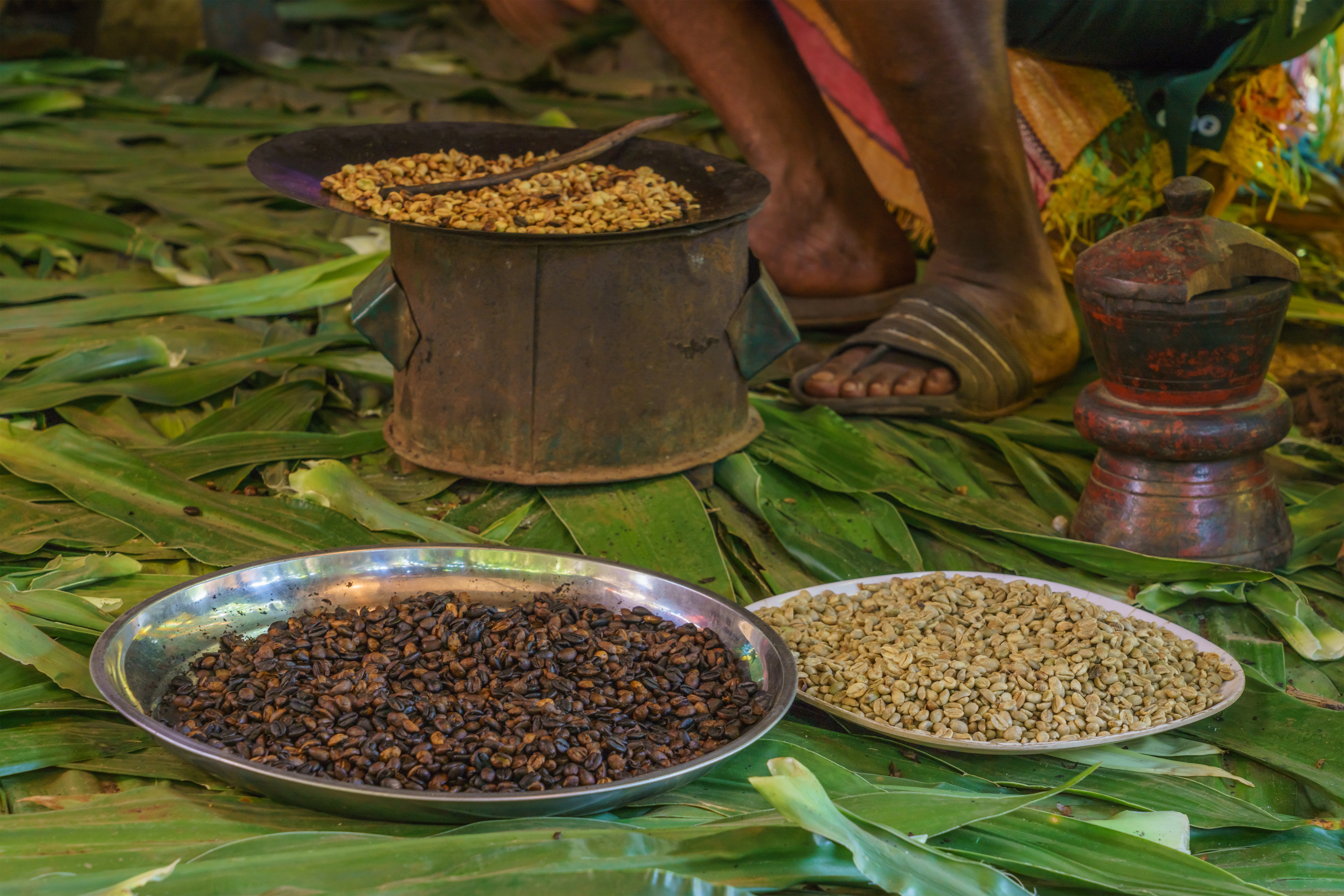
Coffee roasting in Amhara Region

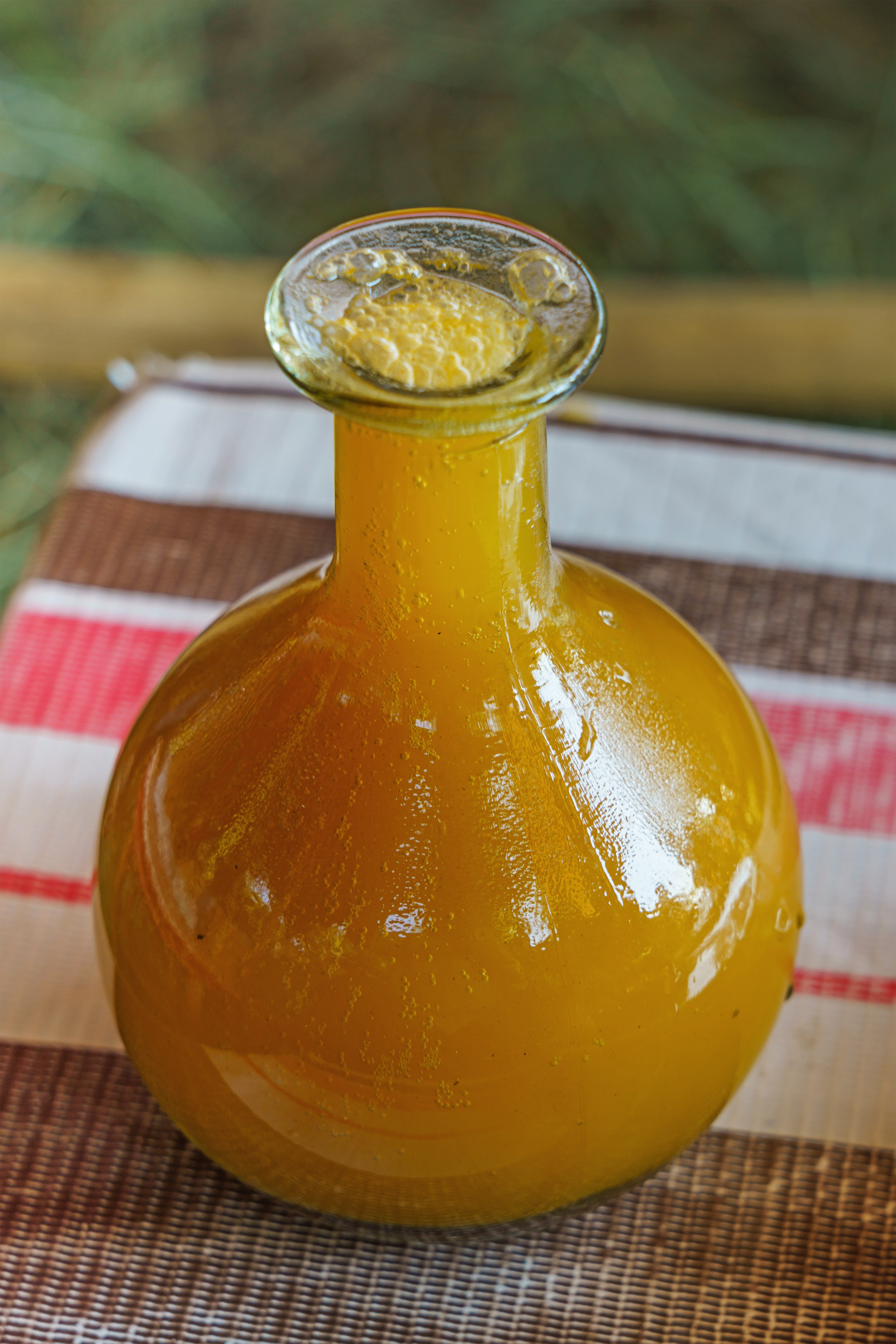
Ethiopian tej

== See also ==
- List of African dishes
- Outline of Ethiopia
- Outline of Eritrea
