= Fit-fit =

Ethiopian and Eritrean dish

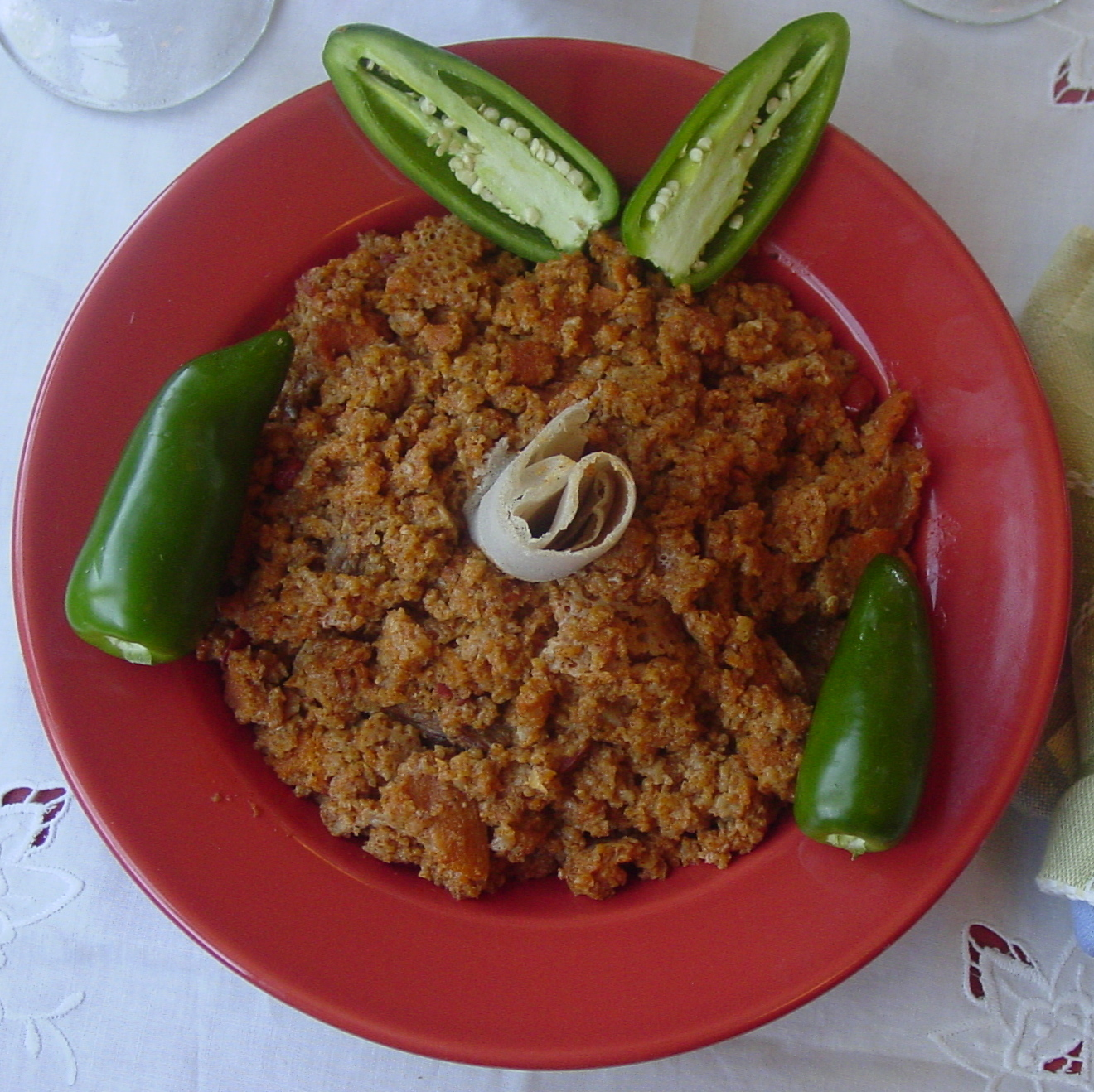
- Injera fit-fit served with jalapeño peppers
- Alternative names: Fir-fir
- Type: Bread
- Course: Breakfast
- Place of origin: Ethiopia and Eritrea
- Region or state: East Africa
- Main ingredients: Onion; Berbere; Vegetable oil; Niter kibbeh; Injera
- Variations: Injera fit-fit, kitcha fit-fit

Fit-fit or fir-fir (Ge'ez: ፍትፍት fətfət; ፍርፍር fərfər), (Oromo: chechebsaa), is an Ethiopian and Eritrean food typically served as breakfast. It is generally made with shredded Ethiopian flat bread (injera or kitcha), spiced clarified butter (niter kibbeh), and a hot spice blend called berbere. Fit-fit is served by preparing a sauce from the butter and spices, and blending it with the shredded flatbread. There are two main varieties of fit-fit depending on the type of flatbread being used: the sourdough injera and the unleavened kitcha.

== Injera fit-fit ==
Injera fit-fit (enjera fetfet; also taita fit-fit in Tigrinya) is a combination of shredded injera, berbere, onions, and clarified butter. Variations on this basic recipe are common in which the name of the additional item is commonly used as a prefix (e.g. injera with shiro is called shiro fit-fit).

In Eritrea, leftover meat sauces (zighni or tsebhi) are often added to injera fit-fit and served for breakfast with raw chili peppers and yoghurt on the side. Similarly, in Ethiopia, leftover wat is used as a main ingredient along with injera. It can also have cubed meat and boiled egg added.

Injera fit-fit can be eaten with a spoon when served in a bowl or eaten with the right hand when served atop of another piece of injera as is typical in Ethiopian or Eritrean cuisine.

== Kitcha fit-fit ==
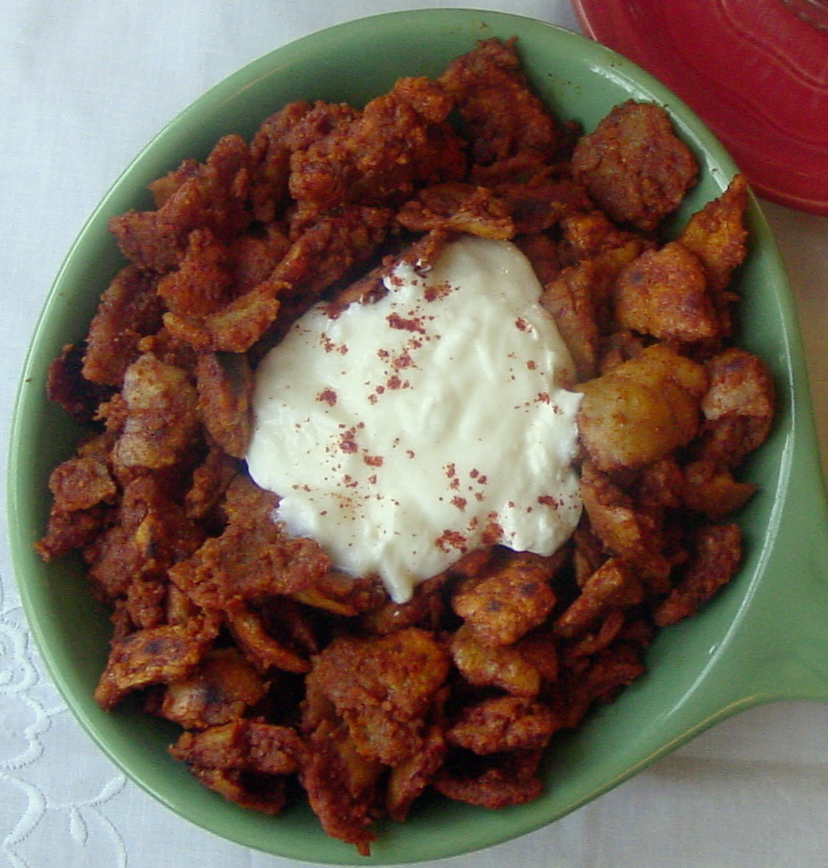
Kitcha fit-fit served with a scoop of fresh yogurt and topped with berbere (spice).

Kitcha fit-fit (variations in Ethiopia: kitta fer-fer, kita fir-fir; widely known by its Oromo name chechebsa) is a combination of shredded kitcha (Tigrinya) or kitta (Amharic), berbere, and clarified butter. Kitcha fit-fit is sometimes eaten with plain yogurt (urgo in Amharic and rug-o in Tigrinya). Unlike most Ethiopian foods, it is eaten with a utensil (usually a spoon).

== See also ==
- List of African dishes
- List of bread dishes
- List of Ethiopian dishes and foods
