= Genfo =

Porridge-like dish originated from Ethiopia and Eritrea

Genfo/Ga'at
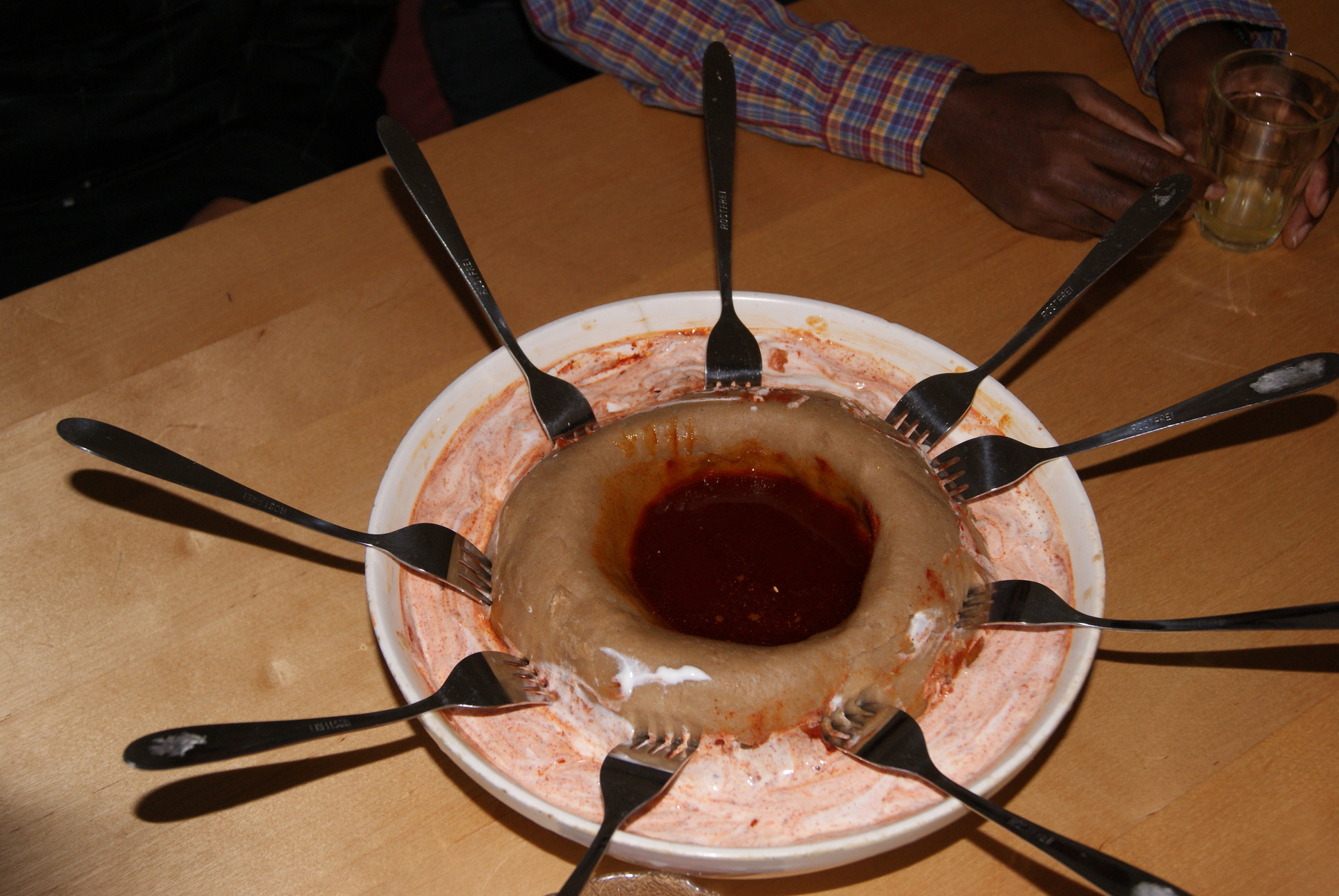
- Genfo with berbere sauce
- Type: Porridge (volcano)
- Course: Traditionally: breakfast; or for lunch and dinner
- Place of origin: Ethiopia, Eritrea
- Region or state: Amhara, Tigray, Oromia, Eritrea
- Serving temperature: Heated; in some regions, served with cool yogurt
- Main ingredients: Barley or wheat flour, water

Genfo (Amharic: ገንፎ, romanized: gänfo), also known as ga’at (Tigrinya: ጋዓት, gaʻat) or marca (Oromo: marqaa) is a stiff porridge-like dish that is normally formed into a round shape with a hole in the middle for the dipping sauce, a mixture of butter and red peppers, or pulses such as sunflower, seed, nut (Carthamus tinctorius) and flax (Linum usitatissimum).

Genfo shares many similarities with the Arab asida. Genfo is made with barley or wheat flour and to cook it the flour and water are combined and stirred continuously with a wooden spoon. Genfo is presented in a large mound with a hole in the center, filled with a mixture of niter kibbeh and berbere. The porridge may be eaten with the hands or with a utensil.

== See also ==
- Eritrean cuisine
- List of African dishes
- List of Ethiopian dishes and foods
- List of porridges
- Flummery, the original recipe of which was a strained, sour oatmeal jelly
