= Shiro (food) =

Powdered stew from Ethiopia and Eritrea

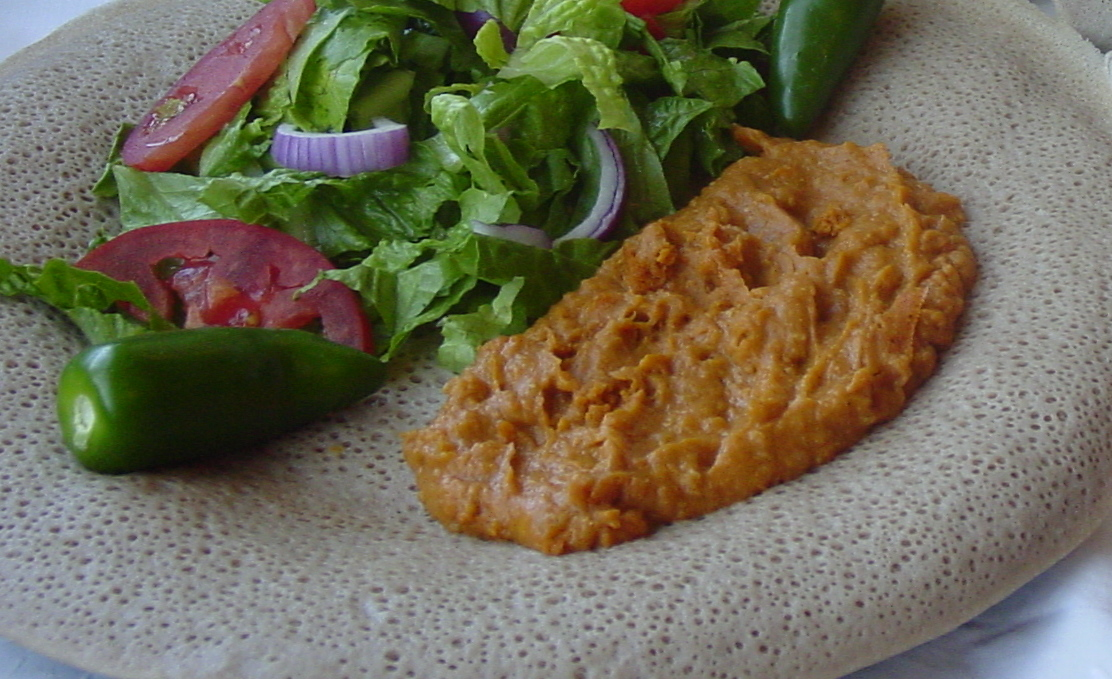
- Shiro served upon injera is a staple food of Eritrean and Ethiopian cuisine
- Type: Stew
- Course: Lunch; Dinner
- Place of origin: Ethiopia; Eritrea
- Region or state: East Africa
- Main ingredients: Chickpeas; Broad beans; Onions; Garlic
- Variations: Shiro fit-fit
- Food energy (per 100 g serving): 353 kcal (1,480 kJ)
Nutritional value
(per 100 g serving)
- Protein: 22.3 g
- Fat: 4.8 g
- Carbohydrate: 50 g

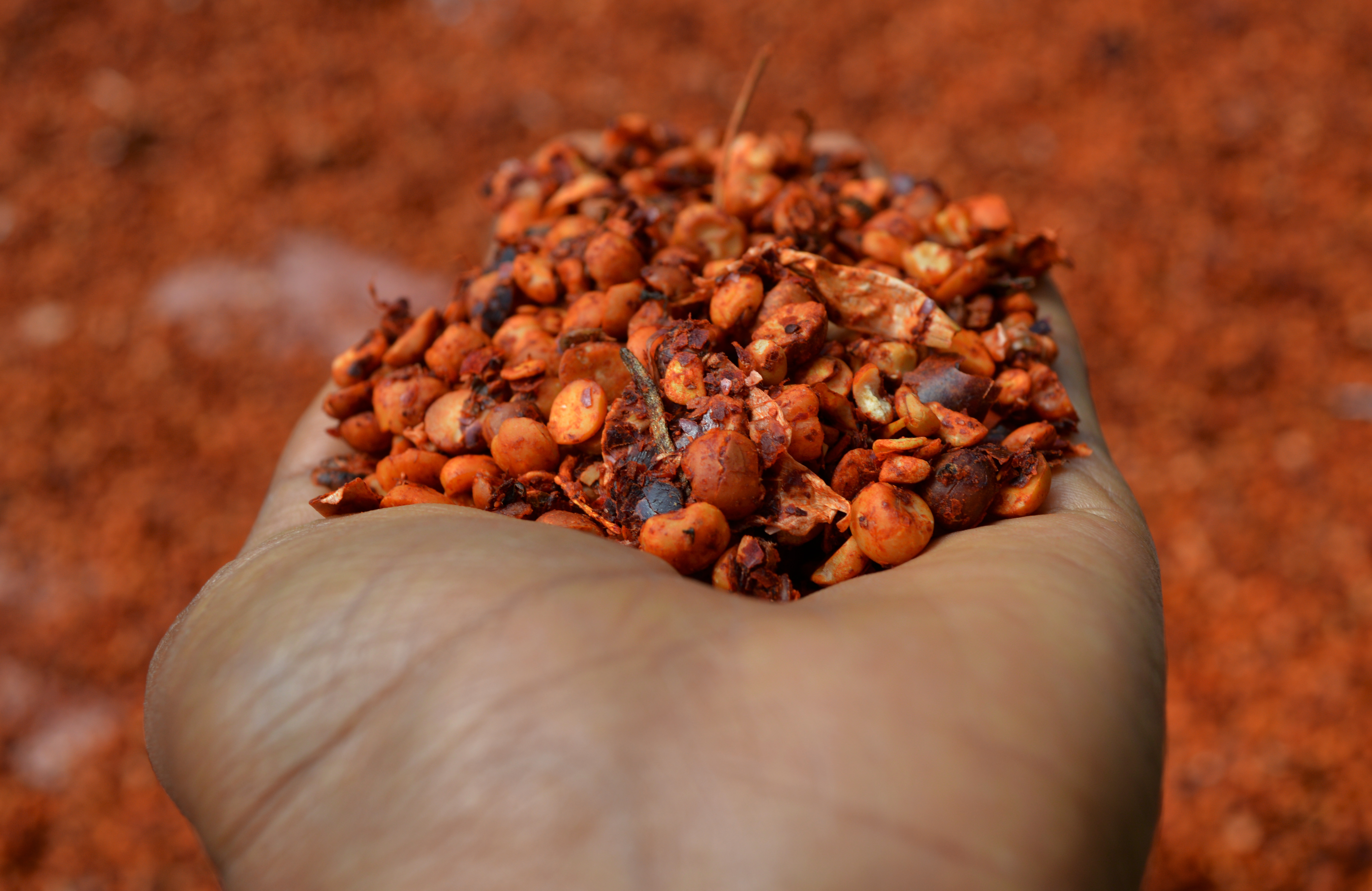
Chickpeas being prepared for grinding into flour for shiro tsebhi

Shiro (Ge'ez: ሽሮ, romanized: šəro), also called shiro wat (Amharic: ሽሮ ወጥ, romanized: šəro wäṭ), or tsebhi shiro (Tigrinya: ጸብሒ ሽሮ, romanized: ṣäbhi šəro), is a stew served for either lunch or dinner, originating from Northern Ethiopia and Southern Eritrea. An essential part of Eritrean and Ethiopian cuisine, its primary ingredient is powdered chickpeas or broad bean meal and often prepared with the addition of minced onions, garlic and, depending upon regional variation, ground ginger or chopped tomatoes and chili peppers. Shiro is served atop injera (leavened flatbread) or kitcha (unleavened flatbread). Tegabino shiro is a type of shiro made from heavily spiced legumes, chickpeas, field peas, or fava beans, oil (or butter), and water. It is brought bubbling to the table in a miniature clay pot or shallow aluminum pan. It is often consumed with dark or sergegna injera.

Shiro can be cooked and added to shredded injera or taita and eaten with a spoon; this version is called shiro fit-fit. Shiro is a vegan food, but there are non-vegan variations that use niter kibbeh (a spiced, clarified butter) or meat (in which case it is called bozena shiro).

Shiro is a favorite dish during special occasions, including Tsom (Lent), Ramadan and other fasting seasons.

== Preparation ==
The preparation of shiro wat first involves cooking the ground chickpeas or lentils. The roasted grains are mixed with water in a separate pot along with onions, garlic, and ginger, which are then sautéed and mixed with peppercorns to create a flavorful base.

== See also ==
- List of African dishes
- List of legume dishes
- List of stews

== Bibliography ==
- Ethiopian Millennium (electronic version, retrieved 19 June 2007)
