= Shahan ful =

Dish in Sudan, Somaila, Ethiopia and Horn of Africa

Ful
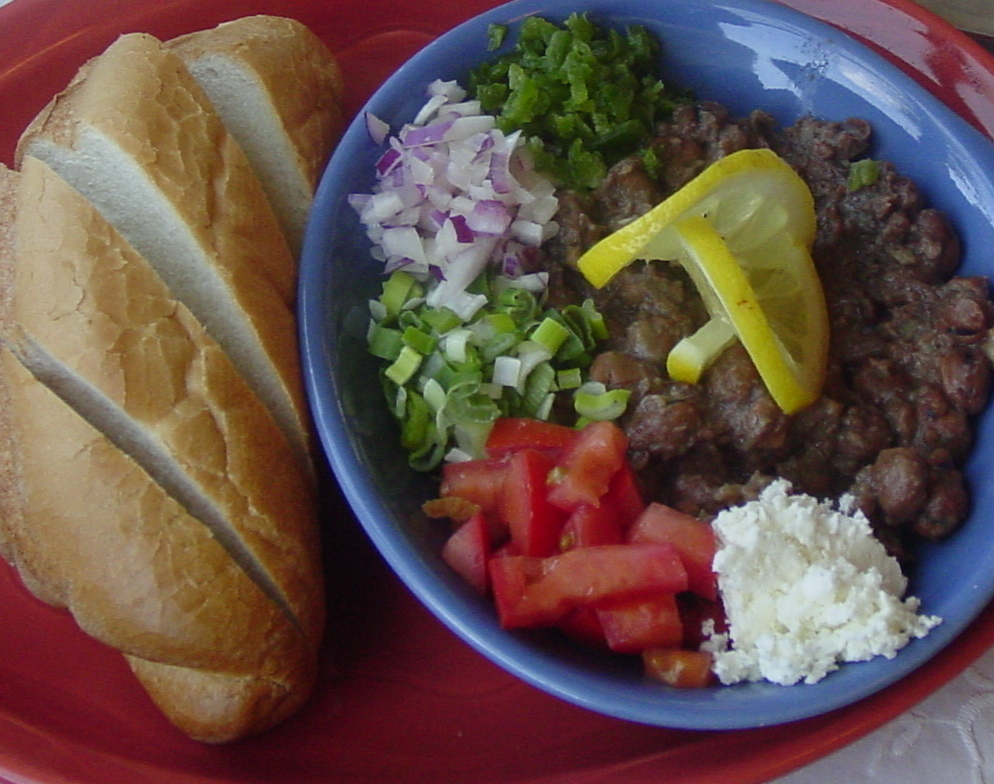
- Shahan ful presented alongside olive oil, berbere, various vegetables, and a roll of bread.
- Alternative names: Fūl
- Course: Breakfast, main course
- Region or state: Sudan, South Sudan, Somalia, Ethiopia and Eritrea
- Main ingredients: Fava beans, olive oil, cumin
- Variations: Lemon juice, onion, parsley, garlic, berbere, niter kibbeh

Shahan ful, simplified to ful, is a dish common in Sudan, South Sudan, Somalia, Ethiopia and other parts of the Horn of Africa, which is generally served for breakfast. Believed to originate from Sudan, it is made by slowly cooking fava beans in water. Once the beans have softened, they are crushed into a coarse paste. It is often served with chopped green onions, tomatoes, and hot green peppers, as well as yogurt, feta cheese, olive oil, tesmi, berbere, lemon juice, cumin, and chili pepper. It is typically eaten without the aid of utensils accompanied with a bread roll. It is popular during the Ramadan season and during the various Lents.

The dish is similar to ful medames, a popular dish of Egypt.

== See also ==
- List of African dishes
- List of legume dishes
