= Italian Eritrean cuisine =

Style of fusion cooking

Italian Eritrean cuisine is the mix of Eritrean dishes and spices with Italian dishes.

== Characteristics ==
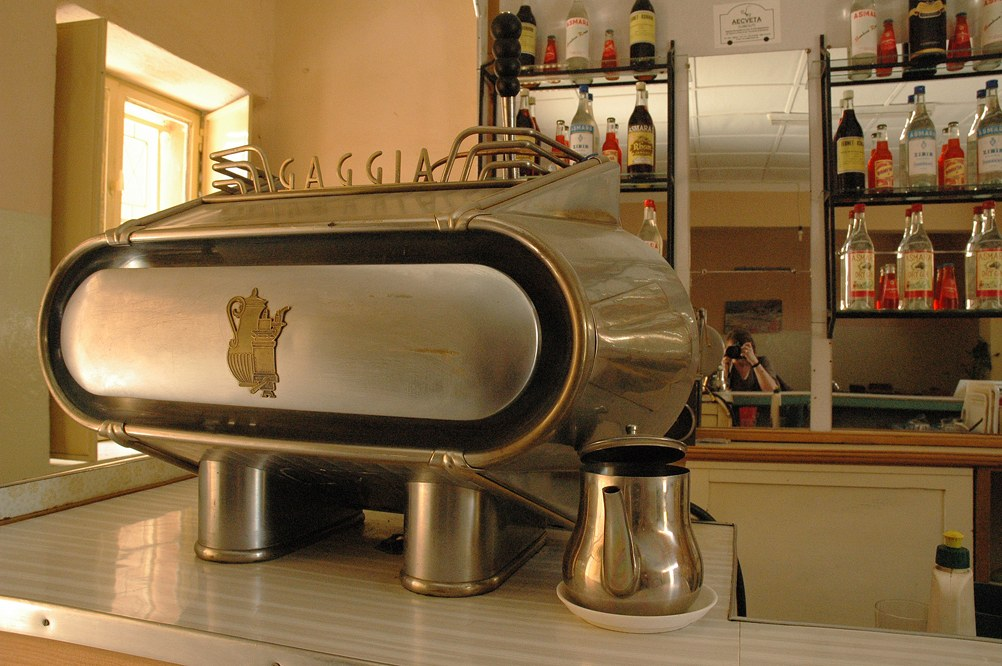
A vintage Gaggia espresso machine in a bar in Eritrea

This kind of cuisine is quite common with Eritreans in Eritrea, Italian Eritreans or simply Italians who live in Eritrea and vice versa. A common dish is "Pasta al Sugo e Berbere", which means "Pasta with tomato sauce and berbere" (spice), but there are many more like "lasagna" and "cotoletta alla milanese" (milano cutlet.) Italian influence is also apparent in Eritrea's beverages. Even though Eritrea has a long tradition of coffee drinking for centuries, Italian style coffee like espresso and cappuccino are extremely common in Eritrea and is almost served in practically every bar and coffee shop in capital Asmara.

The biggest brewery in the country is Asmara Brewery, built 1939 during Italian Eritrea under the name of Melotti. The brewery today produces a range of beverages. A popular Eritrean alcoholic spirit that is common during Eritrean festivities is Italian styled Sambuca, in Tigrinya it is translated to areki

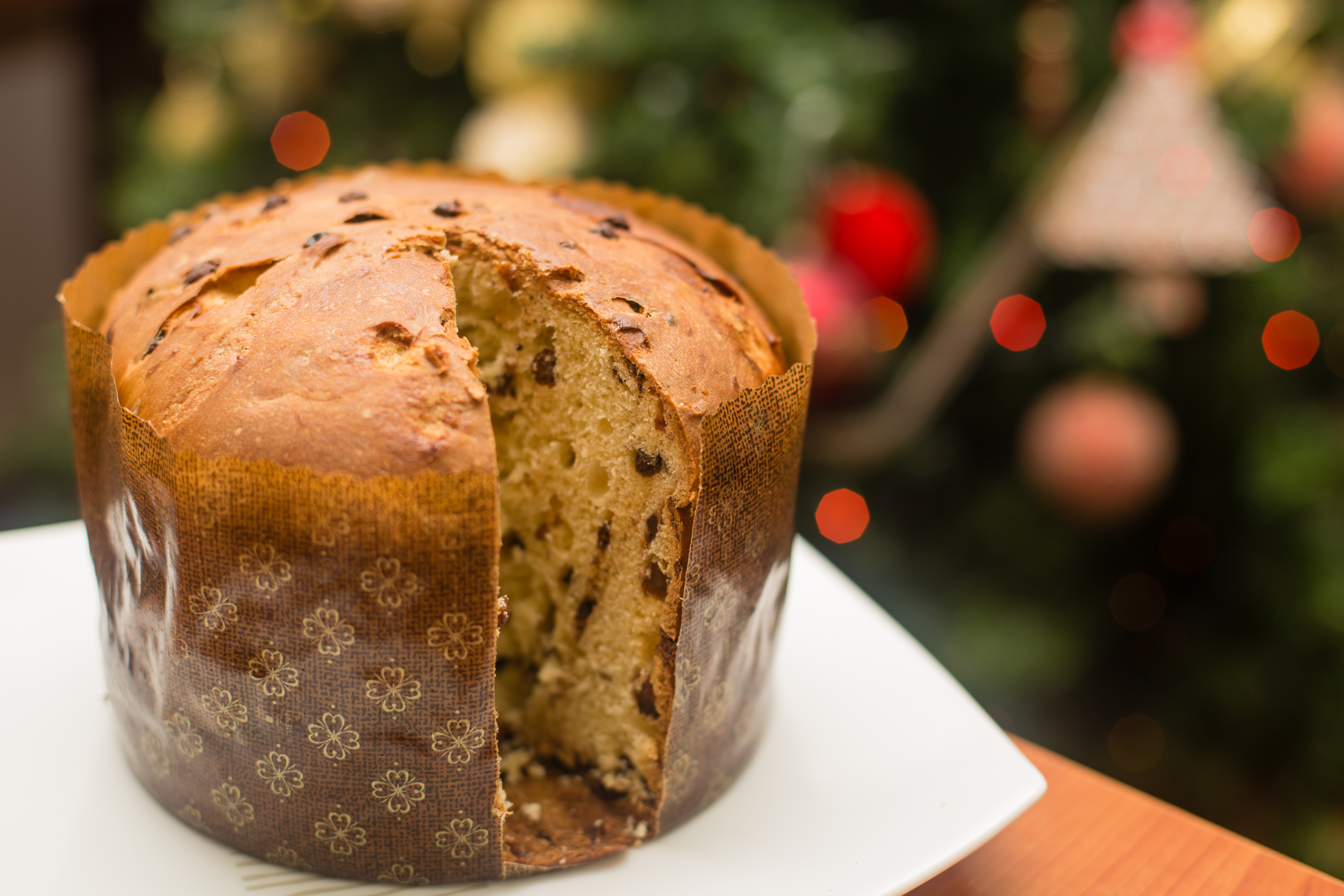
Panettone; due to the Italian influence on Eritrea, this bread is commonly served with tea or during the coffee ceremony

== History ==
The Italian Eritrean cuisine started to be practiced during the colonial times of the Kingdom of Italy, when a large number of Italians moved to Eritrea. They brought the use of pasta to Italian Eritrea, and it is a staple food eaten in present-day Asmara.

Eritrean restaurants include more Italian options, such as spaghetti or lasagna, in what amounts to a hearty embrace of their former colonial rulers. The Italians, after all, gave Eritrea not only a name and a suspiciously Italy-shaped border, but they also gave Eritreans an easily grasped identity—and therefore, arguably, their first taste of nationalistic pride. Tim Carman

It is more common to find people eating the Italian Eritrean cuisine in the capital, Asmara. Asmara has been regarded as "New Rome" or "Italy's African City" due to its Italian influence, not only in the architecture, but also for the wide streets, piazzas and coffee bars. In the boulevards, lined with palms and trees, there are many bars, restaurants and cafes, serving cappuccinos and lattes, as well as gelato parlours. Many Eritreans drink the espresso coffee, made using original Italian machinery. Pizza is one of the favorite foods of the young people in Asmara.

== Some popular dishes ==
- Eritrean styled lasagna
- Cotoletta alla milanese (Milano cutlet)
- Capretto
- Spaghetti Bolognese, (Pasta al Sugo e Berbere)
- Frittata
- Panettone
- Pasta Al forno
- Pizza

== Bibliography ==
- Capatti, Alberto and Montanari, Massimo. Italian Cuisine: a Cultural History. New York: Columbia University Press, 2003. ISBN 0-231-12232-2
- Dickie, John. Delizia! The Epic History of Italians and Their Food (New York, 2008)

== See also ==
- Eritrean cuisine
- Italian cuisine
