= Zigni =

Stew from Eritrea and Ethiopia

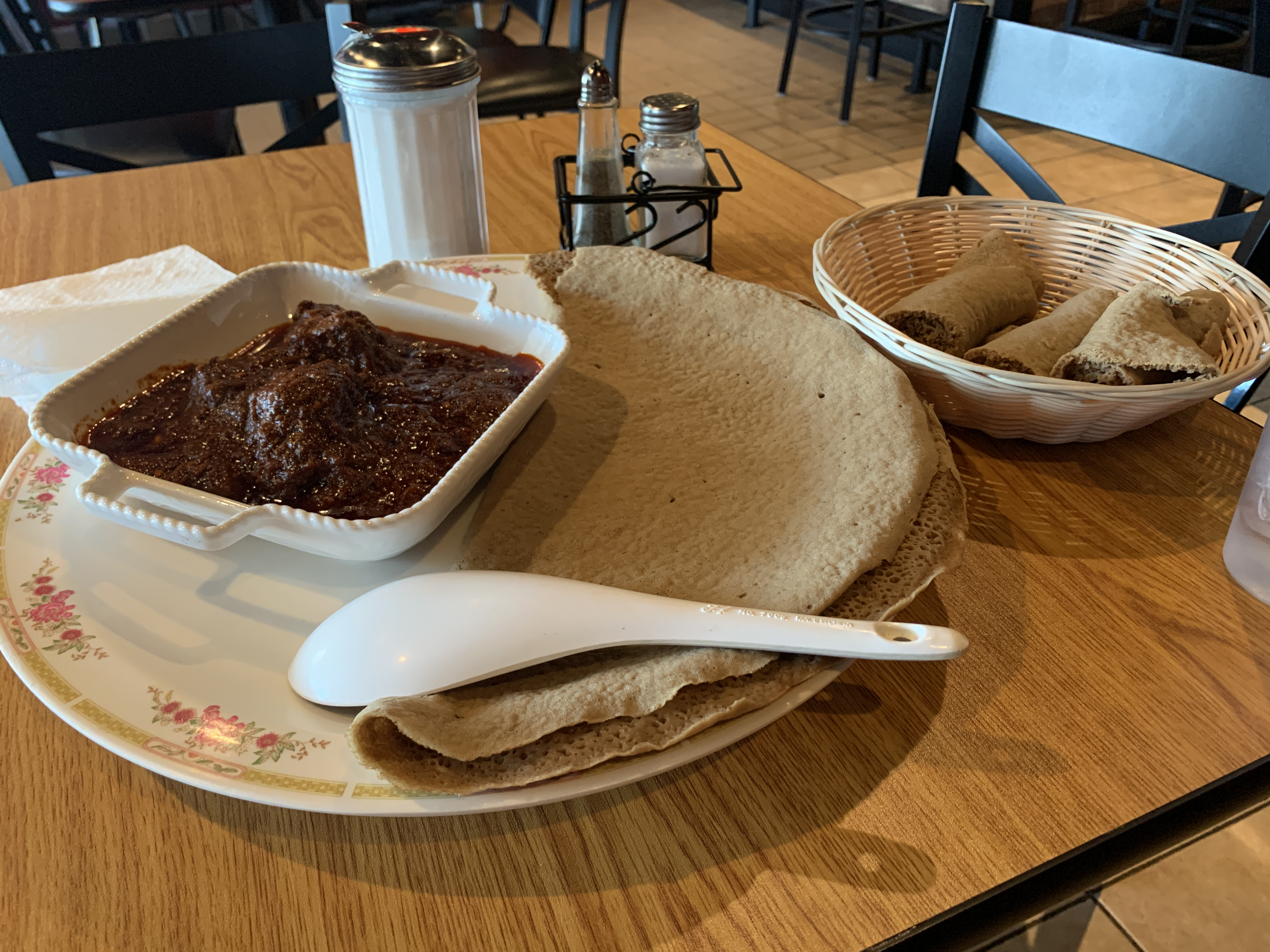
- Zigni with injera
- Type: Entrée
- Place of origin: Eritrea Ethiopia
- Region or state: East Africa
- Main ingredients: meat, tomatoes, red onions and Berbere spices

Zigni (Tigrinya: ዝግኒ), kaih tsebhi (Tigrinya: ቀይሕ ጸብሒ) or kai wat (Amharic: ቀይ ወጥ) is a popular Eritrean and Ethiopian stew (tsebhi or wat) made from meat, tomatoes, red onions and Berbere spices. The meat can be beef, lamb, goat, or chicken and usually placed on a plate of injera, a type of unleavened bread made from teff flour. It can be eaten for lunch or dinner. The dish requires a relatively long amount of time but not a lot of active effort to make. The traditional recipe can take as long as five to six hours to prepare. As such, it is sometimes reserved for special occasions. The Berbere spices can make the zigni spicy and give it a red color.

It is considered to be the national dish of Eritrea.

== Background ==
A traditional component of Eritrean cuisine is tsebhi, which are meat stews served with injera. This is similar to Ethiopian cuisine, as the history is shared by both groups of people. However, Ethiopians use Amharic names whereas Eritreans use Tigrinya names. There are also similarities with Somali cuisine. Eritreans also tend to use less seasoned butter than the Ethiopian counterparts, making the dishes a bit lighter. The Italians colonized Eritrea which influenced the dish. For example, the use of tomatoes demonstrates the Italian influence. Cumin and curry powder reflect the Middle Eastern influence.

== Preparation ==
The meat is first cooked and then tomatoes and red onions are added. After being slow-cooked for hours, the spices are added. The dish also traditionally uses a clarified butter called t’esmi that resembles ghee but is seasoned with herbs and spices.

== Storage ==
In an airtight container, zigni can be stored for three days in the refrigerator or one month in the freezer.
