= Tihlo =

Ethiopian snack

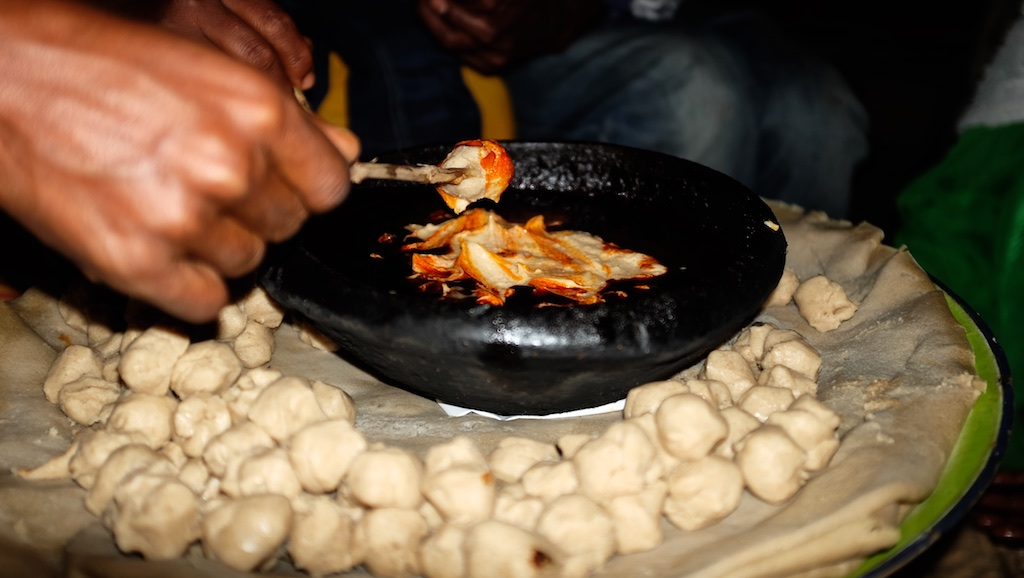
- Tihlo with meat and berbere sauce and yogurt
- Course: Meal or snack
- Place of origin: Tigray, Ethiopia
- Region or state: Agame
- Main ingredients: Barley; Tsebhi

Tihlo (Tigrinya: ጥሕሎ) is a dish from the historical Agame province in Tigray, often served as a snack, that consists of barley dough balls covered with meat and berbere-based sauce. Tihlo is commonly consumed as a side dish or snack, especially in Tigrayan communities.

== Overview ==
The barley grain is completely dehulled and milled. Tihlo is made using moistened roasted barley flour that is kneaded to a uniform consistency. The dough is then broken into small balls and laid out around a bowl of spicy meat stew. A two-pronged wooden fork known as a shint’ar (ሽንጣር) is used to spear the ball and dip it into the stew.

Tihlo is commonly served on cultural holidays.

== See also ==
- Injera
- List of African dishes
- List of Ethiopian dishes and foods
