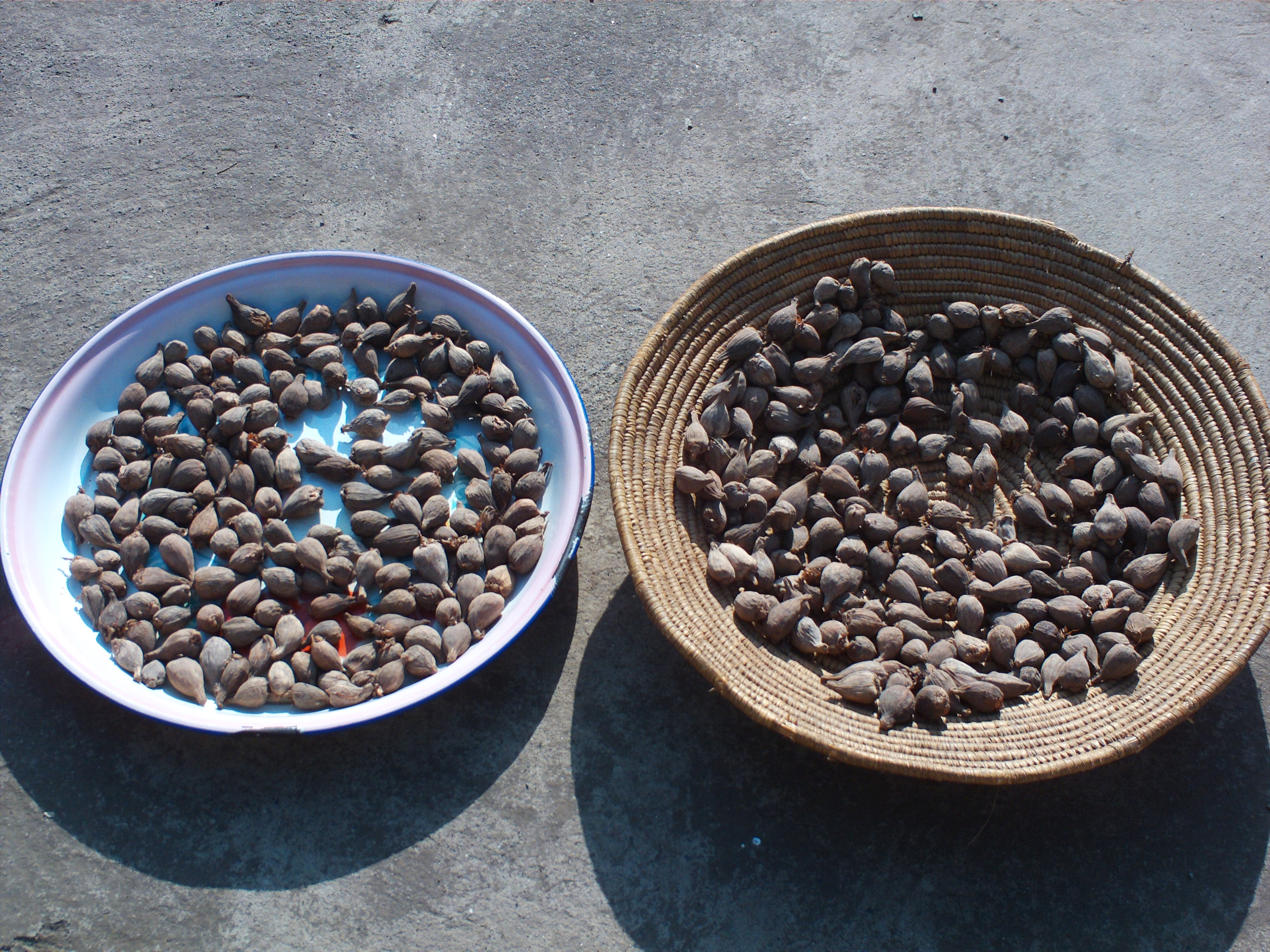
- Dried korarima fruits, in preparation for making berbere

Conservation status
- Least Concern (IUCN 3.1)

Scientific classification
- Kingdom: Plantae
- Clade: Tracheophytes
- Clade: Angiosperms
- Clade: Monocots
- Clade: Commelinids
- Order: Zingiberales
- Family: Zingiberaceae
- Genus: Aframomum
- Species: A. corrorima

Binomial name
- Aframomum corrorima (A.Braun) P.C.M.Jansen

Synonyms
- Amomum corrorima A.Braun (basionym)

= Aframomum corrorima =

Species of plant in the ginger family

Aframomum corrorima is a species of flowering plant in the ginger family, Zingiberaceae. It is an herbaceous perennial that produces leafy stems 1–2 meters tall from rhizomatous roots. The alternately-arranged leaves are dark green, 10–30 cm long and 2.5–6 cm across, elliptical to oblong in shape. Pink flowers are borne near the ground and give way to red, fleshy fruits containing shiny brown seeds, which are typically 3–5 mm in diameter.

The spice, known as Ethiopian cardamom, false cardamom, or korarima, is obtained from the plant's seeds (usually dried), and is extensively used in Ethiopian and Eritrean cuisine. It is an ingredient in berbere, mitmita, awaze, and other spice mixtures, and is also used to flavor coffee. Its flavor is comparable to that of the closely related Elettaria cardamomum or green cardamom. In Ethiopian herbal medicine, the seeds are used as a tonic, carminative, and laxative.

The plant is native to Tanzania, western Ethiopia (in the vicinity of Lake Tana and Gelemso), southwestern Sudan, western Uganda. It is cultivated in both Ethiopia and Eritrea, although the fruits are typically harvested from wild plants. The dried fruits are widely sold in markets and are relatively expensive, while fresh fruits are sold in production areas.

In dried seeds and pods, the major oil components are 1,8-cineole (eucalyptol) and (E)-nerolidol. In fresh seeds, the major component of the essential oil is 1,8-cineole, followed by sabinene and geraniol. In fresh pods, the major oil constituents are γ-terpinene, β-pinene, α-phellandrene, 1,8-cineole, and p-cymene.

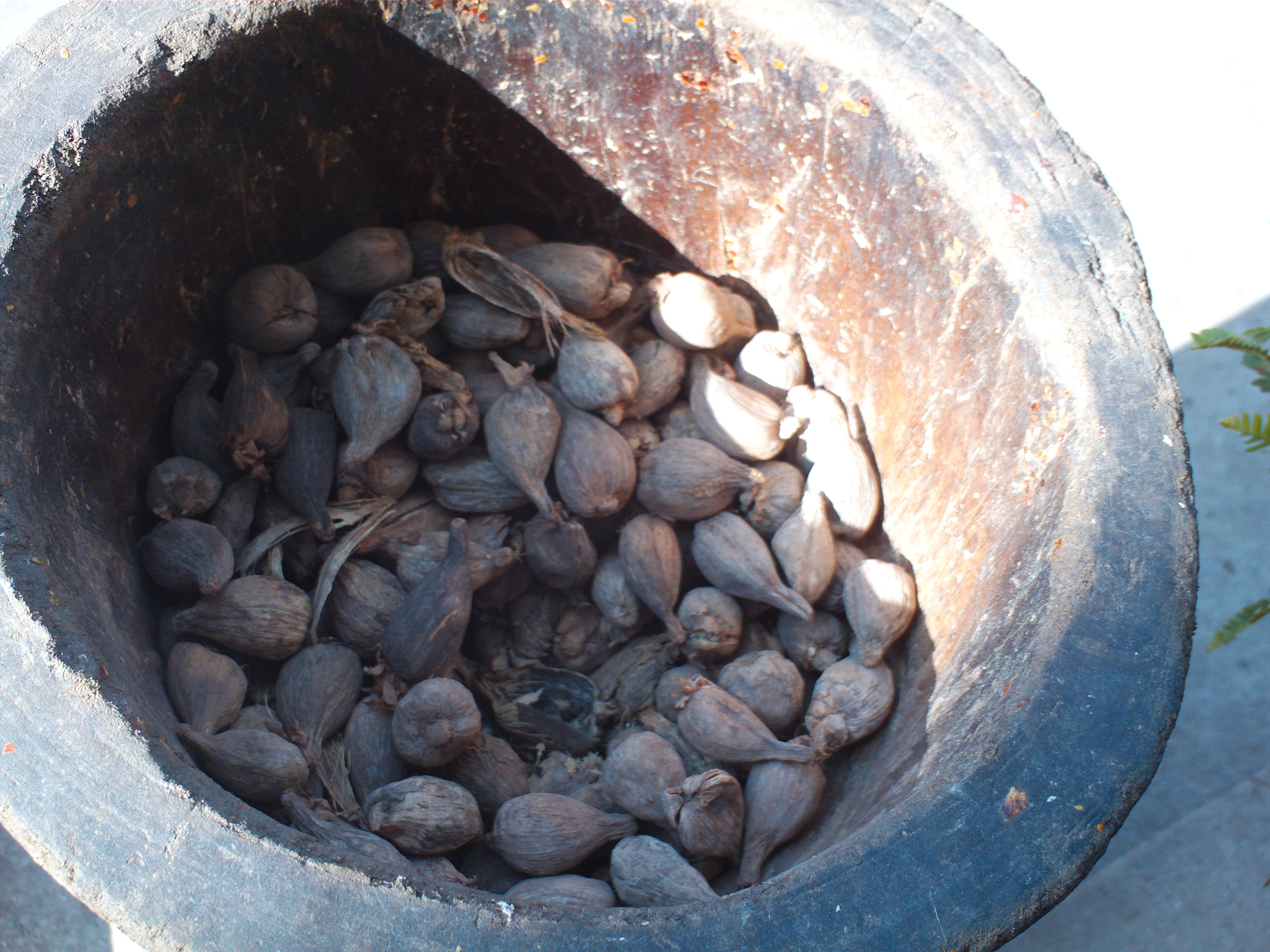
Korarima fruits in a mortar, ready to be crushed .

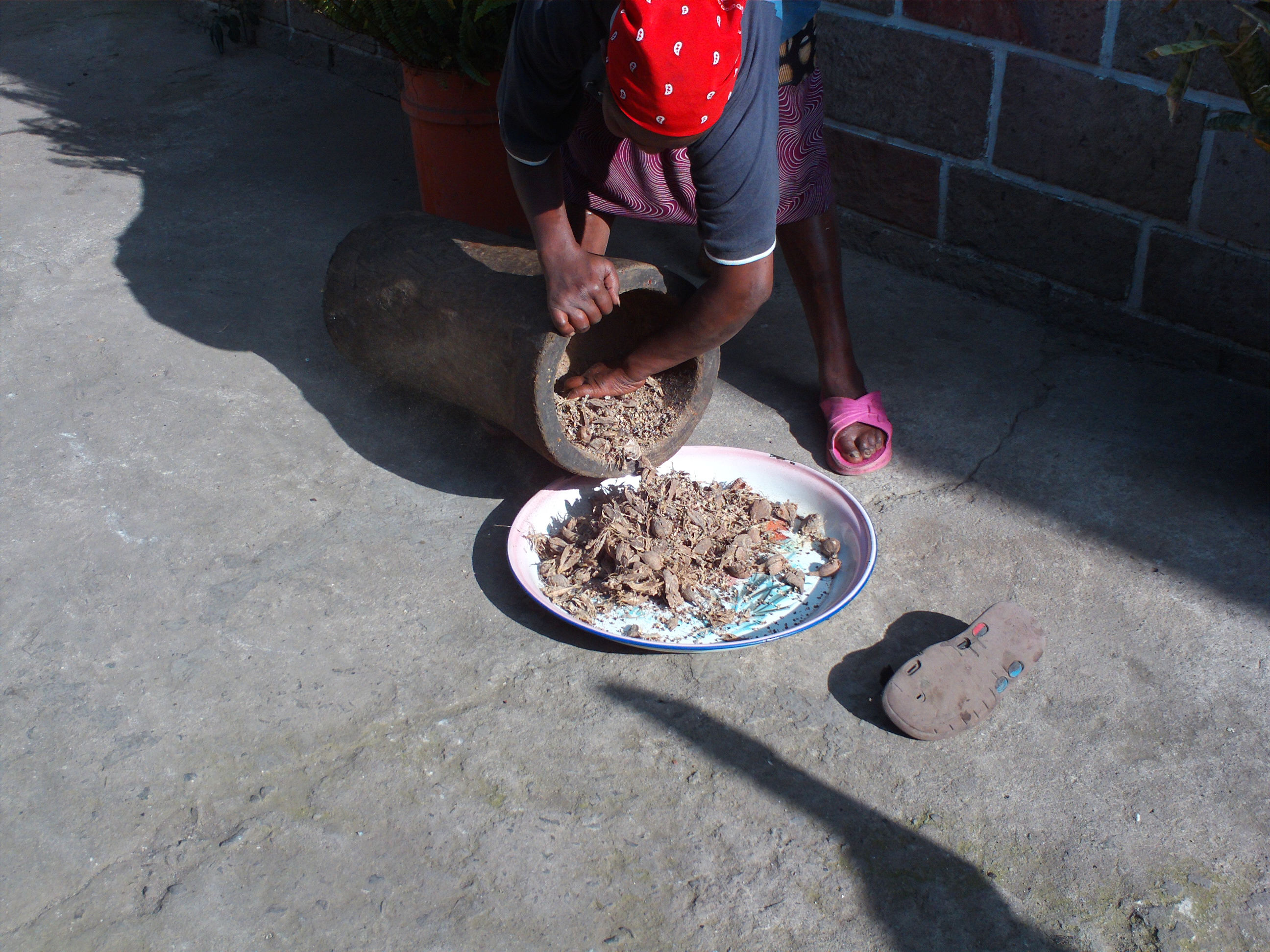
Korarima pods, crushed in a large mortar to facilitate removal of the seeds.

== See also ==
- Aframomum melegueta
- Cardamom
- List of Ethiopian dishes and foods
