= Wat (food) =

Ethiopian and Eritrean stew or curry

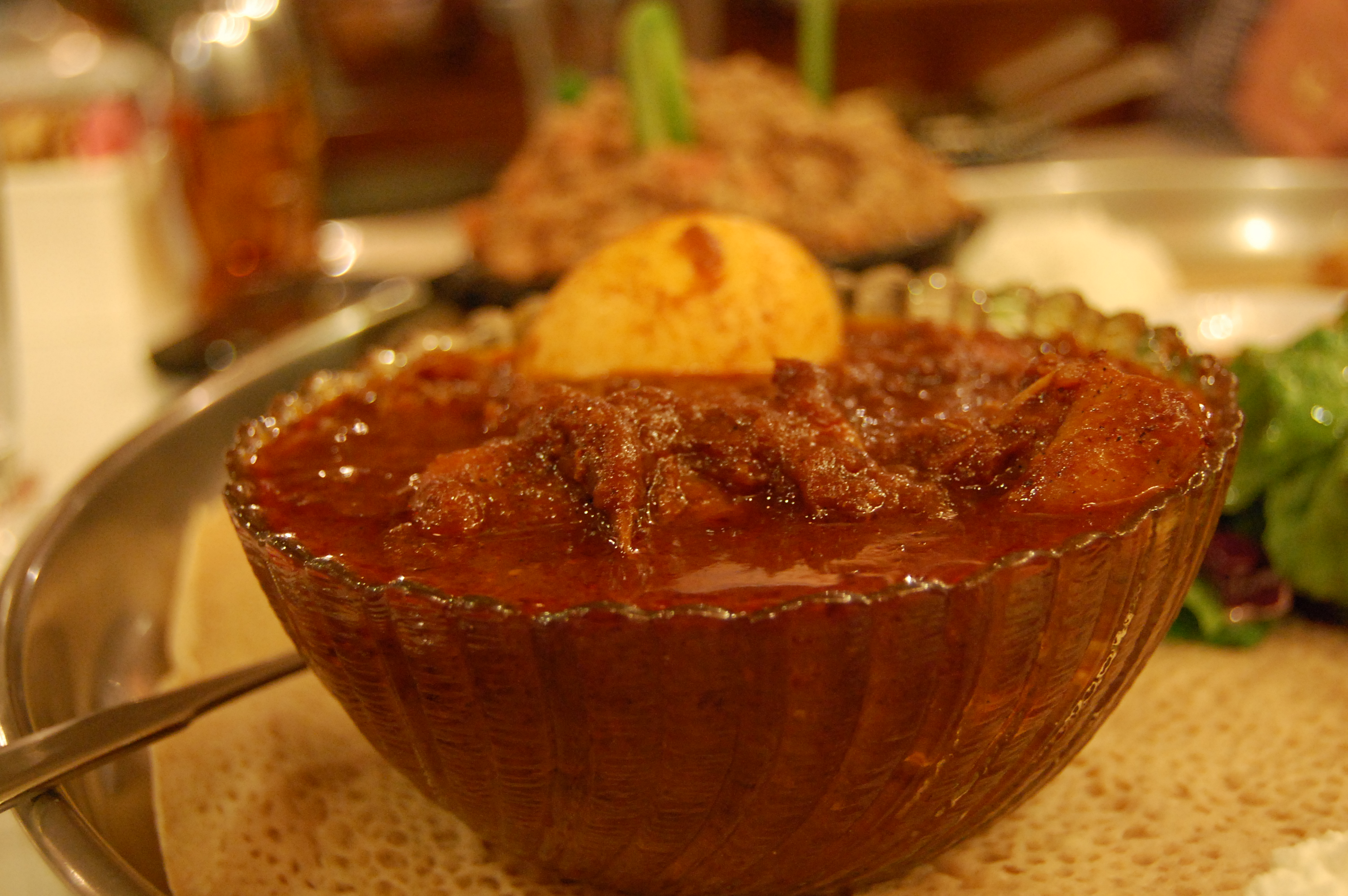
- Alternative names: Wet, tsebhi, ito
- Type: Stew
- Place of origin: Ethiopia and Eritrea
- Region or state: East Africa
- Main ingredients: Meat (chicken, beef, or lamb), vegetables, niter kibbeh, spices

Wat or wet (Amharic: ወጥ, IPA: [wətʼ]) or ito (Oromo: Ittoo) or tsebhi (Tigrinya: ጸብሒ, IPA: [sʼɐbħi]) is an Ethiopian and Eritrean stew that may be prepared with chicken, beef, lamb, a variety of vegetables, spice mixtures such as berbere (hot variety), and niter kibbeh, a seasoned clarified butter.

== Overview ==
Several properties distinguish wats from stews of other cultures. Perhaps the most obvious is an unusual cooking technique: the preparation of a wat begins with chopped onions slow-cooked, without any fat or oil, in a dry skillet or pot until much of their moisture has been driven away. Fat (usually niter kibbeh) is then added, and the onions and other aromatics are sautéed before the addition of other ingredients. This method causes the onions to break down and thicken the stew.

Wat is traditionally eaten with injera, a spongy flat bread made from the millet-like grain known as teff. There are many types of wats. The popular ones are doro wat and siga wat (Amharic: ሥጋ śigā), made with beef.

=== Doro wat ===
Doro wat (Amharic: ዶሮ ወጥ, romanized: dōrō we̱t, Tigrinya: ጸብሒ ደርሆ, romanized: tsebhi derhō), is a spicy stew made of chicken. The cooking often (but not always) includes the addition of peeled but undivided hard-boiled egg. It is the most popular traditional food in Eritrea and Ethiopia. Considered the national dish, it is the food of choice during formal and informal gatherings, eaten together as part of a group who share a communal bowl and basket of injera. It is eaten only on special occasions since it takes approximately 10 hours to prepare adequately.

==== Sanbat wat ====
A Jewish version of doro wat, called "sanbat wat" (Sabbath wat), is eaten by the Beta Israel (Ethiopian Jews). Sanbat wat is a traditional Shabbat dish. In order to avoid mixing of meat and dairy, vegetable oil can be used as a pareve substitute in lieu of niter kibbeh. Yeqimem zeyet, a form of niter kibbeh made from vegetable oil, can also be used.

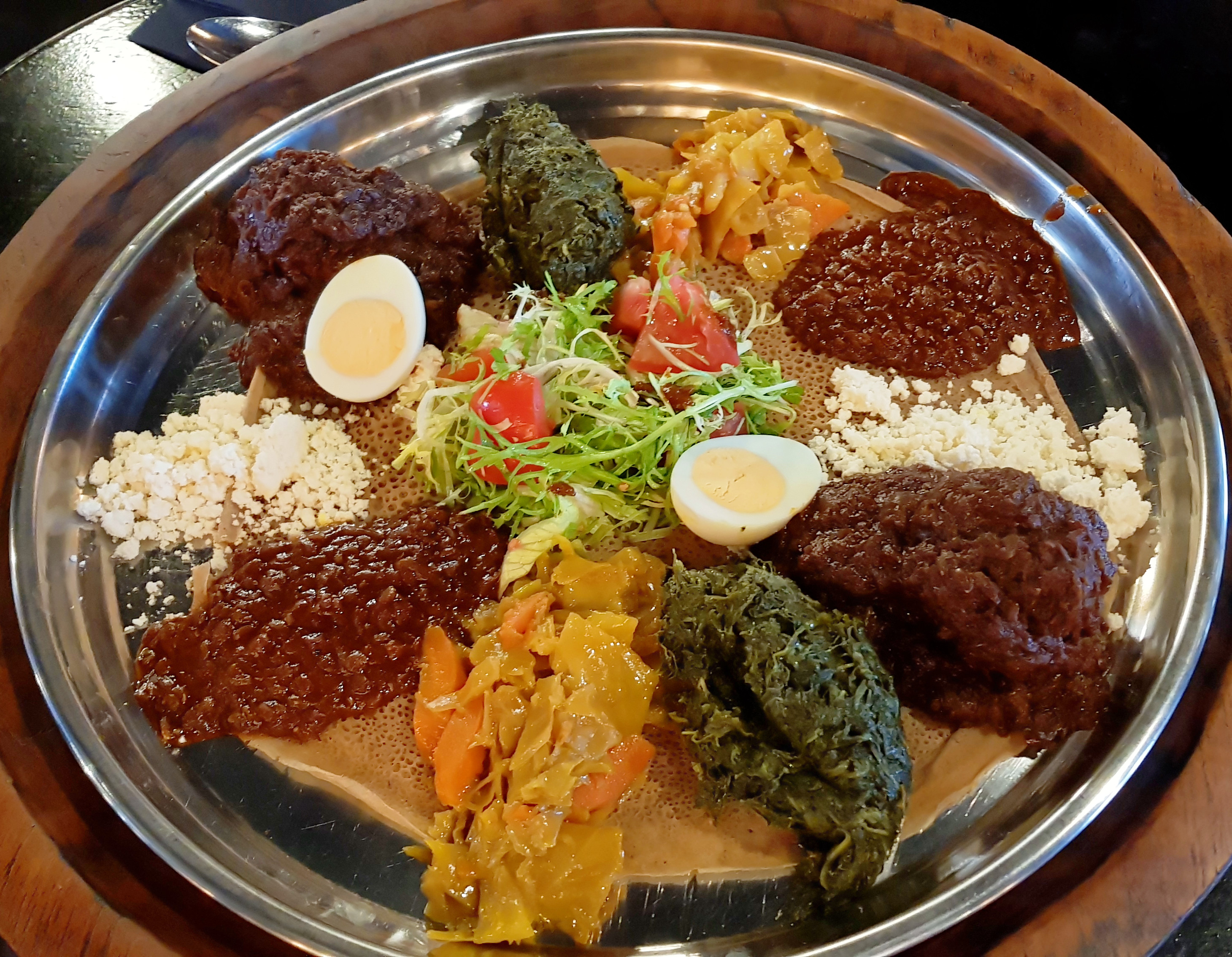
A formal serving of wat atop an injera

=== Misir wat ===
Misir wat is a lentil stew; its key ingredients include split red lentils, garlic, onions, and spices. It is a popular vegan dish, and in high demand during fasting periods for Orthodox Christians.

== History ==
Because wat is customarily served on injera and consumed together with it, the history of injera is closely connected to the development of wot as a dish.

Although teff and griddle-like trays appeared in Aksumite archaeology, no scholars stated that injera was the staple food in the kingdom of Aksum and that the people consumed teff injera. The custom of consuming teff spread over a period of 250 years from the 1520s. By around 1750 it had become a primary staple in northern Ethiopia. Early mentions of injera appeared only in records produced after the fourteenth century. A book titled Ser'ata Gebr (ስርዓተ ግብር) written by royal chronicles during the time of Empero Zera Yaqob includes lists of items provided during in the court and the term injera appears among the foods recorded. The travel narrative of Francisco Alvares, who lived in Ethiopia during the 1520s, indicates that teff was not yet the main grain used in the kingdom at that time. Jesuit writer and missionary Father Joao de Barradas, who worked in Ethiopia between 1624 and 1633, provided detailed descriptions of royal banquets and courtly meals in Gondar. In these accounts, Barradas refers to a flatbread he called apas. Richard Pankhurst points out that the food identified as apa by the Jesuits corresponds to what is known today as injera. The Spanish Jesuit missionary Pedro Paez who arrived in Ethiopia in 1603 recorded that Emperor Susenyos told him teff was initially eaten by the poor during times of scarcity. During the Gondarine period, the habit of eating teff bread became increasingly common among the royal family and the nobility. By 1751, the travel account of Prutky describes teff as the prized grain that was most extensively grown and consumed in the Kingdom. He also noted that injera was eaten with raw meat, grilled meat and curd. By the early 1770s, when James Bruce traveled through northern Ethiopia, he noted that teff-based injera had spread widely throughout the region and had become a staple food in the Ethiopian Kingdom. In the early 1840s, the British Empire sent an embassy to the court of King Sahle Selassie of Shewa, led by W.C. Harris, who remained in Ethiopia from1841 to 1843. In his published travel account, Harris reported that in Shewa, injera was eaten with "a stimulating pottage of onions, red pepper, and salt," a description corresponding to the dish now known as wot. This is the earliest textual reference to wat in connection with injera.

== See also ==
- Beyaynetu
- Kai wat
- List of African dishes
- List of Ethiopian dishes and foods
- List of stews
