= Mitmita =

Ethiopian spice mixture

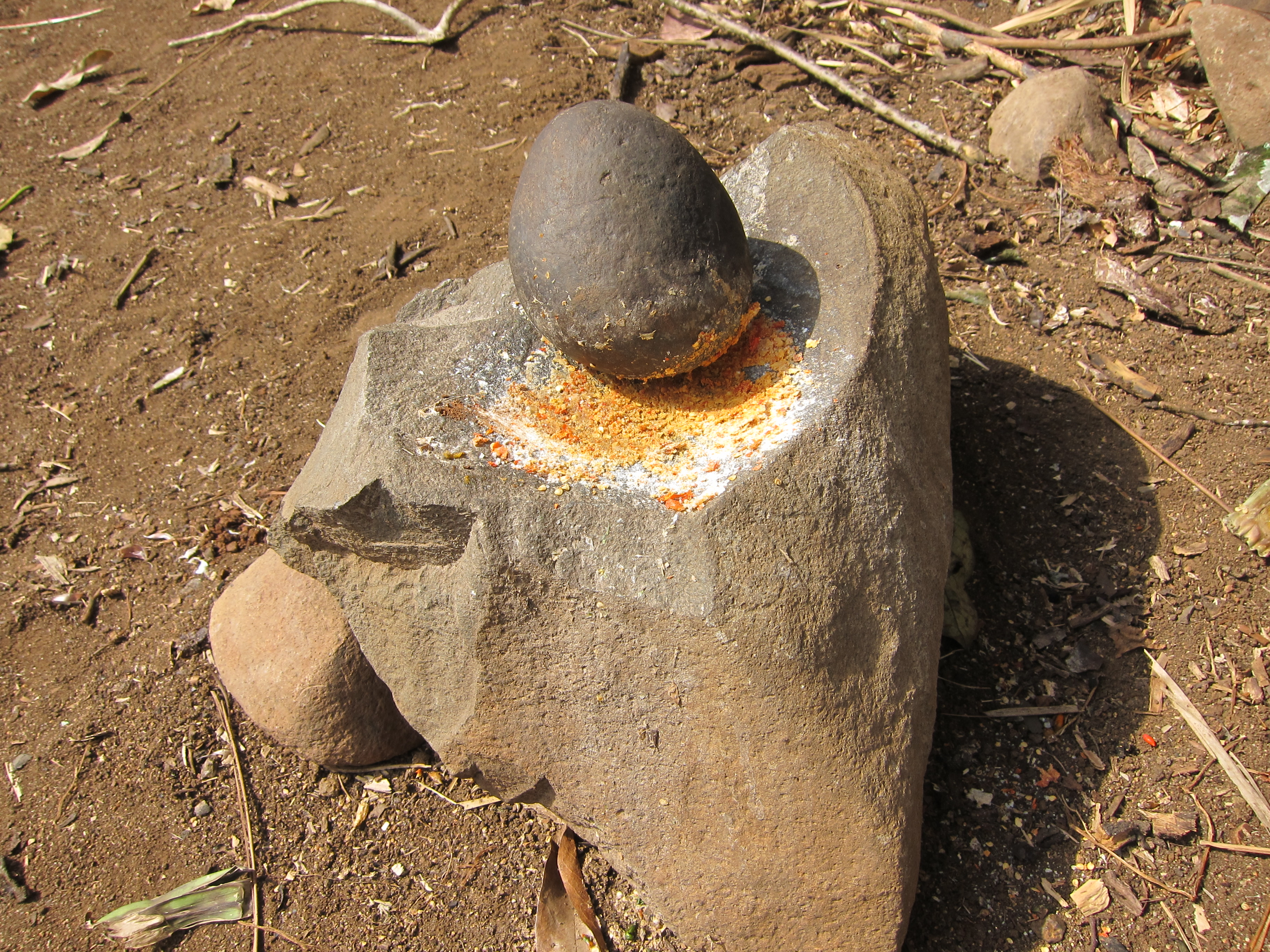
- Mitmita ingredients, partially ground in a mortar, with pestle
- Type: Spices
- Place of origin: Ethiopia
- Main ingredients: Piri piri, Ethiopian cardamom, cloves, salt

Mitmita (Amharic: ሚጥሚጣ, IPA: [mitʼmitʼa]) is a powdered seasoning mix used in Ethiopia. It is orange-red in color and contains ground African bird's eye chili peppers, Ethiopian cardamom (korerima), cloves, and salt. It occasionally has other spices including cinnamon, cumin, and ginger.

The mixture is used to season the raw beef dish kitfo and may also be sprinkled on ful medames (fava beans). In addition, mitmita may be presented as a condiment and sprinkled on other dishes or spooned onto a piece of injera, so that morsels may be lightly dipped into it. It is generally made from hot peppers that are stronger than those used in berbere, the other main spice in Ethiopian cuisine.

== See also ==
- Berbere, another Ethiopian spice mixture
- Awaze, Ethiopian spice paste
