= Eritrean cuisine =

Culinary tradition

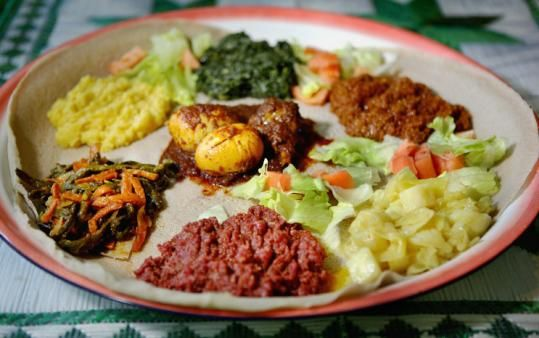
A plate of injera with various Eritrean stews

Eritrean cuisine is based on Eritrea's native culinary traditions, but also arises from social interchanges with other regions. The local cuisine shares very strong similarities with the cuisine of neighboring Ethiopia with several dishes being cultural to both nations as a result of the two nations having been unified for hundreds of years. It also has influences from Italian cuisine due to the Italian colonization of the nation, and minor influences from other cuisines in the region.

== Overview ==
Eritrean cuisine shares similarities with surrounding countries' cuisines; however, the cuisine has its unique characteristics.

The main traditional food in Eritrean cuisine is tsebhi (stew), served with injera (flatbread made from teff, wheat, or sorghum and hilbet (paste made from legumes; mainly lentil and faba beans). A typical traditional Eritrean dish consists of injera accompanied by a spicy stew, which frequently includes beef, goat, lamb or fish.

Overall, Eritrean cuisine strongly resembles that of neighboring Ethiopia, although Eritrean cooking tends to feature more seafood than Ethiopian cuisine on account of its coastal location.

Additionally, owing to its colonial history, cuisine in Eritrea features more Italian influences than are present in Ethiopian cooking, including more pasta specials and greater use of curry powders and cumin. People in Eritrea likewise tend to drink coffee. Christian Eritreans also drink sowa (a bitter fermented barley) and mies (a fermented honey beverage), while Muslim Eritreans abstain from drinking alcohol.

== Common foods and dishes ==
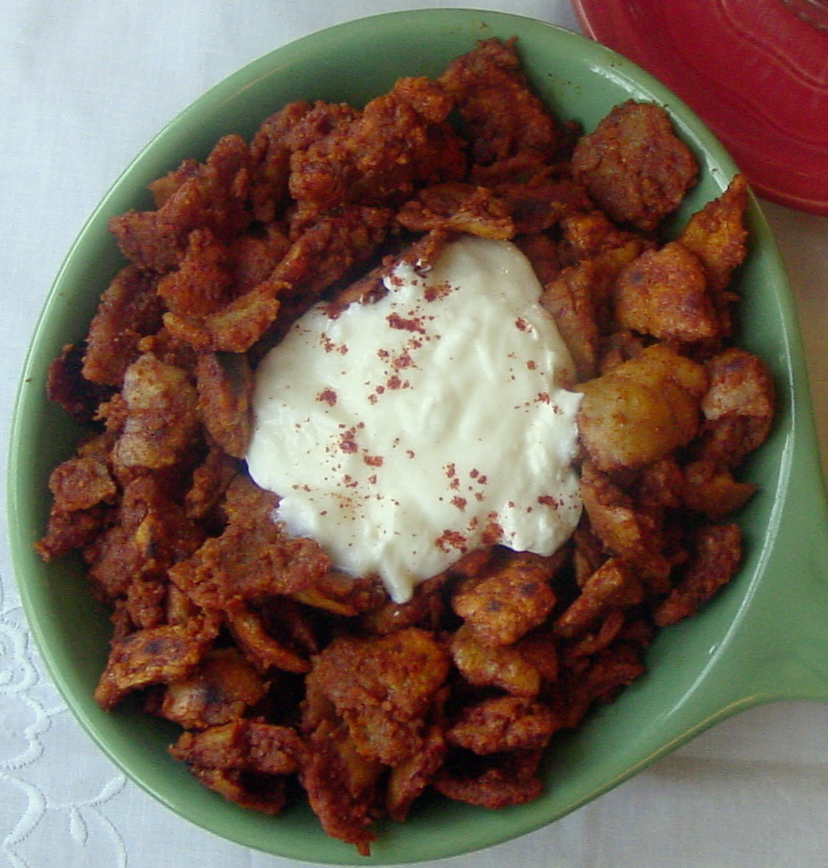
Kitcha fit-fit is a staple of Eritrean cuisine. It consists of shredded, oiled, and spiced bread, often served with a scoop of fresh yogurt and topped with berbere (spice).

When eating injera diners generally share food from a large tray placed in the centre of a low dining table. Numerous pieces of injera are layered on this tray and topped with various spicy stews. Diners break into the section of injera in front of them, tearing off pieces and dipping them into the stews.

The stews that accompany injera are usually made from beef, chicken, lamb, goat, mutton, or vegetables. Most Eritreans, with the exception of the Saho, like their food spicy and hot. Berbere, a mixture that consists of a variety of common and unusual herbs and spices, accompanies almost all dishes. Stews include zigni, made with beef; dorho tsebhi, made with chicken; alicha, a vegetable dish made without berbere; and shiro, a purée of various legumes.

When making ga'at, a ladle is used to make an indentation in the dough, which is then filled with a mixture of berbere and melted butter, and surrounded by milk or yogurt. When dining, a small piece of ga'at is dipped into the berbere and the butter sauce, and then into the milk or yogurt.

Influenced by its past as an Italian colony, Eritrean cuisine also features unique interpretations of classic Italian dishes. Among these specialties are pasta sauces spiced with berbere.

== Breakfast ==
- Kitcha fit-fit, a dish made from cut-up pieces of a hearty pancake tossed in clarified butter and spices. The pancake is usually made of different types of flour, or dry porridge mixed with water and other seasonings. The heat can be adjusted by pouring more or less berbere (the hot spice) on the kitcha when it is finished. Normally served for breakfast with a side of yogurt or sour milk.
- Fit-fit, made with torn up pieces of injera and usually leftover stew. It can also be made with a mixture of onions, berbere, tomatoes, jalapeños and butter instead of leftover stews. Also called fir-fir.

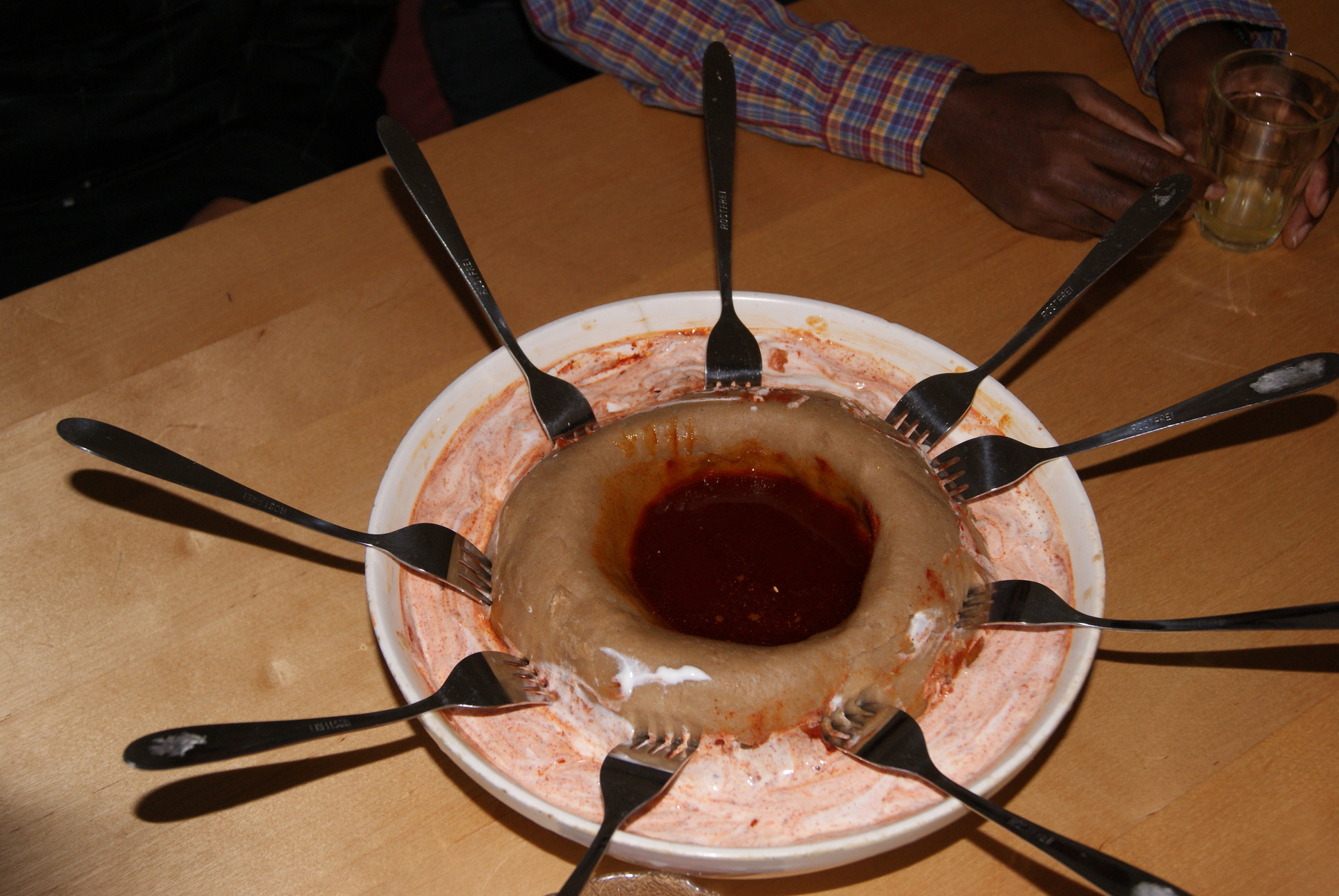
Ga'at or akelet is an Eritrean porridge

- Ga'at or akelet, a porridge made of flour and water, served in a bowl with an indentation made in the center where clarified butter and berbere are mixed; yogurt is normally put on the sides surrounding it. It is similar and related to other stiff African porridge dishes like ugali, pap and fufu.
- Shahan ful, sauteed and mashed fava beans, served with onions, tomatoes, jalapeños, cumin, yogurt and olive oil. It is normally eaten with pieces of bread dipped in the dish to scoop out the bean mixture.
- Panettone; due to Italian influence on Eritrea, this bread is commonly served with tea or during the coffee ceremony.

== Lunch/dinner ==
Most dishes common to Eritrea are either meat-based or vegetable-based stews that are served over the spongy, fermented bread injera.

- Tsebhi/Zigni—a spicy stew made with lamb, mutton, cubes of beef or ground beef and berbere
- Dorho—a spicy stew made with berbere and a whole chicken
- Qulwa/Tibsi—sauteed meat, onions, and berbere served with a sauce
- Alicha—a non-berbere dish made with potatoes, green beans, carrots, green peppers, and turmeric.
- Tihlo–a dish consisting of unfilled dumpling balls made from barley, to be dipped in a spicy meat stew.
- Hilbet—a vegan dish consisting of a cream made from powdered fenugreek, lentils and fava beans, typically served with Silsi, tomatoes cooked with berbere.
- Shiro—a stew made with ground chickpea flour, onions and tomatoes
- Birsen—lentils, often cooked with onions, spices, and tomatoes. This curry can be made with or without berbere.
- Hamli—sauteed spinach, garlic and onions

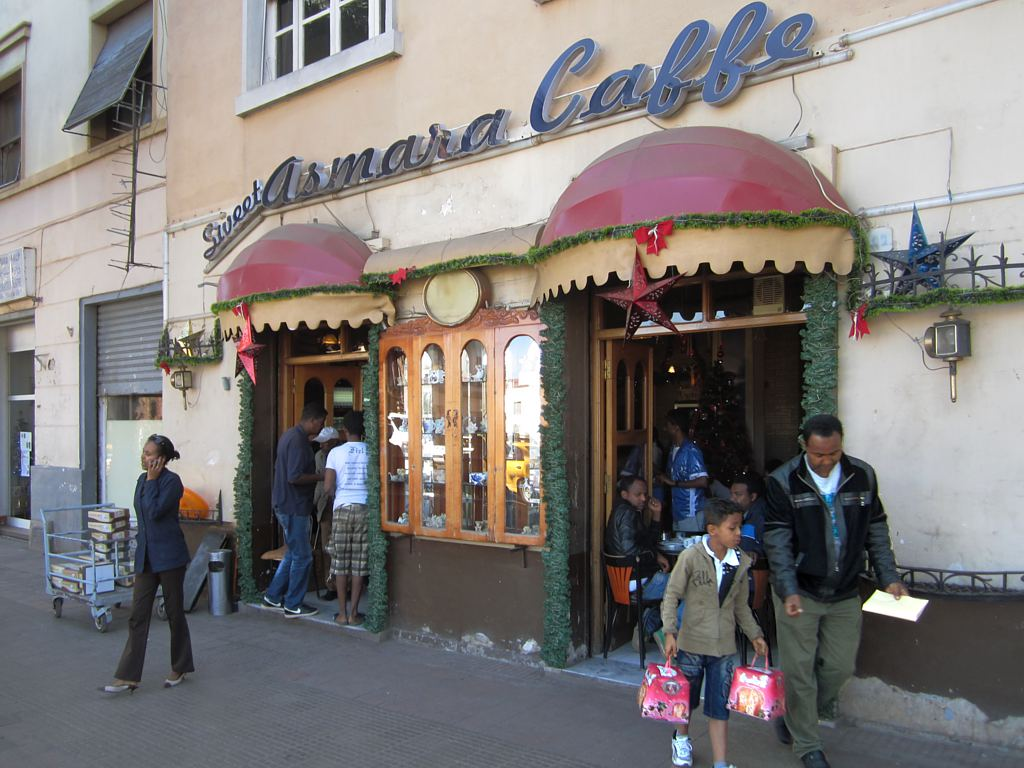
A typical cafe in Asmara selling panettone during Christmas

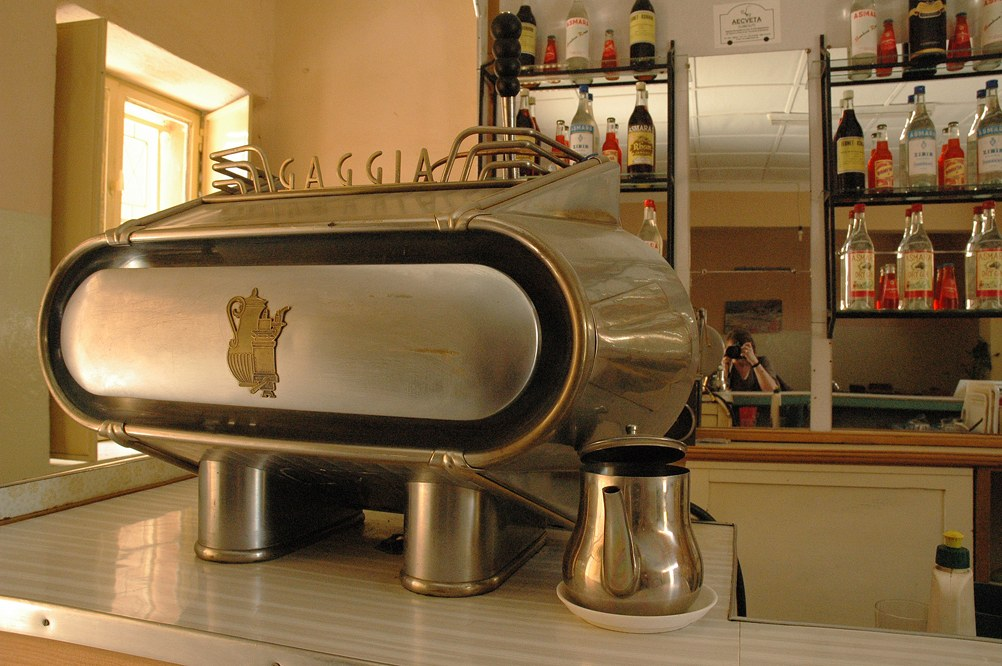
A vintage Gaggia espresso machine in a bar in Eritrea

== Beverages ==
Suwa is the name for the home-brewed beer common in Eritrea. It is made from roasted corn, barley, and other grain and is flavored with gesho, a type of buckthorn leaf. The beverage is often made for celebrations; a sweet honey wine (called mies) is also commonly served. The coffee ceremony is one of the most important and recognizable parts of Eritrean cultures. Coffee is offered when visiting friends, during festivities, or as a daily staple of life. If coffee is politely declined, then tea (shahee) will most likely be served.

Even though Eritrea has a tradition of coffee drinking for centuries, Italian-style coffee like espresso and cappuccino are extremely common in Eritrea, served in practically every bar and coffee shop in the capital Asmara.

The biggest brewery in the country is Asmara Brewery, built 1939 under the name Melotti. The brewery today produces a range of beverages. A popular beverage that is common during festivities is Eritrean-style Sambuca; in Tigrinya it is translated to areki.

== List of common Italian Eritrean dishes or food ==
- Eritrean-style lasagna
- Cotoletta alla milanese (Milano cutlet)
- Capretto
- Spaghetti bolognese (pasta al sugo e berbere)
- Frittata
- Panettone
- Pasta al forno
- Pizza
- Gelato
- Panna cotta

== See also ==
- List of African cuisines
- Italian Eritrean cuisine
