= Awaze =

Ethiopian condiment

- Alternative names: Red pepper paste
- Type: Condiment
- Place of origin: Ethiopia
- Associated cuisine: Ethiopian cuisine

Awaze is a spicy condiment from Ethiopian cuisine.

== Description ==
The condiment is a fermented red pepper paste made with a variety of spices, including onion, ginger, garlic, rosemary, thyme, coriander, cinnamon, cardamom, fenugreek, and cumin. Most households use their own recipe for making awaze. It is used as both a condiment and a marinade, and may be considered a form of hot sauce. Varieties include berbere awaze and mitmita awaze.

== See also ==
- Harissa, a similar condiment from Maghrebi cuisine
- Gochujang, a similar condiment from Korean cuisine
