= Ful medames =

Egyptian dish of cooked fava beans

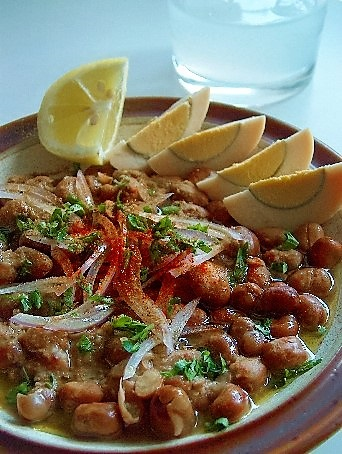
- Alternative names: Ful
- Place of origin: Egypt
- Region or state: MENA
- Main ingredients: Fava beans, vegetable oil, cumin
- Variations: Lemon juice, onion, parsley, garlic

Ful medames (Arabic: فول مدمّس, romanized: fūl mudammas, Egyptian Arabic pronunciation: [ˈfuːl meˈdæmmes], lit. 'buried favas'; other spellings include foule mudammes), or simply ful, is a stew of cooked fava beans served with olive oil, cumin, and optionally with chopped parsley, garlic, onion, lemon juice, chili pepper and other vegetables, herbs, and spices. Ful medames is traditionally made in and served out of a large metal jug. It is notably a staple food in Egypt and is considered a national dish.

== History ==
Some writers have suggested that ful medames dated all the way back to Ancient Egypt.

Some evidence of the use of ful is a cache of 2,600 dried fava beans unearthed at a late Neolithic site on the outskirts of Nazareth.

This dish is mentioned in the Jerusalem Talmud, indicating that it was used in Middle Eastern countries since the fourth century. Although there are countless ways of embellishing fūl, the basic recipe remains the same. Once the fūl is cooked, it is salted and eaten plain or accompanied by vegetable oil, corn oil, butter, clarified butter, buffalo milk, béchamel sauce, cured beef (basturma), fried or boiled eggs, tomato sauce, garlic sauce, tahini, fresh lemon juice, chili peppers, or other ingredients.

In the Middle Ages, the making of fūl in Cairo was monopolized by the people living around the Princess Baths, a public bath in a tiny compound near today's public fountain of Muhammad ‘Ali Pasha, a block north of the two elegant minarets of the Mosque of Sultan al-Muayyad above the 11th century Bab Zuweila gate. During the day, bath attendants stoked the fires heating the qidras, which are huge pots of bath water. Wood was scarce, so garbage was used as fuel and eventually a dump grew around the baths. When the baths closed, the red embers of the fires continued to burn. To take advantage of these precious fires, huge qidras were filled with fava beans, and these cauldrons were kept simmering all night, and eventually all day too, in order to provide breakfast for Cairo's population. Cookshops throughout Cairo would send their minions to the Princess Baths to buy their wholesale fūl.

In 1860, Orientalist Edward William Lane described beans being cooked in a pear-shaped earthenware which was "buried, all but the neck, in the hot ashes of an oven or a [Turkish] bath, and having the mouth closely stopped: they are eaten with linseed-oil, or butter, and generally with a little lime-juice".

Fūl is prepared from the small, round bean known in Egypt as fūl medames ("brown beans"). The beans are cooked until very soft. Other kinds of beans used by Egyptian cooks are fūl rūmī ("Roman", i.e. "European broad beans"), large kidney-shaped fava beans, and fūl baladī ("country beans", which are of middling size). Fūl nābit (Coptic: ⲫⲉⲗⲉⲧⲣⲏⲧ, Feletrat) are fava bean sprouts, fūl akhḍar ("green fūl") are fresh fava beans, and fūl madshūsh ("crushed fūl") are crushed fava beans.

== Other countries ==
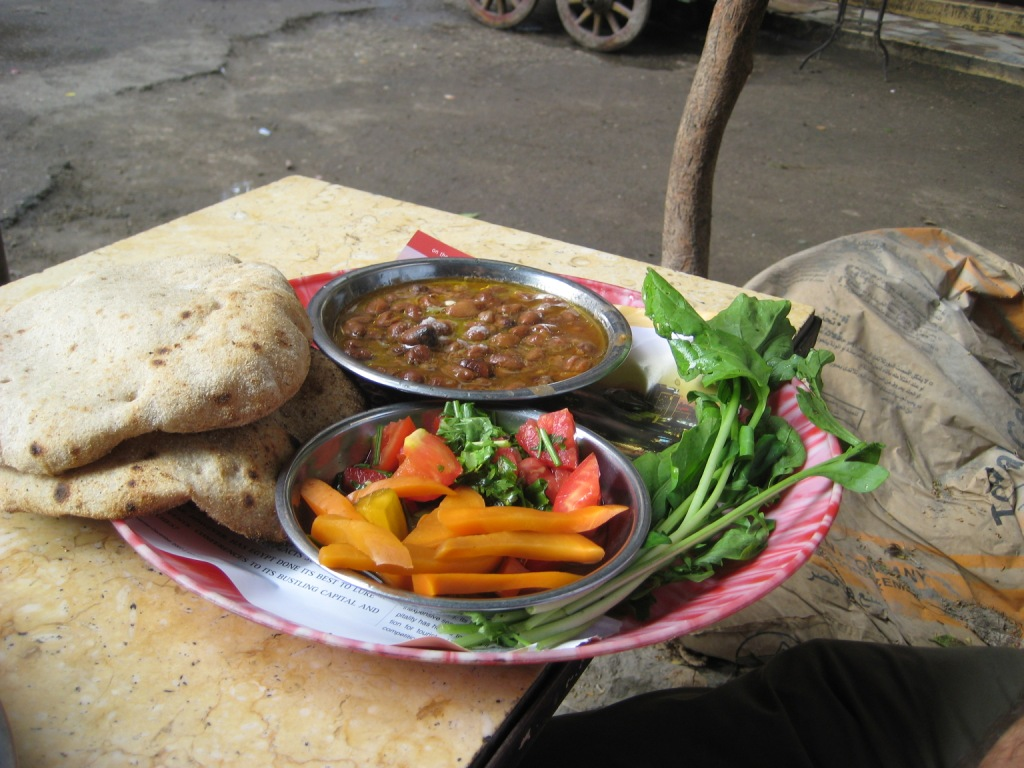
Typical fūl medames breakfast as served by an Egyptian street vendor with bread and pickled vegetables, as well as fresh rocket (arugula) leaves on the side.

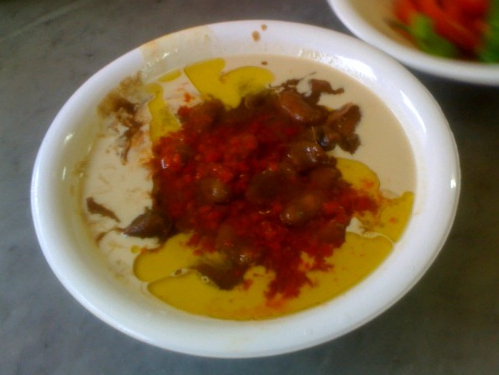
Aleppo-style ful with tahini and olive oil, topped with Aleppo pepper sauce

Ful medames was exported from Egypt to other parts of the Arab world, as well as other parts of Africa and Asia, but particularly to Iraq, Lebanon, Syria, Jordan, Israel, Palestine, Saudi Arabia, Yemen, Bahrain, Somalia, Djibouti, Ethiopia, Eritrea, South Sudan, Sudan, Morocco and Libya.

=== Middle East ===
Ful medames is a popular breakfast dish in Syria, especially Aleppo. The fava beans are left simmering in large copper jars throughout the night, to be served from the next morning on; the beans swim in tahini and olive oil, completed with a hint of red pepper paste (made from Aleppo pepper) over the top.

In Jordan, ful is made just like hummus in a form of a dip, usually made with tahini, garlic, tomato, lemon juice, ground cumin, olive oil, green peppers and salt.

In Jerusalem and Occupied Palestine, ful is often served on top of hummus, such a setup is sometimes referred to as Qudsiyeh (Arabic: قدسية, lit. 'From Jerusalem') outside of Jerusalem.

Ful medames is consumed as part of the Lent diet by Christian communities in Arab countries.

=== Africa ===
In Somalia, fuul is a staple in breakfast food. It is often served with eggs, khubz or ceesh bread or the traditional Somali flatbread called laxoox/canjeero. It is very similar to the Egyptian, Sudanese, and Saudi variants of the dish, but usually spicier due to Somalis' use of the xawaash spice mixture (cumin, coriander, sage, peppercorn, fenugreek, turmeric, ginger, cardamom, cloves, nutmeg, and saffron).

In Morocco ful is known as bissara and consists of fava beans and split green peas (known locally as jabbana) boiled together with garlic and served with cumin and seasoning. It is particularly popular in the north of the country and is eaten during the cold winter months.

In Ethiopia and Eritrea, ful is one of the few dishes not eaten with a pancake-like bread called injera but is served with wheat flour bread. Places serving ful and the accompanying flour bread often provide a communal kitchen for patrons seeking to bake such types of breads since flour bread is not typical in the Ethiopian or Eritrean diet. The beans are topped, or mixed with, a combination of oil and berbere.

=== Other regions ===
In Malta, ful bit-tewm (beans with garlic) is usually associated with fasting during Lent and Good Friday. The beans are soaked in water overnight, cooked in oil with garlic and fresh or dried mint, then dressed with olive oil or vinegar before serving.

The meal has also travelled as far as Malaysia, in particular the state of Johore, and Singapore where it has been adapted into the local recipe kacang pool, which incorporates ghee in place of oil and minced meat. Kidney beans and baked beans are also added to give the dish more body. The words kacang and pool both mean "beans" respectively in Malay and Arabic, rendering it tautological.

== Salad ==
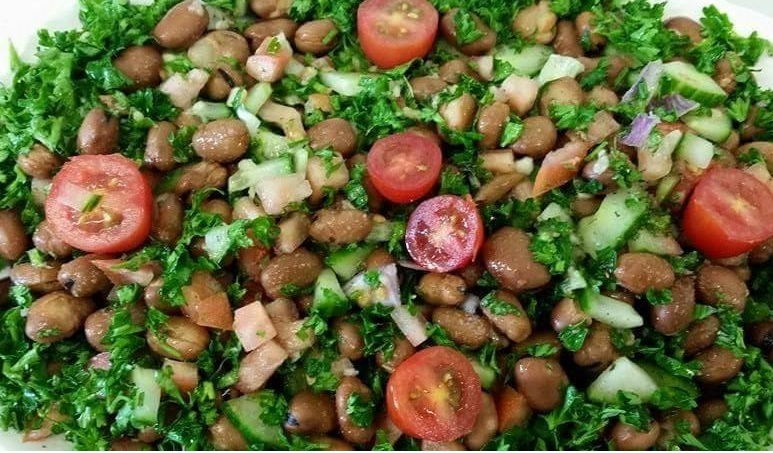
Ful medames salad

Ful medames salad (Arabic: سلطة فول مدمس) is an Arab breakfast mezze favorite, but it is also eaten as a hearty salad. It typically consists of fava beans, chopped tomatoes, onion, parsley, lemon juice, olive oil, pepper and salt.

== Similar dishes ==
Adas Medames (Arabic: عدس مدمس) is a dish prepared in the same way as ful medames, but using lentils in place of fava beans, it can be found in Egypt as well as other countries like Palestine.

== See also ==
- Egyptian cuisine
- List of African dishes
- List of bean dishes
- List of Ethiopian dishes and foods
- List of Middle Eastern dishes
