= Kitcha =

Unleavened bread in Ethiopian and Eritrean culinary tradition

Kitta
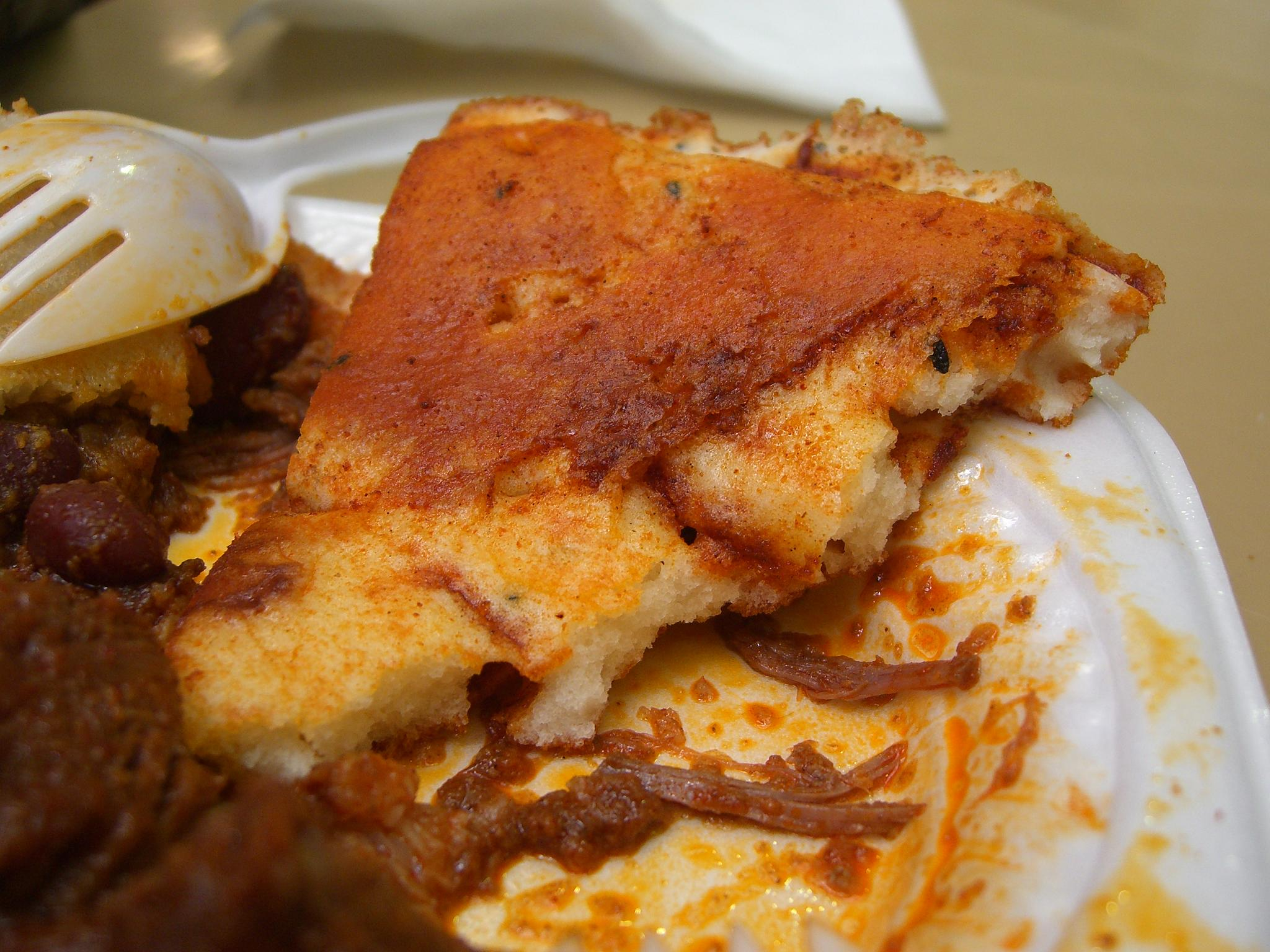
- Type: Flatbread
- Place of origin: Eritrea, Ethiopia
- Main ingredients: Flour, water, salt

Kitta (Tigrinya: ቅጫ, kitta Amharic: ቂጣ) (Oromo: Maxinoo) is a relatively thin unleavened bread typical of Ethiopian and Eritrean cuisine. It is generally made with wheat flour, water, and salt. It is cooked in a hot pan free-form until one side is cooked. It is then picked up and cooked on the other side. Slight burning on each side is often seen.

Kitcha will take the shape of the pan in which it is cooked (much like a pancake, though it bears no relation). It is most frequently eaten in a dish called kitcha fit-fit.

== See also ==
- List of African dishes
- List of breads
