= Niter kibbeh =

Seasoned clarified butter used in Ethiopian and Eritrean cuisine

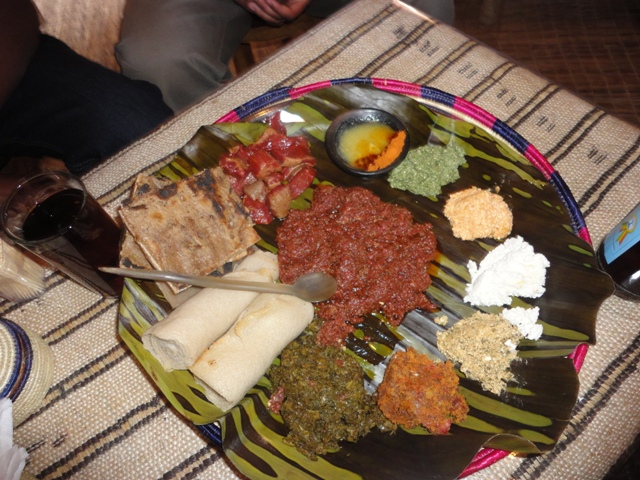
- Kitfo is a minced raw beef dish that incorporates niter kibbeh and a spice blend (mitmita).
- Alternative names: Niter qibe
- Type: Seasoned, clarified butter
- Place of origin: Eritrea and Ethiopia
- Region or state: East Africa
- Main ingredients: Butter
- Ingredients generally used: Spices

Niter kibbeh, or niter qibe (Amharic: ንጥር ቅቤ, romanized: nət'ər qəbe), also called tesmi (in Tigrinya), is a seasoned, clarified butter used in Ethiopian and Eritrean cuisine and of Indian origin. Its preparation is similar to that of ghee, but niter kibbeh is simmered with spices such as besobela (known as Ethiopian sacred basil), koseret, fenugreek, cumin, coriander, turmeric, Ethiopian cardamom (korarima), cinnamon, or nutmeg before straining, imparting a distinct, spicy aroma. The version using vegetable oil instead of butter is called yeqimem zeyet.

== See also ==
- List of Ethiopian dishes and foods
