= Berbere =

Ethiopian spice mixture

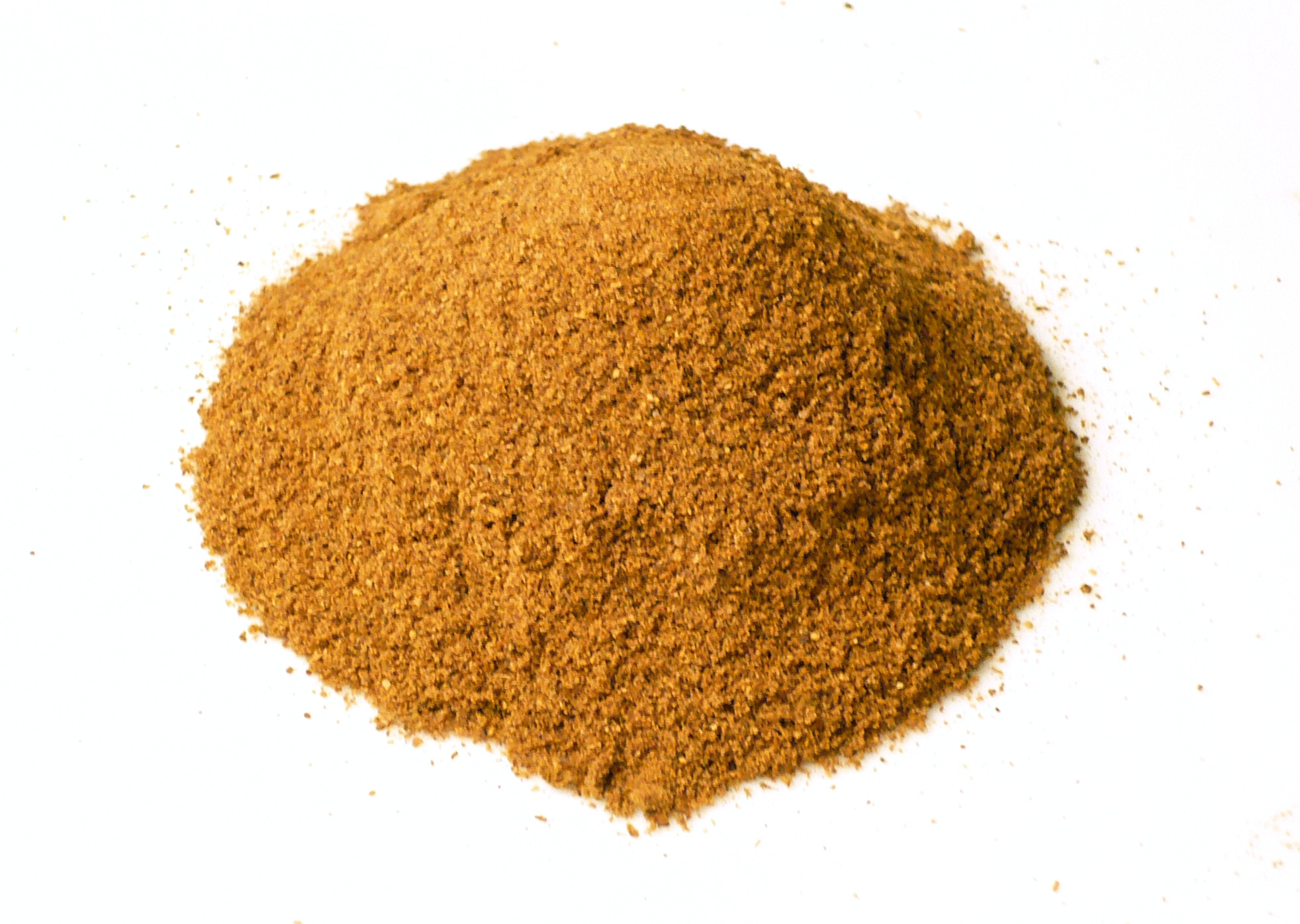
A pile of berbere

Berbere (Amharic: በርበሬ bärbäre, Tigrinya: በርበረ bärbärä) is a spice mixture whose constituent elements usually include chili peppers, coriander, garlic, ginger, Ethiopian holy basil (besobela) seeds, korarima, rue, ajwain or radhuni, nigella, and fenugreek. It is a key ingredient in the cuisines of Ethiopia and Eritrea. Berbere also refers to chili pepper itself.

Berbere sometimes encompasses herbs and spices that are less well known internationally. These include both cultivated plants and those that grow wild in Ethiopia, such as korarima (Aframomum corrorima).

== See also ==
- Mitmita, another Ethiopian spice mixture
- Awaze, Ethiopian spice paste
- Piri piri
- List of Ethiopian dishes and foods
