= Christian dietary laws =

Christian principles for daily food

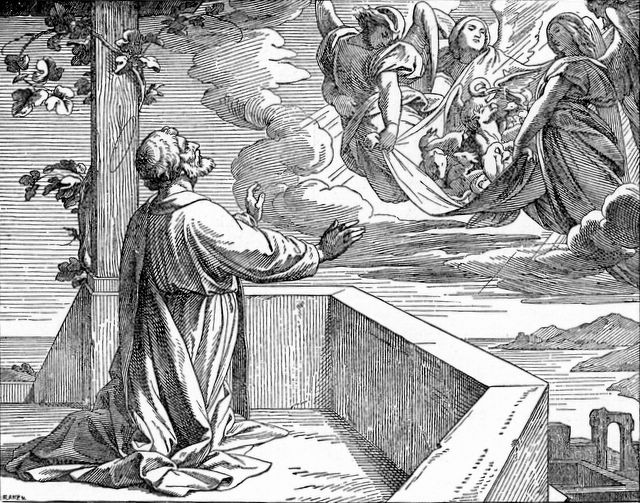
Peter's vision of a sheet with animals, described in Acts 10; illustration from Henry Davenport Northrop's Treasures of the Bible, published 1894.

Christian dietary laws vary between denominations. The general dietary restrictions specified for Christians in the New Testament are to "abstain from food sacrificed to idols, from blood, from meat of strangled animals". The early Christian Didache specifies that Christians should "not eat meat sacrificed to idols." Some Christian denominations forbid certain foods during periods of fasting, which in some cases may cover half the year and may exclude meat, fish, dairy products, and olive oil.

Christians in the Catholic, Lutheran, Anglican, and Orthodox denominations, among others, traditionally observe Friday as a meat-free day (in mourning of the crucifixion of Jesus); many also fast and abstain from consuming meat on Wednesday (in memory of the betrayal of Jesus). There are various fasting periods, most notably the liturgical season of Lent. A number of Christian denominations forbid alcohol consumption, and all Christian churches condemn drunkenness as being a sin.

== In the New Testament ==
The only dietary restrictions specified for Christians in the New Testament are to "abstain from food sacrificed to idols, from blood, from meat of strangled animals" (Acts 15:29), teachings that the early Church Fathers, such as Clement of Alexandria and Origen, preached for believers to follow. Paul the Apostle told the Christians in Corinth not to worry about eating food sacrificed to idols, since "an idol has no real existence" (1 Corinthians 8:4). However, while liberating the Christian from this common dietary restriction, he did recommend using discernment, because it would be better to never eat any meat than to cause another Christian to stumble (1 Corinthians 8:4–13).

== Early Christianity ==
The Council of Jerusalem instructed gentile Christians not to consume blood, food offered to idols, or the meat of strangled animals, since "the Law of Moses has been preached in every city from the earliest times and is read in the synagogues on every Sabbath." In Judaism, Jews are forbidden from consuming (amongst other things) any mammals except those with cloven hooves that chew their cud, shellfish (including all invertebrate seafood) and unscaled or finless fish, blood, food offered to idols, or the meat of animals not killed humanely with a sharp knife by a trained Jewish slaughterer or meat from a living animal. The Seven Laws of Noah, which Jews believe all people, both Jews and gentiles alike must follow, also forbid consuming the meat of living animals.

== Denominational views ==
=== Chalcedonian Christianity ===
In Chalcedonian Christianity, including Catholicism, Eastern Orthodoxy, Lutheranism, Moravianism, Anglicanism, and Reformed Christianity, there exist no dietary restrictions regarding specific animals that cannot be eaten. This stems from Peter the Apostle's vision of a sheet with animals, described in the Bible, in Acts of the Apostles, Chapter 10, when Saint Peter was told that "what God hath made clean, that call not thou common".

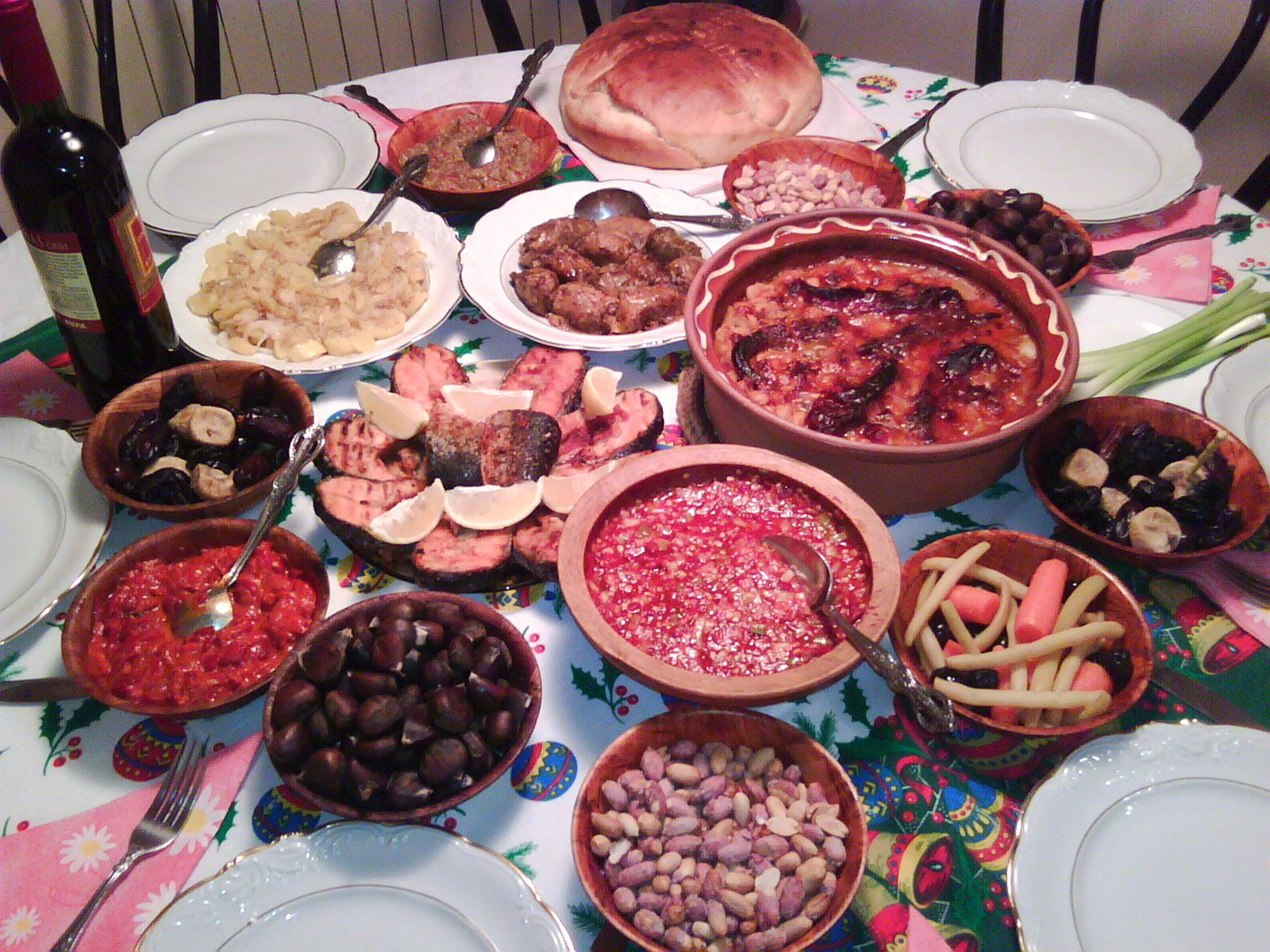
An Orthodox Christmas Eve (Badnik) Dinner in North Macedonia: fish, beans, paprika salads, sarma, dates, figs, chestnuts and the bread loaf.

The Seventh-day Adventist Church follows the Old Testament's Mosaic Law on dietary restrictions, which is also the basis for the Jewish dietary laws. They only eat meat of a herbivore with split hooves and birds without a crop and without webbed feet; they also do not eat shellfish of any kind, and they only eat fish with scales. Any other animal is considered unclean and not suitable for eating. All vegetables, fruits and nuts are allowed.

=== Oriental Orthodoxy ===
In the Ethiopian Orthodox Church, an Oriental Orthodox Christian denomination, washing one's hands is required before and after consuming food. This is followed by prayer, in which Christians often pray to God to thank Him for and bless their food before consuming it at the time of eating meals. Slaughtering animals for food is often done in Ethiopia with the trinitarian formula.

The Armenian Apostolic Church, as with other Oriental Orthodox Churches, have rituals that "display obvious links with shechitah, Jewish kosher slaughter." The Ethiopian Orthodox Church and Eritrean Orthodox Church maintain dietary restrictions on a traditional basis.

== Meat ==
=== Method of slaughter ===
With reference to medieval times, Jillian Williams states that "unlike the Jewish and Muslims methods of animal slaughter, which require the draining of the animal's blood, Christian slaughter practices did not usually specify the method of slaughter" though "the Christian method of preparation largely mirrored the slaughter methods of Jews and Muslims for large animals". "The Christian methods of slaughter follow the Jewish way of draining the blood of the animal". David Grumett and Rachel Muers state that the Orthodox Christian Shechitah and Jewish Kosher methods of slaughter differ from the Muslim Halal (Dhabh) method in that they require the cut to "sever the trachea, oesophagus and the jugular veins of the animal" as this method is believed to cause minimal suffering to the animal.

== Jhatka and Christianity ==
According to Sikhism, Jhatka meat is meat from an animal that has been killed by a single strike of a sword or axe to sever the head, as opposed to ritualistically slow slaughter (kutha) like the Jewish slaughter (shechita) or Islamic slaughter (dhabihah). It is the method preferred by many Hindus, Sikhs, and Christians.

The jhatka method of slaughtering animals for food (with a single strike to the head to minimize pain) is preferred by many Christians, although the Armenian Apostolic Church, among other Orthodox Christians, have rituals that "display obvious links with shechitah, Jewish kosher slaughter."

== Vegetarianism ==
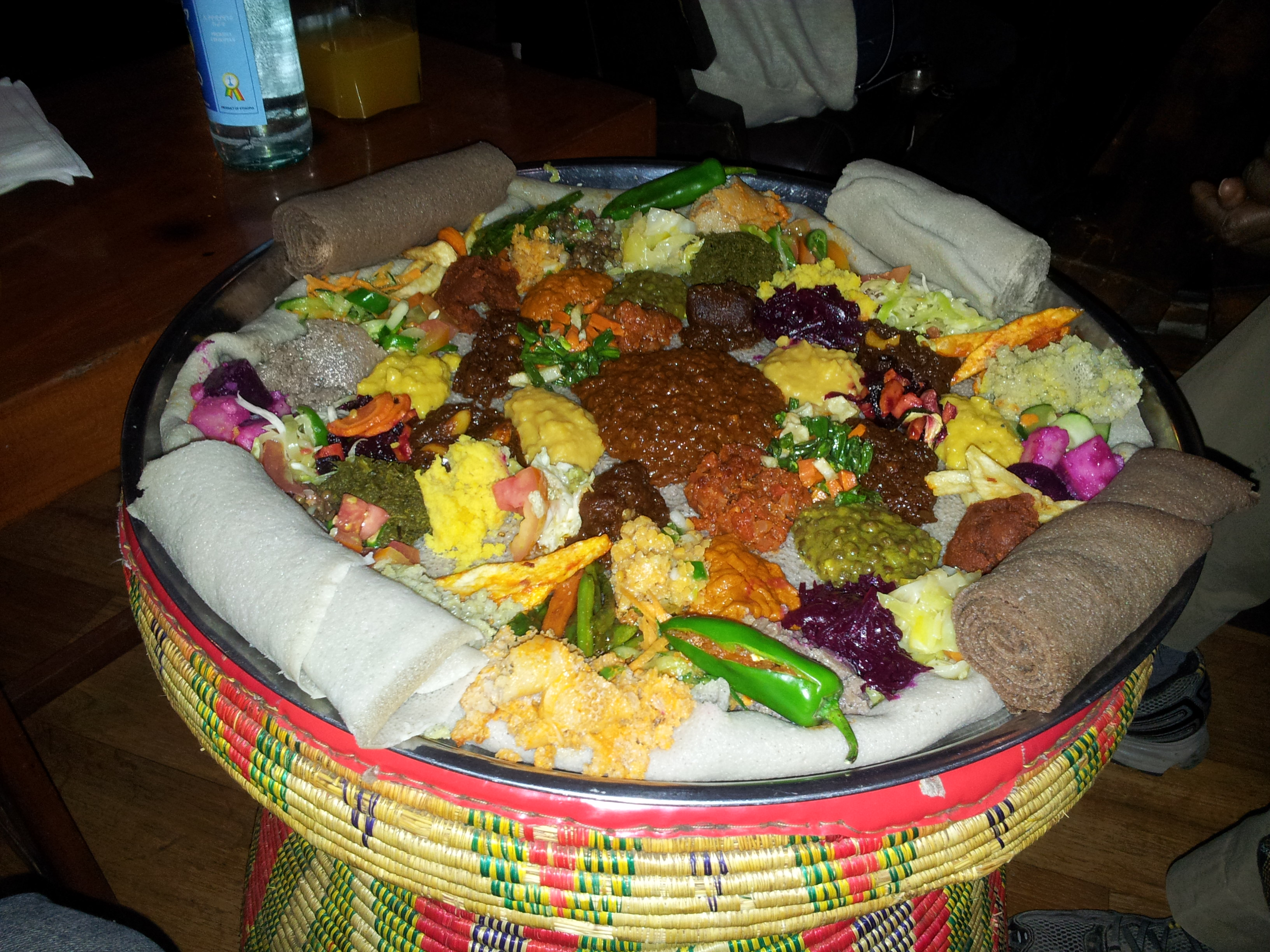
A vegan Ethiopian Yetsom beyaynetu, compatible with fasting rules.

Some Christian monks, such as the Trappists, have adopted a vegetarian policy of abstinence from eating meat. During Lent some Christian communities, such as Orthodox Christians in the Middle East, undertake partial fasting eating only one light meal per day. For strict Greek Orthodox Christians and Coptic Orthodox Christians, all meals during this 40-day period are prepared without animal products and are essentially vegan. Abstaining from animal products during Lent occurs by many Christians for this period, though some believers practice Christian vegetarianism as a way of life.

In Western Christianity, fasting is observed during the forty-day season of Lent by many communicants of the Catholic Church, Lutheran Churches, Anglican Communion, Methodist Churches and the Western Orthodox Churches to commemorate the fast observed by Christ during his temptation in the desert. While some Western Christians fast during the entire season of Lent, Ash Wednesday and Good Friday are emphasized by Western certain Christian denominations as especially important days of fasting within the Lenten season. In many Western Christian Churches, including those of the Catholic, Methodist and Baptist traditions, certain congregations have committed to undertaking the Daniel Fast during the whole season of Lent, in which believers practice abstinence from meat, lacticinia and alcohol for the entire forty days of the liturgical season.

According to Canon Law, Roman Catholics are required to abstain from meat (defined as all animal flesh and organs, excluding water animals) on Ash Wednesday and all Fridays of Lent including Good Friday. Ash Wednesday and Good Friday are also fast days for Catholics ages 18 to 60, in which one main meal and two half-meals are eaten, with no snacking. Canon Law also obliges Catholics to abstain from meat on the Fridays of the year outside of Lent (excluding certain holy days) unless, with the permission of the local conference of bishops, another penitential act is substituted. Exceptions are allowed for health and necessity like manual labor and not causing offense when being a guest. The restrictions on eating meat on these days is solely as an act of penance and not because of a religious objection to eating meat.

== Alcohol ==
Most Christian denominations condone moderate consumption of alcohol and beverages, including the Anglicans, Catholics, Presbyterians, Lutherans, Reformed and the Orthodox. The Adventist, Baptist, Methodist, Latter-day Saints, and Pentecostal traditions tend to either encourage abstinence from or prohibit the consumption of alcohol (cf. teetotalism). In any case, all Christian churches, following various Biblical passages, condemn drunkenness as sinful (cf. Galatians 5:19–21).

== See also ==
- Ablution in Christianity
- Christian diet programs
- Christmas dinner
- Easter food
- Fasting in Christianity
- Fixed prayer times
- Hygiene in Christianity
- Ital food in Rastafari
- Seventh-day Adventist Church § Health and diet
- Word of Wisdom
