= Christian vegetarianism =

Vegetarianism based on Christian religious views

Christian vegetarianism is the practice of keeping to a vegetarian lifestyle for reasons connected to or derived from the Christian faith. The three primary reasons are spiritual, nutritional, and ethical. The ethical reasons may include a concern for God's creation, a concern for animal rights and welfare, or both. Likewise, Christian veganism is not using any animal products for reasons connected to or derived from the Christian faith. Pescetarianism was widespread in the early Church, among both the clergy and laity. Among the early Christian Gnostics the Ebionites held that John the Baptist, James the Just and Jesus were vegetarians.

Some religious orders of various Christian Churches practice pescetarianism, including the Benedictines, Franciscans, Trappists, Carthusians and Cistercians. Various Church leaders have recommended vegetarianism, including John Wesley (founder of the Methodist Church), William and Catherine Booth (founders of The Salvation Army), William Cowherd from the Bible Christian Church and Ellen G. White from the Seventh-day Adventists. Cowherd, who founded the Bible Christian Church in 1809, helped to establish the world's first Vegetarian Society in 1847. Organizations such as the Christian Vegetarian Association (CVA) work to promote the concept.

Additionally, many Christians may choose to practice vegetarianism or veganism as their Lenten sacrifice during the period of Lent. Prior to the 6th century, Lent was normatively observed through keeping the Black Fast for forty days, with the allowance of one vegetarian meal with water after sunset.

== Biblical support ==
Christian vegetarianism has not been a common dietary choice throughout Church history. Nevertheless, "there is a long-standing tradition of vegetarianism in Christian history." The two most prominent forms are a spirituality-based vegetarianism (where vegetarianism is adopted as an ascetic practice, or as a way of opposing the sin of gluttony, in the hope it will draw the person to God) and an ethically based vegetarianism (where it is adopted for ethical reasons; for example, those to do with the treatment of non-human animals).

=== Old Testament ===
One of the most important passages for Christian vegetarians is the creation narrative in the Book of Genesis. After creating humans, God addresses them in chapter 1, verses 1:29–30 as follows:

God said, "See, I have given you every plant yielding seed that is upon the face of all the earth, and every tree with seed in its fruit; you shall have them for food. And to every beast of the earth, and to every bird of the air, and to everything that creeps on the earth, everything that has the breath of life, I have given every green plant for food". And it was so.

In this passage, God prescribes a plant-based diet not just for humans, but for all land-based non-human animals. Christian vegetarians and vegans point out that it was this creation – where all creatures ate plants – that God then declared "very good" in verse 31. Moreover, that God's initial creation was a vegan creation suggests that this is how God intended all his creatures to live. This idea – that God intended for all his creatures to eat plants – is sometimes further supported by noting that the vision of the Peaceable Kingdom found in the Book of Isaiah 11:6–9 suggests that, one day, God will restore the creation to such a state of universal vegetarianism:

The wolf shall live with the lamb, the leopard shall lie down with the kid, the calf and the lion and the fatling together, and a little child shall lead them. The cow and the bear shall graze, their young shall lie down together; and the lion shall eat straw like the ox. The nursing child shall play over the hole of the asp, and the weaned child shall put its hand on the adder's den. They will not hurt or destroy on all my holy mountain; for the earth will be full of the knowledge of the Lord as the waters cover the sea.

Some Christian vegetarians have suggested that this eschatological view provides reasons to adopt a vegetarian or vegan diet here and now. Moreover, the point has often been made that the dominion which humans are given over the non-human animals in Genesis 1:26–28 must be understood in light of Genesis 1:29–30 which decrees a plant-based diet for all creatures. Genesis 1:26–28 has, it is acknowledged by Christian vegetarians, often been used to justify the eating of animals. But this is a mistake, they suggest. Once it is recognized that humans are given dominion over creation, and that in the very next verse humans are prescribed a plant-based diet, it will become apparent that dominion should be understood in terms of stewardship or servant-hood: humans are called to rule creation in the sense of caring for it and seeking its flourishing, just as a good Sovereign would seek the flourishing of his or her realm. In a survey of the scholarly literature on the relevant Hebrew terms, Carol J. Adams lists governing, ruling, shepherding, caring-for, nurturing, and leading about as potential ways of understanding dominion, and notes that the common characteristic of these concepts "is their benignity".

The opening chapters of Genesis are, of course, only the beginning of the biblical story. And just as there are passages which can be cited in support of a Christian vegetarianism or veganism, so there are passages which suggest that eating animals is morally permissible. The most problematic passages for Christian vegetarians are those which include an explicit permission to eat animals. Genesis 9:3–4 is the first such example. In this verse, God tells Noah and his family that animals will now be their food, although they are not to eat animal flesh which contains blood.^{[Genesis 9:3–4]} However, the context of the passage remains contentious to the morality of eating Animals. "I will never again curse the ground because of humankind, for the inclination of the human heart is evil from youth; nor will I ever again destroy every living creature as I have done." Indicating that God has deemed Humanity 'evil from youth' and perhaps within the context of this understanding, says he will not smite them for doing evil, potentially such as eating meat. Similarly "The fear and dread of you shall rest on every animal of the earth, and on every bird of the air, on everything that creeps on the ground, and on all the fish of the sea; into your hand they are delivered" seems to emphasise the immorality and evil of the act. This new situation – that of humans eating animals – is then taken largely for granted in much of the biblical narrative. Leviticus 11 records God giving the Israelites rules about what types of meat may be eaten, which implies that certain meats were acceptable. During the Exodus out of Egypt, God commanded that all of the Israelites slaughter a lamb and eat it, and instituted the Passover as a lasting tradition to remember God's saving them.^{[Exodus 12:24]}

Some Jewish and Christian vegetarians have attempted to minimize the importance of these passages. It has been suggested, for example, that God's permitting Noah and his family to eat meat was only ever intended as a temporary permission, and was given because all the plants had been destroyed as a result of the flood. Others interpret the permission given to Noah and his family in Genesis 9:3–4, not as a free pass to kill animals for food because "no matter what you do you can never remove all the blood from the flesh of a slaughtered animal", but as an invitation to scavenge for and eat dead animals if any are found. These approaches are put under pressure, however, with the sheer number of passages which appear to presuppose the legitimacy of eating animals, and the normalcy with which meat eating is treated.

Another approach to these texts is to suggest that God reluctantly permitted the eating of animals due to human sinfulness. In other words, God permitted humans to eat non-human animals as a concession to the Fallen state of humanity. Richard Young raises the possibility that both the introduction of animals into the human diet, and the use of animals in religious sacrifices, were concessions to a Fallen humanity that were used to deal with humanity where it was at. This approach allows the Christian vegetarian or vegan to take the entire biblical witness seriously, while also holding that God's preference is for a peace and shalom throughout creation. Other passages of relevance to the practice of vegetarianism include Numbers 11, where the Israelites tired of manna, a food of which "The Rabbis of the Talmud held that [...] had whatever taste and flavor the eater desired at the time of eating" and which probably was not an animal product. Manna was given to the Israelites by God, but they complained about it and wanted meat instead.^{[Numbers 11:4–10]} They were condemned for this, although God relented and gave them meat, which then made them ill.^{[Numbers 11:32–34]} Because of their lust, the place where the incident happened became known as Kibroth Hattaavah.

A donkey temporarily given the ability to speak showed Balaam more than signs of sentience.^{[Numbers 22:21–33]} Some people believe that the Book of Daniel also specifically promotes veganism as empowering. Daniel specifically refuses the king's "meat" (paṯbaḡ, Strong's #5698) and instead requests vegetables (zērōʿîm, Strong's #2235).^{[Daniel 1:8–16]} However, current common theology argues that in this instance Daniel, Hananiah, Mishael and Azariah are rejecting food that is considered to be unholy by their faith (eating food that had been sacrificed to pagan gods), and not meat per se, despite that "at the end of ten days their countenances appeared fairer and fatter in flesh than all the children which did eat the portion of the king's meat".^{[Daniel 1:15]}

Philo says that the Essenes, "being more scrupulous than any in the worship of God ... do not sacrifice animals ..., but hold it right to dedicate their own hearts as a worthy offering". They maintained that the sacrifices "polluted" the Temple. The Christian Vegetarian Association of the UK claims that the word "meat" is not used in any one instance in the authorized version of either the Old or New Testament as relating only to animal food (e.g. "flesh"). The CVA states that when the first English translations of the Bible were created, the word for "meat" meant food in general. When any particular kind of food was designated, it was referred to as meal, flour or grain.

According to the CVA, examples of New Testament words that were translated as "meat" include: broma ("that which is eaten"/usage: 16 times); brosimos ("eatable"/usage: 1 time); brosis ("act of eating; that which is eaten, food; food of the souls"/usage: 7 times); prosphagion ("anything eaten with bread; spoken of fish boiled or broiled"/usage: 1 time); sitometron ("a measured portion of grain or food"/usage: 1 time); trapeza ("a table on which food is placed, an eating place"/usage: 1 time); trophe ("food, nourishment"/usage: 13 times); phago ("to eat, to take food, eat a meal, devour, consume"/usage: 3 times).

=== New Testament ===
==== The case for Christian vegetarianism ====
Christian vegetarians and vegans often appeal to the ethic that Jesus embodied, and called people to emulate, in making their case for a distinctively Christian vegetarianism. To begin with, Jesus inaugurated the Kingdom of God, but his Kingdom did not involve the exercise of power as humans tend to think of it.

Christian vegetarians also stress the importance Jesus laid on peace and inclusion. These and other aspects of Jesus's attitudes towards others are used to extract ethical principles which, according to Christian vegetarians and vegans, lead one to a vegetarian or vegan lifestyle. Sarah Withrow King summarizes the point like this:

Aware of the suffering and pain experienced by animals raised and killed for food, with a knowledge of the immense waste of natural resources and subsequent impact on both our fellow humans and the rest of creation, and acknowledging that flesh is not a dietary necessity for the vast majority of Western humans, why would we continue to participate in a system that dishonors God's creation and perpetuates violence on a truly phenomenal scale?

==== Difficult passages ====
===== Luke 24 – Jesus's eating of a fish =====
Jesus's eating of fish^{[Luke 24]} and telling his disciples where to catch fish, before cooking it for them to eat,^{[John 21]} is a common subject in Christian ethical vegetarian and vegan writings. The original version does not mention fish at all and only bread. The Bible does not explicitly state that Jesus ate any meat, and Webb cites the fact that no lamb is mentioned at the Last Supper as evidence that he did not. According to Clough and King, the fact that Jesus ate fish and possibly other meat only shows that, in some circumstances, it is sometimes permissible to eat some meats but that practices in the modern, industrialized farming system (such as the mass killing of day-old male chicks from laying hens) make the consumption of meat produced in such farms morally problematic.

Andy Alexis-Baker has appealed to biblical scholarship to argue that biblical passages often need nuanced interpretation, and to guard against a wooden literalism. For example, he cites the work of Gerald O'Collins, SJ, who suggests that differences between the way Luke describes this appearance in Luke 24:41–43 and in Acts 1, and a tension between Luke 24:41–43 and 1 Corinthians 6, preclude us from reading this verse literally. Vujicic explains this passage by appealing to a so-called synoptic principle.

Jesus celebrated the Passover meal with his disciples. This Passover mean contained the meat of a sheep (Exodus 12:8-10).

===== Acts 10 – Peter's vision =====
In the tenth chapter of the Acts of the Apostles, there is an account of a vision given to the Apostle Peter. In this vision, Peter is shown a large sheet being lowered from heaven by its four corners. The sheet is said to contain animals of all kinds, and Peter then hears a voice (which he interprets as a command from God) saying, "Get up, Peter; kill and eat".^{[Acts 10:13]} Peter refuses, and the voice says: "What God has made clean, you must not call profane."^{Acts 10:13]}

Christian vegetarians and vegans argue that this passage is not about which animals one may or may not eat but it is about who the Gospel is for. According to Laura Hobgood-Oster, "The vision, it seems, is not about eating animals; rather it is about extending hospitality to all humans. While animals in sacred texts are often real animals and should be considered as such, in this particular case it seems that in Peter's vision animals symbolized human categories that exclude other humans from community."

Sarah Withrow King writes that God uses this vision to remind Peter that he is to "remove barriers of fellowship and to reconcile with those from whom we have been separated in order to further the reign of God on earth.... the vision is one of radical inclusion." John Vujicic agrees with King, observing that, after receiving the vision, Peter did not eat anything. Vujicic writes, "In the sheet were also so called CLEAN animals. Peter could have at least selected some sheep or cattle and killed but he didn't." According to Vujicic, the reason Peter did not simply take up and eat a clean animal was because Peter was in fact a vegetarian. Peter is reported as describing himself as a vegetarian in the apocryphal Pseudo-Clementine Homilies.

===== Mark 7 – Jesus declares all foods clean =====
Most Christians maintain that Jesus's teaching in Mark 7^{[Mark 7:5–21]} demonstrates that Christians can eat whatever they want, that dietary choices are a matter of "Christian liberty", and that therefore vegetarianism or veganism could never be obligatory for Christians. Christian vegetarians and vegans counter that the point of Jesus's teaching in Mark 7 is that his followers should concern themselves with the status of their heart which "informs our relationship with God, with each other, and the world".

== Early Christianity ==
=== New Testament ===
Vegetarianism appears to have been a point of contention within some early Christian circles, notably in Rome. Within the Bible's New Testament, the Apostle Paul states that people of "weak faith" "eat only vegetables",^{[Romans 14:1–4]} although he also warns both meat-eaters and vegetarians to "stop passing judgment on one another" when it comes to food in verse 13 and "[It is] good neither to eat flesh" in verse 21. Paul also said, "The Spirit clearly says that in later times some will abandon the faith and follow deceiving spirits and things taught by demons. Such teachings come through hypocritical liars, whose consciences have been seared as with a hot iron. They [...] order [...] to abstain from certain foods".^{[1Timothy 4:1–3]} According to the Christian Vegetarian Association, Paul was not referring to vegetarianism, which they say was not an issue in those times, but to the practice of not eating meat from the meat market because of fear that (like the above issue involving Daniel) it was sacrificed to an idol.^{[1Corinthians 10:19–29]} "Wherefore, if meat [brōma, Strong's #1033, 'anything used as food'] make my brother to offend, I will eat no flesh while the world standeth, lest I make my brother to offend."^{1Corinthians 8:13}

=== Patristic evidence ===
In the fourth century some Jewish Christian groups maintained that Jesus was himself a vegetarian. Epiphanius quotes the Gospel of the Ebionites where Jesus has a confrontation with the high priest. Jesus chastises the leadership saying, "I am come to end the sacrifices and feasts of blood; and if ye cease not offering and eating of flesh and blood, the wrath of God shall not cease from you; even as it came to your fathers in the wilderness, who lusted for flesh, and did sate to their content, and were filled with rottenness, and the plague consumed them."

According to Lightfoot, "the Christianized Essennes [...] condemned the slaughter of victims on grounds very different from those alleged in the Epistle of Hebrews, not because they have been superseded by the Atonement, but because they are in their very nature repulsive to God; not because they have ceased to be right, but because they never were right from the beginning".

Other early Christian historical documents observe that many influential Christians during the formative centuries of Christianity were vegetarian, though certainly not all. The Didascalia does not itself endorse vegetarianism, it records a group of individuals who believe they "should not eat flesh, and said that a man must not eat anything that has a soul in it."

Although early Christian vegetarianism appears to have been downplayed in favor of more "modern" Christian culture, the practice of vegetarianism appears to have been very widespread in early Christianity, both in the leadership and among the laity. Origen's work Contra Celsum quotes Celsus commenting vegetarian practices among Christians he had contact with. Although not vegetarian himself and vehemently against the idea that Christians must be vegetarians, Augustine nevertheless wrote that those Christians who "abstain both from flesh and from wine" are "without number".

== Churches and movements ==
=== Historical developments ===
Followers of the Gnostic sect known as Catharism practiced pescatarianism as early as the Middle Ages. The Bible Christian Church founded by Reverend William Cowherd in 1809 followed a vegetarian diet. Cowherd was one of the philosophical forerunners of the Vegetarian Society. Cowherd encouraged members to abstain from eating of meat as a form of temperance. Cowherd emphasized that vegetarianism was good for health, whilst eating meat was unnatural and likely to cause aggression. Later he is reputed to have said "If God had meant us to eat meat, then it would have come to us in edible form [as is the ripened fruit]."

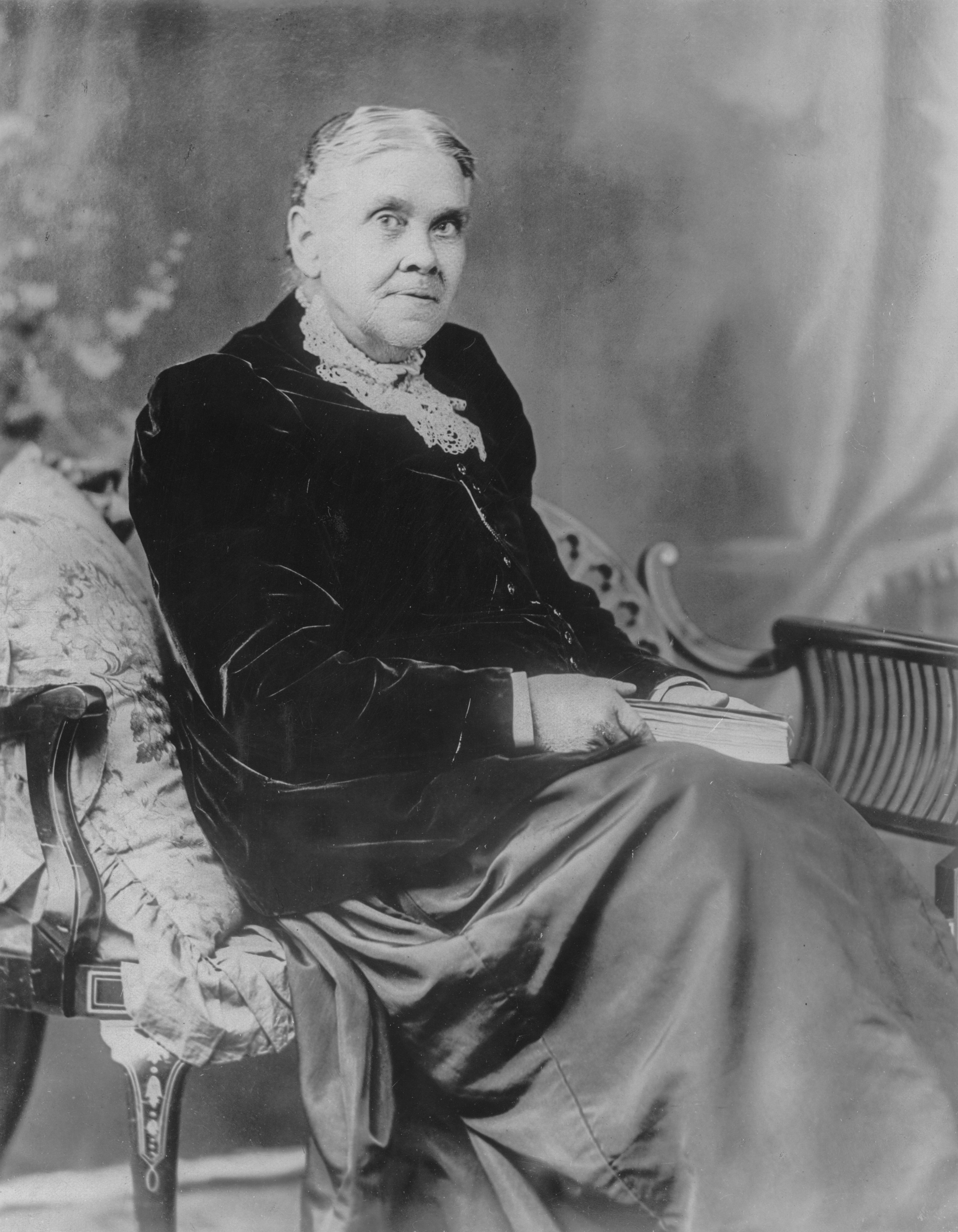
Ellen G. White, vegetarian and co-founder of the Seventh-day Adventist Church

The Seventh-day Adventists present a health message that recommends vegetarianism and expects abstinence from pork, shellfish and other foods proscribed as "unclean" in Leviticus. A number of the founders of the Seventh-day Adventist Church, including Joseph Bates and Ellen White, adopted a vegetarian diet during the nineteenth century, and Ellen White reportedly received visions regarding the health benefits of a vegetarian diet. More recently, members of the Seventh-day Adventist Church in California have been involved in research into longevity due to their healthy lifestyle, which includes maintaining a vegetarian diet. This research has been included within a National Geographic article. Another denomination with common origin, the Seventh Day Adventist Reform Movement recommends vegetarianism as a part of fellowship, with many of its members being practicing vegans as well. Typically, however, these sabbatarian pro-vegetarian Christian fellowships do not "require vegetarianism as a test of fellowship."

The Word of Wisdom is a dietary law given to adherents of the Latter Day Saint movement (also known as Mormonism), which states that "flesh also of beasts and of fowls of the air... are to be used sparingly," and that "it is pleasing unto [God] that they should not be used, only in times of winter, or of cold, or famine". Unlike injunctions against tobacco and alcohol, compliance with this part of the Doctrine and Covenants has never been made mandatory by the Church of Jesus Christ of Latter-day Saints (LDS Church), the largest Latter Day Saint denomination. Many LDS Church leaders have expressed their views on the subject of meat, but since Joseph F. Smith became church president in 1901, emphasis on refraining from meat has largely been dropped. An official church publication states, "[m]odern methods of refrigeration now make it possible to preserve meat in any season". As recently as 2012, official church spokesperson Michael Otterson stated "the church has also encouraged limiting meat consumption in favor of grains, fruits and vegetables." Of note is that the LDS Church owns and operates Deseret Ranches in central Florida, which is one of the largest cow–calf operations in the United States.

Some members of the Religious Society of Friends (also known as Quakers) practice vegetarianism or veganism as a reflection of the Peace Testimony, extending non-violence towards animals. Historically, the early vegetarian movement had many Quaker promoters. Some Ranter groups – non-conformist Christian groups that existed in seventeenth-century England – were vegetarian.

In 1891, the Friends' Anti-Vivisection Association was founded, later becoming the Animal Welfare and Anti-Vivisection Society and subsequently Quaker Concern for Animals, reflecting a longstanding institutional engagement with animal welfare within the Society of Friends. In 1902, the Friends Vegetarian Society was established as a Quaker organisation. More recently, Quaker Vegan Witness (QVW), founded in 2019, has continued this tradition, organising vegan witness activities within British Quaker communities.

Roman Catholic monastic orders such as the Carthusians and Cistercians follow a pescatarian diet. Carmelites and others following the Rule of St. Albert also maintain a vegetarian diet, although the old and sick are permitted to eat meat according to this rule of life. The Order of Minims, an order of friars founded by St. Francis of Paola in the 15th century, goes further: in addition to the standard three religious vows of chastity, poverty, and obedience, its members take a fourth vow of vita quadragesimalis ("a Lenten way of life"), committing to perpetual abstinence from all meat, eggs, and dairy products.

Christian anarchists, such as Leo Tolstoy, Ammon Hennacy, and Théodore Monod, extend the Christian principles of compassion and nonviolence through following a vegetarian diet.

=== Contemporary movements ===
The Christian Vegetarian Association (CVA) is an international, non-denominational Christian vegetarian organization that promotes responsible stewardship of God's creation through plant-based eating. The CVA produced the 2006 film Honoring God's Creation.

Sarx is a UK-based organization which aims to "empower Christians to champion the cause of animals and live peacefully with all God's creatures". Sarx publishes interviews with Christian vegans and vegetarians on its website, and provides people to speak at Churches in the UK on topics such as Christianity and veganism, animal welfare and faith, creation and animals.

CreatureKind is an organization which exists "to encourage Christians to recognize faith-based reasons for caring about the well-being of fellow animal creatures used for food, and to take practical action in response". It was founded by David Clough, Professor of Theological Ethics at the University of Chester, and is directed by Clough and Sarah Withrow King, an American author and deputy directory of the Sider Center at Eastern University. CreatureKind produces a course for churches to do which facilitates church groups to think through how Christians should respond to and treat animals.

Creation Care Church is a virtual Christian church community, founded in 2021, that teaches a Bible-based approach to caring for the earth and all its inhabitants, including living a compassionate vegan lifestyle that shows mercy to all of God's creatures.

Catholic Concern for Animals (CCA) is a charity which calls Catholics "to cherish and care for all of [God's] creation". CCA has for "many years" promoted a vegetarian/vegan diet as a way of caring for creation, in particular animals.

The group Evangelicals for Social Action have suggested that a vegan diet is a way of demonstrating Christian love and compassion to farmed animals, and argue in particular that this is what a consistently pro-life ethic looks like.

Christian Vegetarians and Vegans UK is an organization seeking to promote a vegetarian/vegan lifestyle in the Church in the UK.

Quaker Vegan Witness (QVW) is a contemporary Quaker movement founded in 2019, focused on animal ethics and vegan living within Quaker communities. Since its founding, QVW has organized witness activities and educational sessions at Quaker Yearly Meeting.

== Partial fasting and temporary abstinence ==
=== Eastern Christianity ===
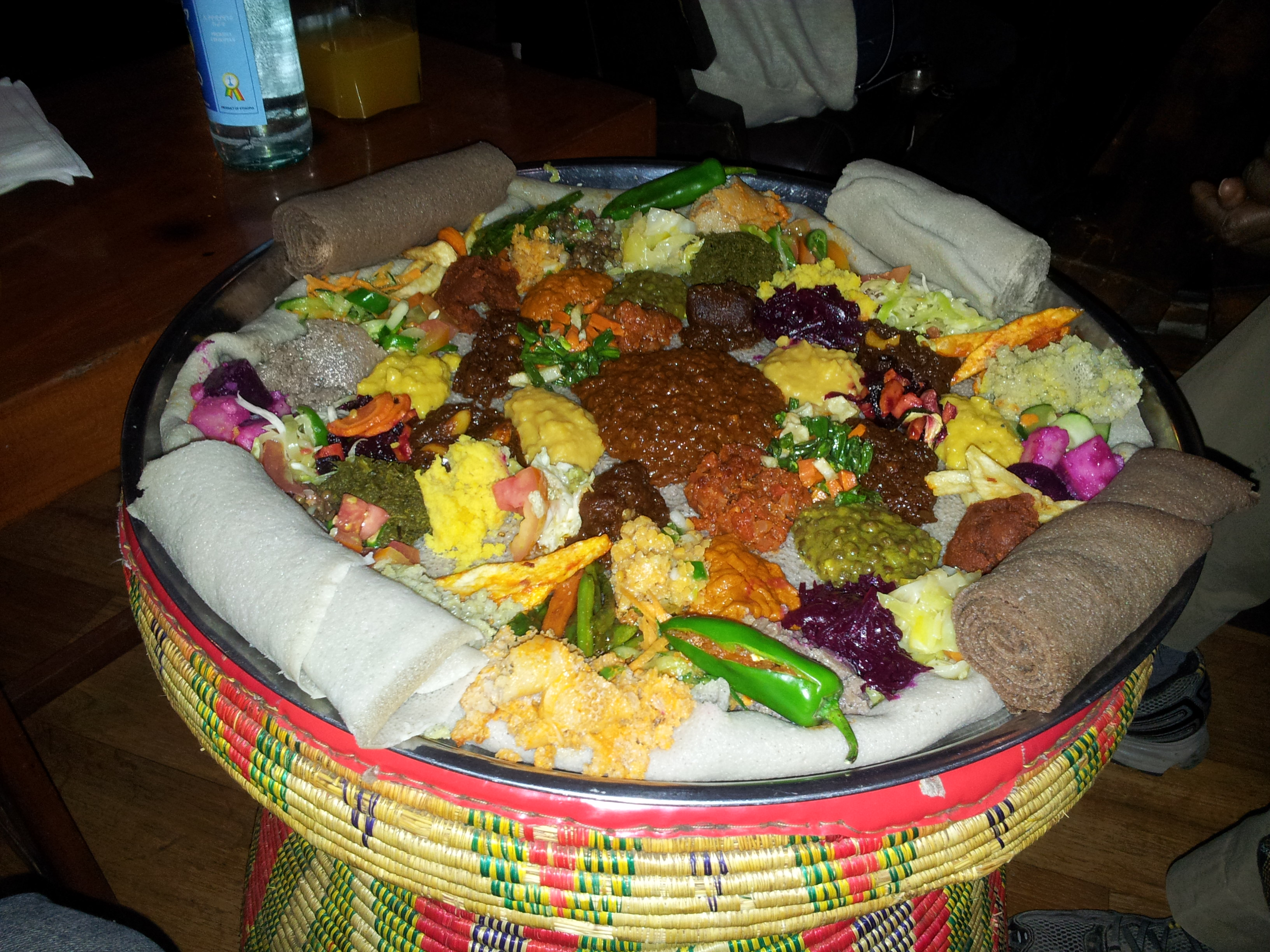
A vegan Ethiopian Yetsom beyaynetu, compatible with fasting rules

During Lent some Christian communities, such as Orthodox Christians in the Middle East, undertake partial fasting eating only one light meal per day. For strict Greek Orthodox Christians and Copts, all meals during this 40-day period are prepared without animal products and are essentially vegan. Unlike veganism, however, abstaining from animal products during Lent is intended to be only temporary and not a permanent way of life.

Eastern Orthodox laity traditionally abstains from animal products on Wednesdays (because, according to Christian tradition, Judas betrayed Jesus on the Wednesday prior to the Crucifixion of Jesus) and Fridays (because Jesus is thought to have been crucified on the subsequent Friday), as well as during the four major fasting periods of the year: Great Lent, the Apostles' Fast, the Dormition Fast and the Nativity Fast. Catholic laity traditionally abstain from animal flesh on Fridays and through the Lenten season leading up to Easter (sometimes being required to do so by law, see fasting and abstinence in the Roman Catholic Church), some also, as a matter of private piety, observe Wednesday abstinence. Fish is not considered proper meat in any case (see pescetarianism, though the Eastern Orthodox allow fish only on days on which the fasting is lessened but meat still not allowed). For these practices, "animal rights" are no motivation and positive environmental or individual health effects only a surplus benefit; the actual reason is to practice mortification and some marginal asceticism.

Oriental Orthodox, Eastern Orthodox, and Eastern Catholic monastics abstain from meat year-round, and many abstain from dairy and seafood as well. Through obedience to the Orthodox Church and its ascetic practices, the Orthodox Christian seeks to rid himself or herself of the passions, or the disposition to sin.

=== Western Christianity ===
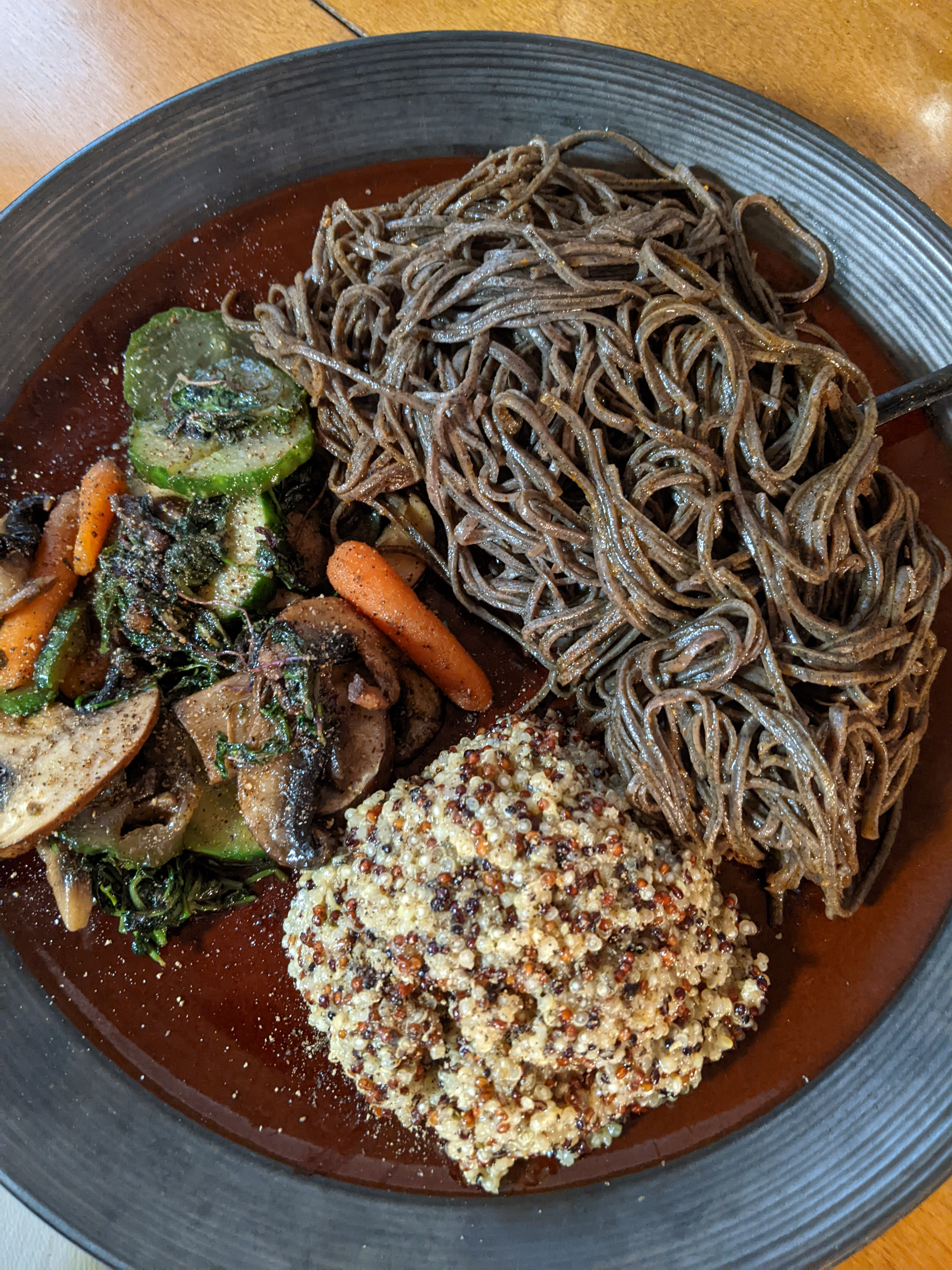
A Lenten supper prepared according to the diet specified in the Daniel Fast: this particular meal includes black bean spaghetti, quinoa, and mixed vegetables composed of cucumbers, mushrooms, microgreens, arugula, and baby carrots.

In Western Christianity, fasting is observed during the forty-day season of Lent by many communicants of the Catholic Church, Lutheran Churches, Anglican Communion, Methodist Churches and the Western Orthodox Churches to commemorate the fast observed by Christ during his temptation in the desert. While some Western Christians fast during the entire season of Lent, Ash Wednesday and Good Friday are emphasized by Western certain Christian denominations as especially important days of fasting within the Lenten season. In many Western Christian Churches, including those of the Catholic, Methodist and Baptist traditions, certain congregations have committed to undertaking the Daniel Fast during the whole season of Lent, in which believers practice abstinence from meat, lacticinia and alcohol for the entire forty days of the liturgical season.

According to Canon Law, Roman Catholics are required to abstain from meat (defined as all animal flesh and organs, excluding water animals) on Ash Wednesday and all Fridays of Lent including Good Friday. Ash Wednesday and Good Friday are also fast days for Catholics ages 18 to 60, in which one main meal and two half-meals are eaten, with no snacking. Canon Law also obliges Catholics to abstain from meat on the Fridays of the year outside of Lent (excluding certain holy days) unless, with the permission of the local conference of bishops, another penitential act is substituted. Exceptions are allowed for health and necessity like manual labor and not causing offense when being a guest. The restrictions on eating meat on these days is solely as an act of penance and not because of a religious objection to eating meat. The United States Conference of Catholic Bishops has made substitution of a different penitential or charitable act an option for ordinary Fridays in their territory. After previous abolition, the Catholic Bishops' Conference of England and Wales restored the meatless ordinary Friday requirement for their territory effective September, 2011. A popular misconception is that Pope Gregory I (who ruled from 590 to 604, and who is also a canonized saint) declared that rabbits were not meat. This is apparently a corruption of a manuscript in which Saint Gregory of Tours described one person (who was also ill and might not have been Catholic) eating a rabbit fetus during Lent. The rules are widely ignored; a 2016 survey found that only 62% of U.S. Catholics said they avoid meat on Fridays during Lent.

A Handbook for the Discipline of Lent delineates the following Lutheran fasting guidelines:

1. Fast on Ash Wednesday and Good Friday with only one simple meal during the day, usually without meat.
2. Refrain from eating meat (bloody foods) on all Fridays in Lent, substituting fish for example.
3. Eliminate a food or food group for the entire season. Especially consider saving rich and fatty foods for Easter.
4. Consider not eating before receiving Communion in Lent.
5. Abstain from or limit a favorite activity (television, movies, etc.) for the entire season, and spend more time in prayer, Bible study, and reading devotional material.

It is the practice of many Lutherans to abstain from alcohol and meat on the Fridays of Lent; a Black Fast has been historically kept by Lutherans on Good Friday.

In Anglicanism, the Book of Common Prayer prescribes certain days as days for fasting and abstinence from meat, "consisting of the 40 days of Lent, the ember days, the three Rogation days (the Monday to Wednesday following the Sunday after Ascension Day, which is also known as Holy Thursday), and all Fridays in the year (except Christmas, if it falls on a Friday)":

A Table of the Vigils, Fasts, and Days of Abstinence, to be Observed in the Year.

The eves (vigils) before:

The Nativity of our Lord.
The Purification of the Blessed Virgin Mary.
The Annunciation of the Blessed Virgin.
Easter Day.
Ascension Day.
Pentecost.
St. Matthias.
St. John Baptist.
St. Peter.
St. James.
St. Bartholomew.
St. Matthew.
St. Simon and St. Jude.
St. Andrew.
St. Thomas.
All Saints' Day.

Note: if any of these Feast-Days fall upon a Monday, then the Vigil or Fast-Day shall be kept upon the Saturday, and not upon the Sunday next before it.
Days of Fasting, or Abstinence.

I. The Forty Days of Lent.
II. The Ember Days at the Four Seasons, being the Wednesday, Friday, and Saturday after the First Sunday in Lent, the Feast of Pentecost, September 14, and December 13.
III. The Three Rogation Days, being the Monday, Tuesday, and Wednesday, before Holy Thursday, or the Ascension of our Lord.
IV. All the Fridays in the Year, except Christmas Day.

Methodism's historic liturgical book The Sunday Service of the Methodists (put together by John Wesley), as well as The Directions Given to Band Societies (25 December 1744), mandate fasting and abstinence from meat on all Fridays of the year (except Christmas Day, if it falls on a Friday).

== See also ==
- Animal chaplains
- Animal theology
- Benjamin Urrutia
- Christian dietary laws
- Christian diet programs
- Christian pacifism
- Daniel Fast
- Eastern Orthodox fasting
- Ethiopian Orthodox Tewahedo Church fasting
- Fruitarianism
- Jain vegetarianism
- Jesuism
- Jewish vegetarianism
- List of diets
- Postmodern Christianity
- Simple living
- Vegetarian cuisine
- Vegetarianism and religion
