= Injera =

Fermented flatbread from Ethiopia and Eritrea

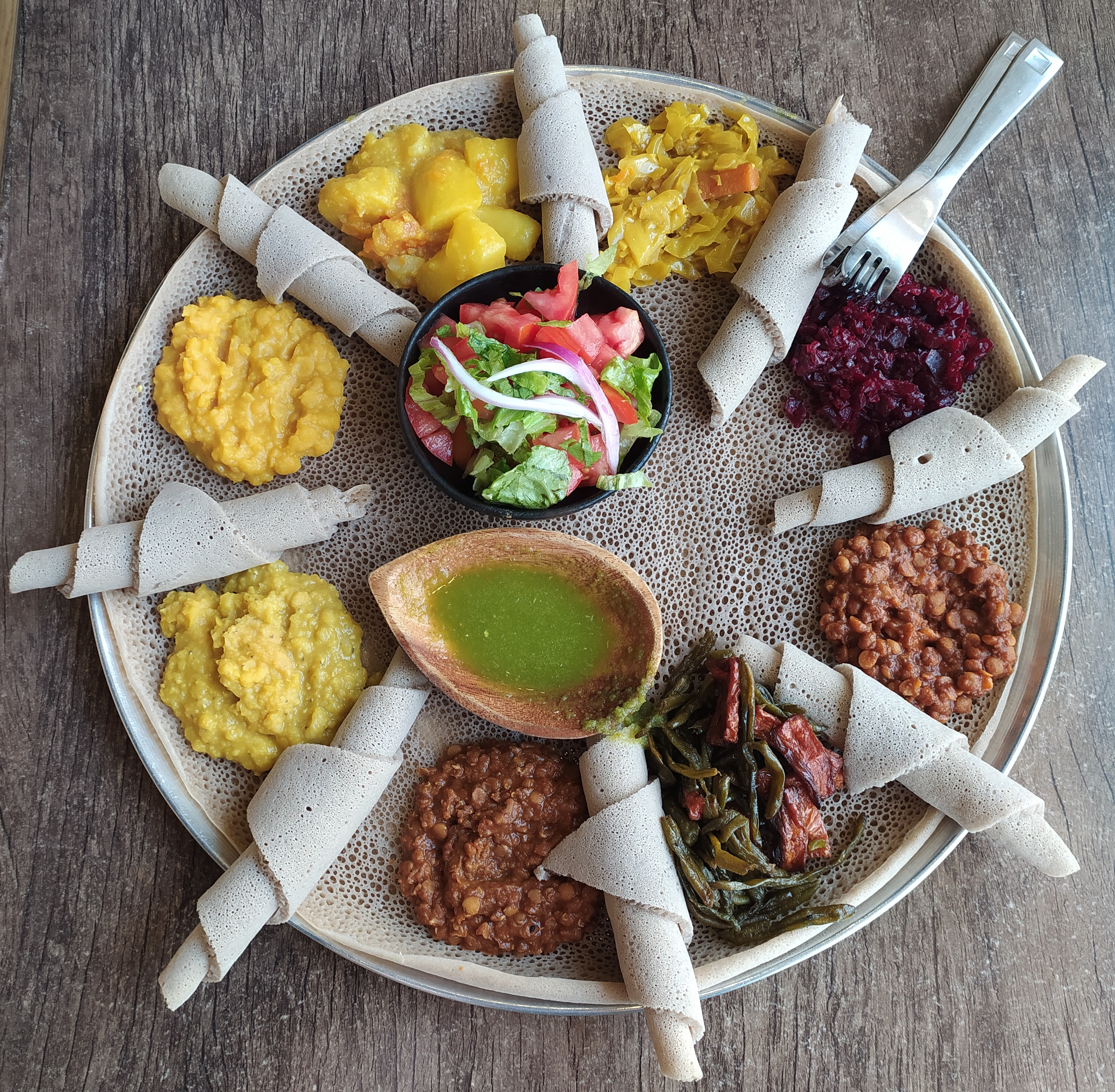
- Beyaynetu: Meal consisting of injera and several kinds of wat or tsebhi (stew), typical of Ethiopian cuisine
- Type: Flatbread or pancake
- Place of origin: Ethiopia
- Main ingredients: Teff flour (or sometimes wheat, barley, millet, sorghum, Maize, or rice flour)

Injera, also known as taita (Amharic: እንጀራ, romanized: ənǧära, [ɨnd͡ʒəra]; Tigrinya: ጣይታ, romanized: ṭayta), is a sour fermented pancake-like flatbread with a slightly spongy texture, traditionally made of teff flour. In Ethiopia, injera is a staple. Injera is central to the dining process in Amhara society, like bread or rice is elsewhere in parts of the world, and is usually stored in a mesob.

== Terminology ==
The word injera is from Amharic. It is also spelled enjera, ingera, or aenjera.

== Preparation ==
=== Ingredients ===
Injera is usually made of teff, originated in Ethiopia, and is mostly consumed in Ethiopia and Eritrea. Teff is sifted and milled into a fine flour. It is kneaded with water into a dough, usually by hand. The ratio of flour to water ranges from equal parts to two-thirds. The ingredients are kneaded in a container called a bohaka to form a watery dough.

Teff is the preferred grain for making injera, because of its sensory attributes (color and flavor) as well as its long shelf life. Teff seeds are graded according to color, used to make different kinds of injera: nech (white), quey (red), and sergegna (mixed). The primary use of teff is injera.

Injera is made with a variety of different grains, including barley, finger millet, sorghum, wheat, maize, and rice, which may or may not be mixed with teff. The grains are milled into flour, often with disc mills. The proportions of grains vary based on local and family traditions as well as financial considerations. In the lowlands, injera is often made with sorghum, and in the highlands, it is more commonly made with barley. Rice flour is sometimes used in commercially produced injera as it is cheaper and more common than teff. Among the Ethiopian diaspora, injera is made of rice flour or a mix of rice and wheat flour.

As teff is expensive, pure teff injera is a symbol of wealth. White-grained teff is more expensive to buy and thus symbolizes a higher status than its cheaper counterpart, red-grained teff. When blending teff with other flours, high- and middle-income Ethiopians prefer rice flour as it produces a similar white color. Low-income Ethiopians are more likely to use sorghum or maize. Use of various flours fluctuates based on the price relative to teff. Commercial injera producers mix teff with other flours depending on pricing as well as the preferences of consumers of different origins. Flour mixing increased between 1991 and 2001, according to a nationwide survey of retailers.

Spices such as coriander or fenugreek are sometimes added to injera for flavor. Legumes such as chickpeas, fava beans, and lentils can be mixed into teff injera to increase protein.

=== Fermentation ===
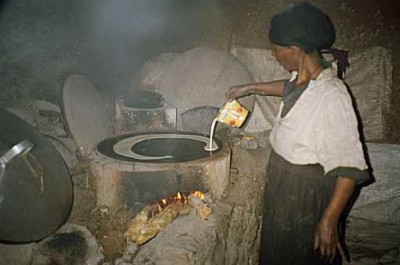
Batter is poured rapidly in a spiral from the outside inwards. Debre Markos, Ethiopia.

The dough is fermented by adding a starter known as ersho, (Note: Ersho is known in Oromo as raacitii.) a clear, yellow liquid that accumulates on the surface of fermenting teff flour batter and is collected from previous fermentations. It contains about 96% water, along with nutrients and microbes that cause fermentation. The amount of ersho may be about 16% of the flour. Even without ersho, fermentation occurs from the contact between flour and water. Commercial yeast is less commonly used, which is faster but results in inoptimal flavor and texture.

The dough undergoes a primary fermentation for 24 to 72 hours. The time depends on the microbial content—which is impacted by the dough's pH and amount of damaged starch—as well as the amount of ersho, altitude, temperature, type of container, and cleanliness. During the primary fermentation, the level of gas formation decreases for about 31 hours, the volume increases for about 48 hours, and acidity increases to a pH below 5.8. The first 18–24 hours involves the highest expansion of the dough as gases rapidly form. Liquids and solids separate, with a yellow liquid surfacing after 30–33 hours of fermentation, which is discarded.

After the primary fermentation, a portion of the dough is added to water and brought to a boil, forming a pregelatinized starch product known as absit, which functions as a dough binder. About 10% of the dough may be used for absit, and it is mixed with about 3 times as much water, though the amount varies. Once the absit is cooled to about 46°C (46 °C (115 °F)), it is added back to the dough. Once absit is added, the dough undergoes a secondary fermentation for 30–120 minutes. This stage involves the formation of gas bubbles, making the bread puffy. Dough is saved for ersho at the end of the secondary fermentation, and the residue is left in the container.

The fermentation of injera is caused by yeast and lactic acid bacteria, which increase thousandfold during 48 hours of fermentation. At least 68 species of yeasts have been identified in injera—including the genera Saccharomyces, Pichia, and Candida—as well as at least 107 species of lactic acid bacteria—including the genera Lactobacillus, Lactococcus, Leuconostoc, Pediococcus, and Streptococcus.

The fermentation gives injera a sour taste. Variations of injera are based on the fermentation time before creating the absit:

- If the dough is fermented for a moderate amount of time, it is smooth and thin. This is the most popular type.
- If the dough is fermented for less time—12–24 hours—it results in a thick injera that is sweet and dark red on the bottom. This is known in Amharic and Oromo as aflegna or in Tigrinya as bekuo.
- If the dough is fermented longer, the injera is very sour, due to the increased amount of lactic acid bacteria, and is considered less nutritious. This is known in Amharic and Tigrinya as komtata injera and in Oromo as qomxoxaa caabitaa. It sometimes has additional flour and water added after the fermentation.
- Injera made without absit is soft and thin and does not have eyes.

=== Cooking ===
After fermentation, more water is added to turn the dough into a batter. Injera is cooked by pouring the mixture onto a large, smooth, circular griddle, known as a mitad. The mitad is heated to 90–95°C (90 to 95 °C (194 to 203 °F)); lower temperatures would cause the dough to stick to the surface. It is greased, often with canola oil or animal fat. About 2/3 liter of batter is poured onto the griddle in a spiral from the outside inwards. It is covered with a lid. (Note: The lid is called kidan, also known in Amharic as akambalo or in Oromo as qadaada eelee caabitaa.) It is cooked for 2–4 minutes, with the cooking time depending on thickness, temperature, and amount of steam. It is covered while cooking, causing it to be leavened by steam due to the high moisture content. Steam formation increases starch gelatinization, resulting in visible bubbles known as "eyes". Injera is not flipped while cooking, causing the bottom to be smooth while the top forms bubbles.

Mitads are made of clay. They are not typically made of metal as it does not allow adequate temperature control. The most common type of mitad is electric, using an aluminium lid connected with a hinge to the clay griddle.

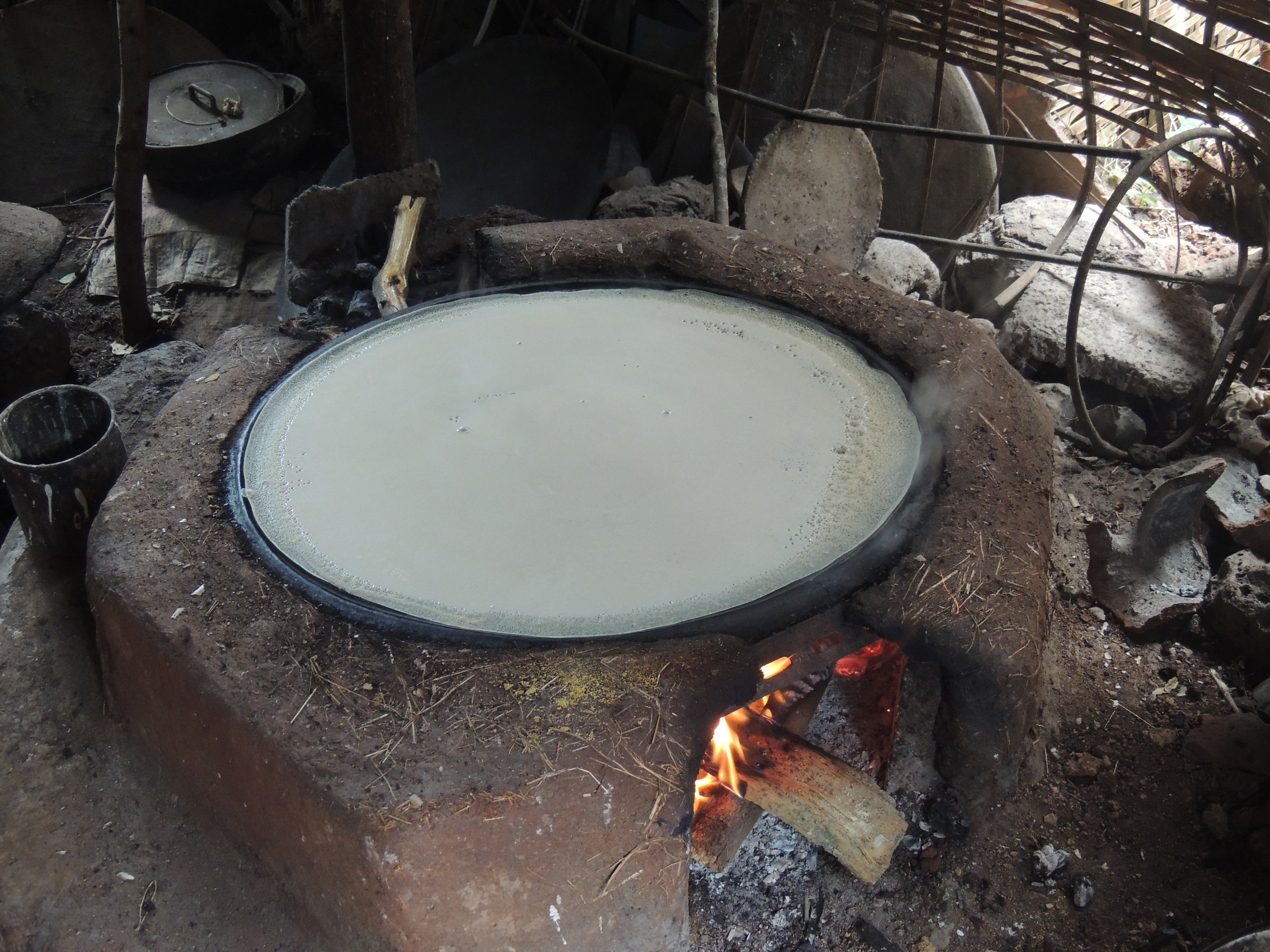
Injera being cooked on a griddle

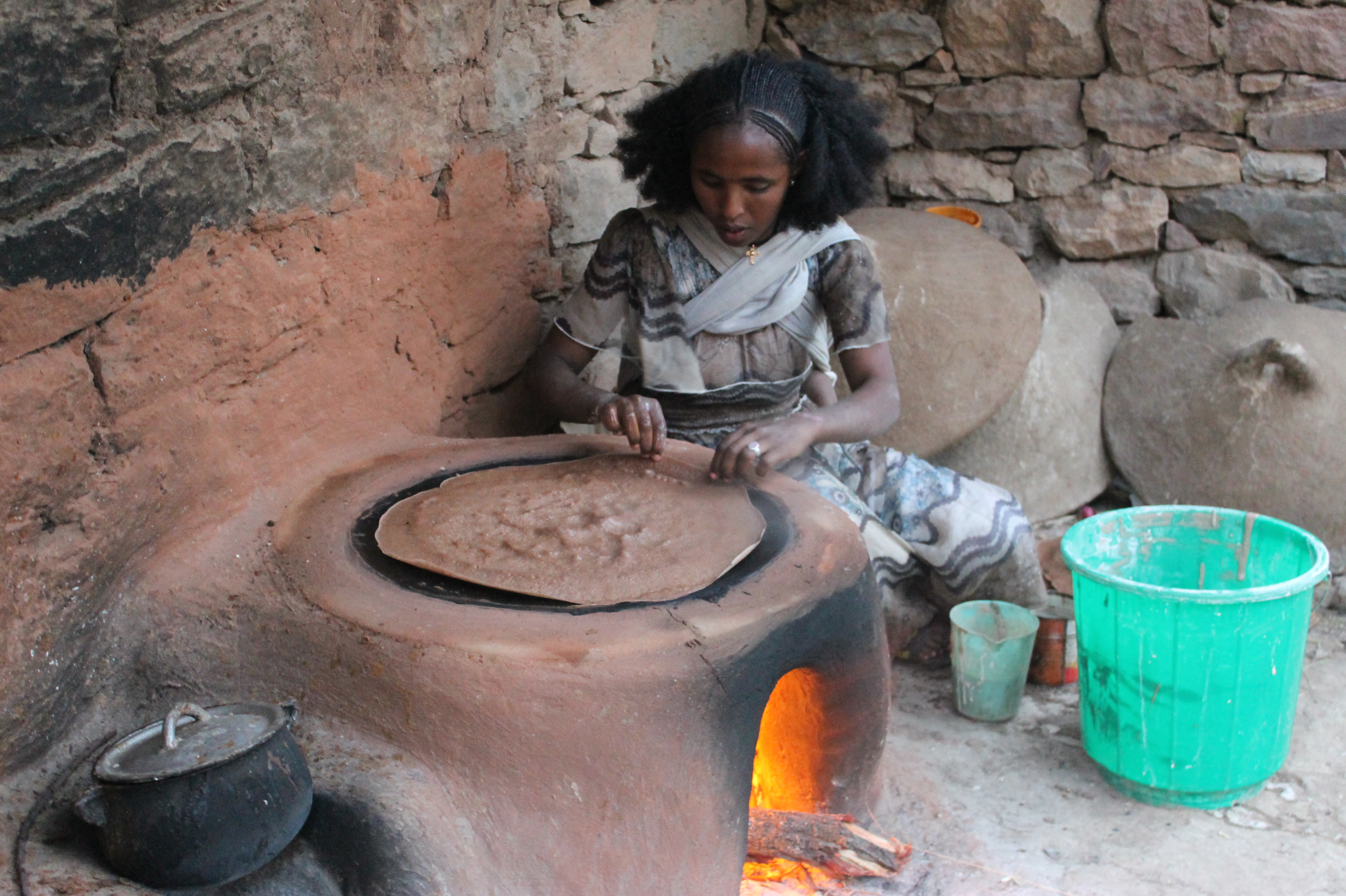
Woman checking the baking of an injera in her house. Gheralta, Ethiopia.

Machines for mass production of foods like injera typically pour batter onto a rotating heat element, then put the cooked injeras onto a conveyor belt on which they are cooled.

Injera is large and very thin, with a diameter of about 50–60 cm (60 centimetres (24 in)) and a thickness of about 6–7 mm.

=== Classification and similar breads ===
Injera may be classified as a pancake as it is made of batter, or it may be described as a pancake-like flatbread. It is classified as a fermented pancake, like the crumpet in English cuisine, which similarly has air bubbles.

Lahoh is similar to injera but is thicker and uses sorghum as the main ingredient. A similar bread is kisra, which is thinner than injera and cooked uncovered. The similarity between kisra and injera suggests that they may be related, though food scholar Hamid A. Dihar believes that they are not. Like injera, lahoh and kisra become puffy due to fermentation. The Ethiopian flatbread kitcha is made of teff but is unfermented and thicker than injera. The cumboo is made of the same dough as aflegna injera.

Dosa is a similar fermented batter bread from southern India. However, it uses black gram and rice, is only fermented overnight, and can be prepared thinner and crispier.

== Serving ==
Injera is stored in a cylindrical straw basket called a mesob, in which it may be covered in plastic. However, aflegna injera does not last as long in a mesob. Dried injera, or dirkosh, can be stored in a dry place for up to a year and rehydrated. Fit-fit is a dish consisting of dried injera in tomato sauce.

The most common pairing with injera is wat, a stew of meat and vegetables. This includes doro wat, made with chicken, and shiro, made of pulses without meat. Other foods eaten with injera include meat or boiled vegetables. Using one's hand (traditionally only the right one), small pieces of injera are torn and used to grasp the stews and salads for eating. The eyes of injera help to pick up stews as they soak into the bread.

A typical shared meal consists of a stack of injera with vegetable or meat dishes on top. Two or three people may share the same injera. It is often both the serving platter and utensil for a meal. Hearty stews such as wat are placed on top of the bread and then the meal is eaten by tearing pieces of injera off and scooping up the stews. The injera served on the bottom soaks up the juices and flavors of the foods. Once the meal is over, this "tablecloth" of injera is also consumed.

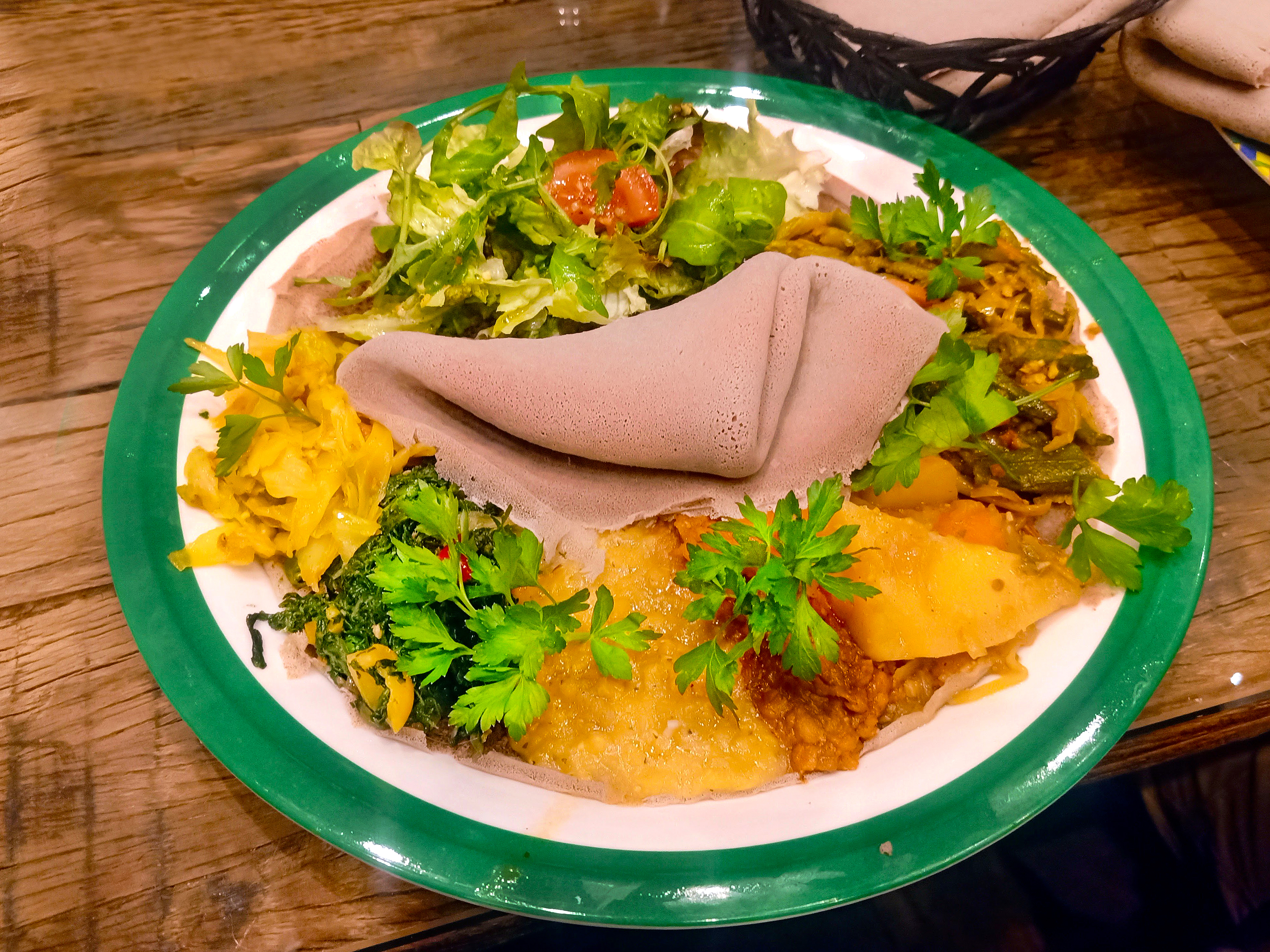
Ethiopian vegetarian food Injera plate

== Nutrition and properties ==
Teff injera
Nutritional value per 100 g (3.5 oz)
- Energy: 88 kcal (370 kJ)
- Carbohydrates: 18.31 g
- Dietary fiber: 2.7 g
- Fat: 0.83 g
- Saturated: 0.177
- Monounsaturated: 0.272
- Polyunsaturated: 0.236
- Protein: 3.48 g
Vitamins and minerals
Vitamins	Quantity %DV^{†}
Vitamin A equiv. lutein zeaxanthin	49 μg
Thiamine (B1)	0% 0.174 μg
Riboflavin (B2)	6% 0.076 mg
Niacin (B3)	11% 1.711 mg
Vitamin B6	8% 0.143 mg
Folate (B9)	7% 29 μg
Vitamin E	1% 0.08 mg
Vitamin K	1% 1.7 μg
Minerals	Quantity %DV^{†}
Calcium	1% 13 mg
Copper	16% 0.14 mg
Iron	6% 1.03 mg
Magnesium	15% 64 mg
Phosphorus	7% 89 mg
Potassium	5% 152 mg
Selenium	3% 1.5 μg
Sodium	10% 229 mg
Zinc	8% 0.85 mg
- Link to USDA Database entry
- ^{†}Percentages estimated using US recommendations for adults, except for potassium, which is estimated based on expert recommendation from the National Academies. Source: USDA

Injera is low in protein because its nutrition comes entirely from grains. It is high in prebiotics and probiotics due to the fiber content of the grains and the fermentation process. The fermentation process also breaks down phytic acid, which increases the mineral value of teff, which is high in minerals including iron. Thus, frequent consumption of teff injera is associated with low rates of anemia. The cooking process results in the loss of the vitamin folate by over half, but the fermentation process increases folate retention. Teff injera has a high glycemic index. It is also high in antinutrients such as tannins. It contains about 59.8% water.

Injera is ideally soft and pliable so it can wrap around accompanying foods. Other desired qualities include thinness and sour flavor. Qualities of injera can vary widely as it involves a lengthy, artisinal process, and qualities such as texture and bubbliness cannot be measured objectively. Differences in microbial content can change the flavor.

The absit process significantly impacts sensory qualities. It helps achieve a smooth texture with eyes. When using grains other than teff, millet, or corn, absit may not be needed. However, when using sorghum, the step is necessary to increase the viscosity to that of teff dough and produce uniform eyes. The liquid that forms during primary fermentation contains minerals, sugars, amino acids, and riboflavin, so its removal decreases injera's nutritional value.

Injera has a shelf life of about 3 days, being spoiled by mold. In extreme circumstances, injera that has become moldy may be sun-dried and eaten. Chemical preservatives may increase the shelf life to 12 days. Injera from white teff has a higher shelf life than dark teff.

Compared to other grains such as sorghum, teff absorbs more water because of its very small starch granules. This makes teff injera more flexible and better at keeping its softness. Teff also differs from such grains because the prolamin proteins in teff are hydrophobic and experience low polymerization. Rice flour produces injera similar to teff as the type and size of the starch granules are similar. However, rice injera has a bad shelf life, staling after one day. Maize injera is sticky and also stales after one day. Studies have found that using additional grains in teff injera may result in comparable qualities to pure teff injera. Teff mixed with sorghum has better sensory qualities than sorghum alone.

Studies have found that grains other than teff may result in improved nutrition. For example, adding wheat to teff may increase nutrition as wheat causes higher breakdown of phytic acid.

== History ==
Although teff and griddle-like trays appeared in Aksumite archaeology, no scholars stated that injera was the staple food in the kingdom of Aksum or that its people consumed teff injera. Teff consumption spread over a period of 250 years from the 1520s.The reason for teff becoming the staple food during this period was due to food shortage caused by climate change and wars. Other cereals such as barley, sorghum, wheat, and millet were cultivated more than teff and were used to make the staple flat bread known as kita.

By the beginning of the 17th century, teff consumption became widespread in the Ethiopian Kingdom. Initially, the teff was used to make flat bread, not injera. It was not fermented nor was it sour tasting. The batter was spread with hand on the griddle to take a circular form. It had a texture similar to kita (ቂጣ) and was turned over and baked on both sides. Injera did not evolve from bread (kita). Teff was the old ingredient, and the clay griddle was the old tool, injera was a new cooking technique that turned those same materials into a totally different food.

Teff consumption replaced other cereals and became more popular during the Gondar Period (1632-1769). It became a primary staple by early 1750s. Early mentions of injera in Ethiopia appeared only in records produced after the fourteenth century. A book titled Ser'ata Gebr (ስርዓተ ግብር) written by royal chronicles during the time of Empero Zera Yaqob includes lists of items provided during in the court and the term injera appears among the foods recorded. The word injera was used in the 14th century in the book. By this time, the teff mix was fermented, but the teff flatbread was turned over and baked on both sides. The method of making spongy present-day injera did not start until the 1770s.

The travel narrative of Francisco Alvares, who lived in Ethiopia during the 1520s, indicates that teff was not yet the main grain used in the Ethiopian kingdom at that time. Alvares made references to wheat, barley, sorghum, and millet as staples. He mentioned these were used for making bread. One hundred years after Alvares, a Portuguese Jesuit called M. Barradas added teff as one of the main cereals cultivated in the Ethiopian Kingdom.

The Spanish Jesuit missionary Pedro Paez who arrived in Ethiopia in 1603 recorded that Emperor Susenyos told him teff was initially eaten by the poor only during times of scarcity. In the travel accounts of J. Bruce, a Scottish explorer who reached Gondar in 1770, mentioned that the Abyssinians had plenty of excellent quality wheat. Yet wheat bread is consumed by people of the first rank, and teff bread was eaten by all sorts of people from the king downwards.

During the Gondarine period, the habit of eating sour tasting injera baked on both sides was becoming increasingly common among the royal family and the nobility. Jesuit writer and missionary Father Joao de Barradas, who worked in Ethiopia between 1624 and 1633, provided elaborate descriptions of royal banquets and courtly meals in Gondar. In these accounts, Barradas refers to a flatbread he called apas. Richard Pankhurst points out that the food identified as apa by the Jesuits corresponds to what is known today as injera. By 1751, the travel account of Prutky describes teff as the prized grain that was most extensively grown and consumed in the Kingdom. He also noted that injera was eaten with raw meat, grilled meat and curd. The curd had berbere (በርበሬ) sprinkled on it.

By the early 1770s, James Bruce noted that spongy, teff-based injera had spread widely and had become a staple food in the Ethiopian Kingdom. By then, the habit of eating fermented, spongy teff injera with a sour taste started becoming increasingly common in Gondar. His report details the same features as the present-day injera. In the early 1840s, the British Empire sent an embassy to the court of King Sahle Selassie of Shewa, led by W.C. Harris, who remained in Ethiopia from 1841 to 1843. In his published travel account, Harris reported that in Shewa, injera was eaten with "a stimulating pottage of onions, red pepper, and salt," a description corresponding to the dish now known as wot. This is the earliest textual reference to wat in connection with injera.

Though teff has been cultivated since the 4th millennium BC, there is no evidence that suggests it was used to make injera. According to botanists Robert B. Stewart and Asnake Getachew, folklore holds that teff originated around 100 BC, but this cannot be confirmed in the historical record. They speculate that injera may have been invented after someone left flour with moisture for a few days and found that it made a pleasant bread. Archaeologist Richard Wilding hypothesized that the presence of griddles may indicate the presence of teff. Mitads have been found at archaeological sites dating back as far as 600 AD.

Ethiopian teff production decreased during the famine of the 1980s. Ethiopian restaurants in the United States switched to other grains. At the time, teff was rarely grown outside of Ethiopia, but a small amount existed in the United States. Around the 1990s, farmer Wayne Carlson of Caldwell, Idaho, founded The Teff Company, one of the first in the country to produce it at a large scale, enabling teff injera to be made in the country.

Injera consumption in Ethiopia increased as demand for convenience food grew. The proportion of the country's food expenditure that went toward injera increased from 0.8% in 1996 and 2000 to 4.7% in 2011. Injera was still less common in rural areas. Ethiopian injera exports also increased, possibly due to an increase in airplane connections.

== Consumption and contemporary use ==
=== In Ethiopia and Eritrea ===
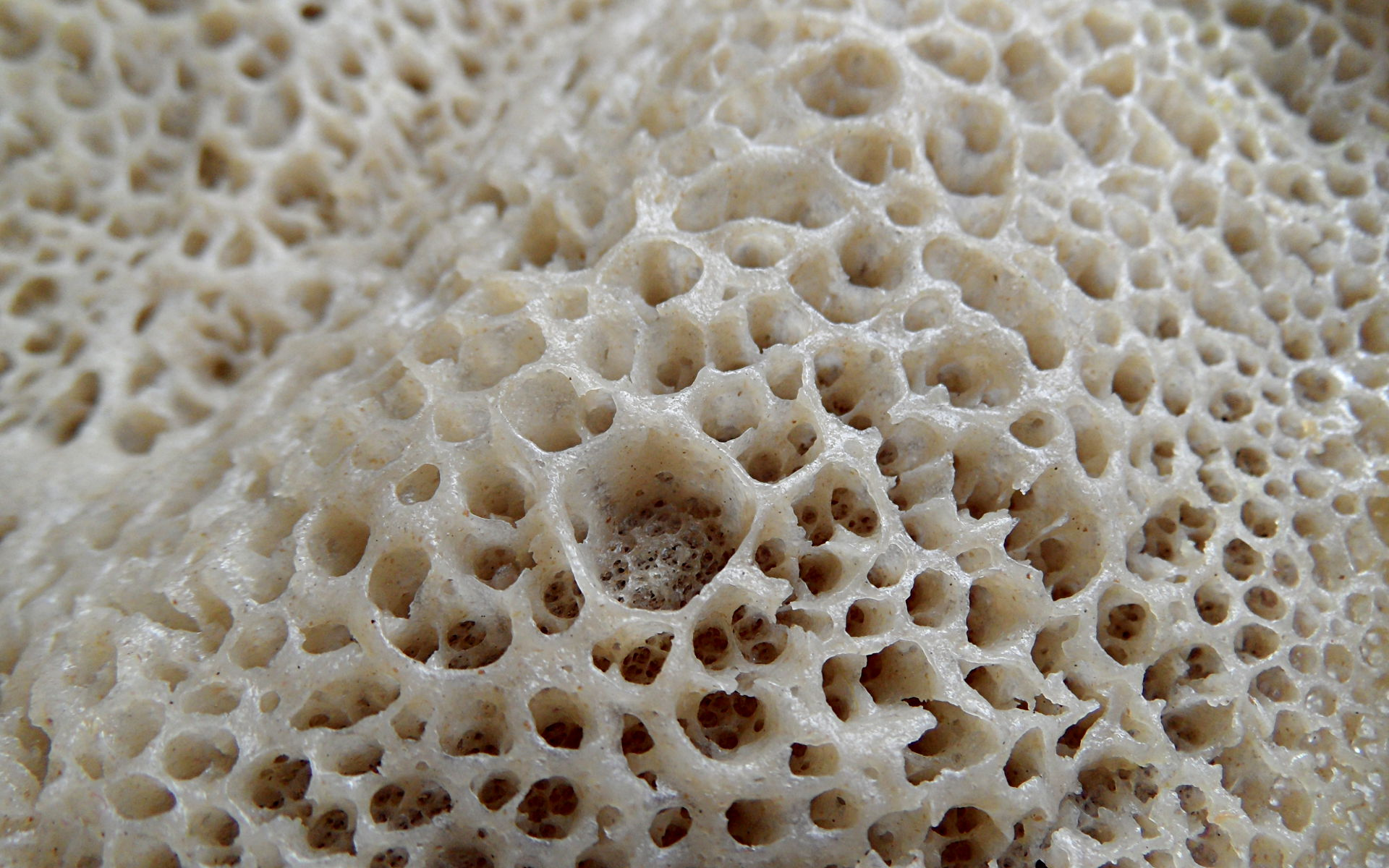
Injera showing typical spongy texture

Injera is the main staple food in Ethiopian cuisine, along with smaller amounts of other grains. Many Ethiopians prepare it every day. For some rural Ethiopians, it comprises 90% of their diet. Injera exists in all parts of Ethiopia, with some differences. aflegna injera is common in rural areas, but in cities, it is mainly made to save time. Komtata injera is not preferred by most Ethiopians, and is often made by people with less experience.

Injera comprises 20% of teff sales in Addis Ababa, a proportion that does not vary much over time. About 90% of these are retailers. Two types of retailers sell injera: baltena shops, which sell various flour products at fixed locations, and small, itinerant retailers known as gulit. Injera is also sold by wholesalers, including informal wholesalers and, less commonly, formal, branded companies. About 80% of sorghum in Ethiopia is used for injera, and its demand causes the grain to be more expensive than wheat in Ethiopia, unlike most of the world.

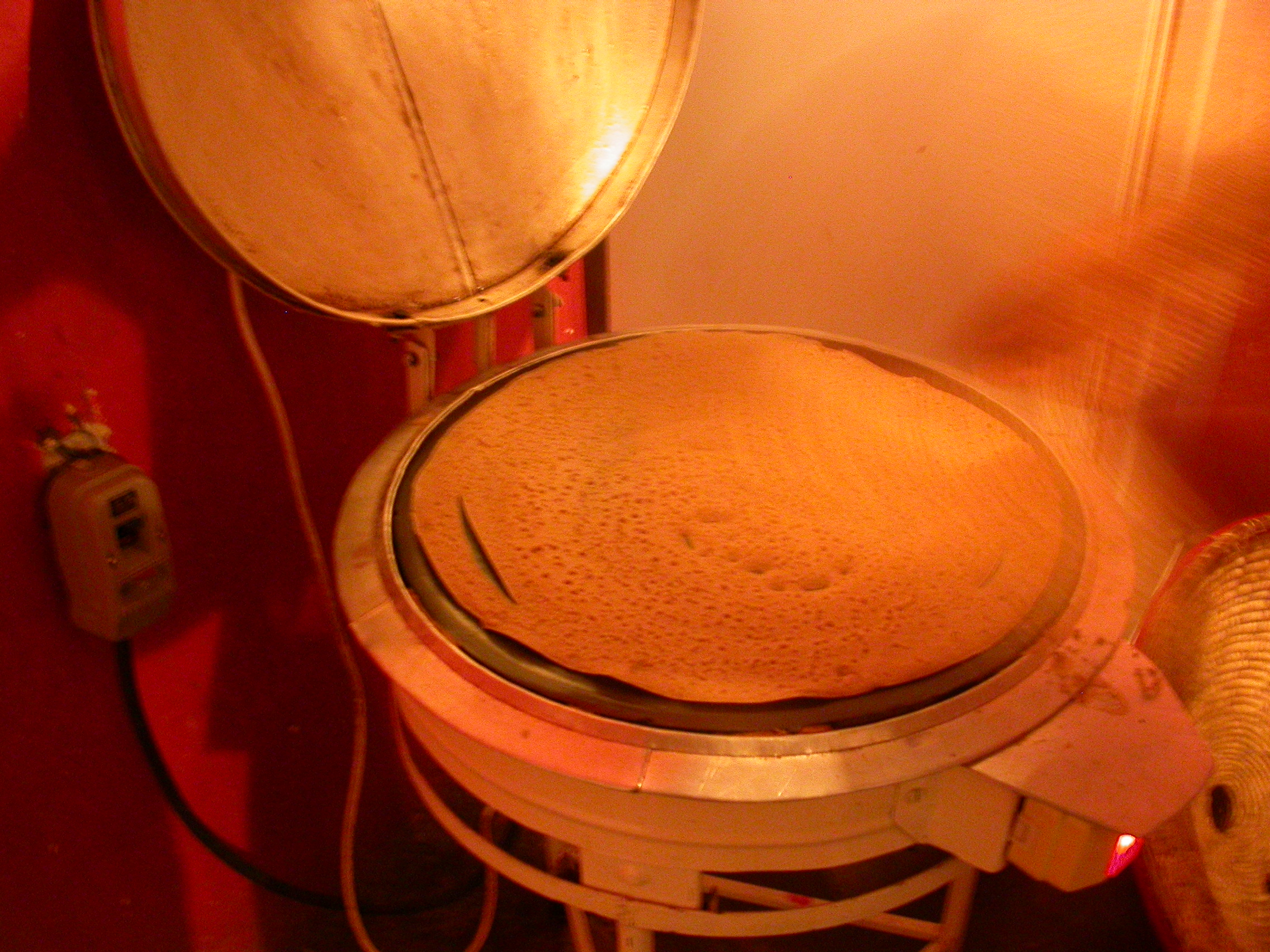
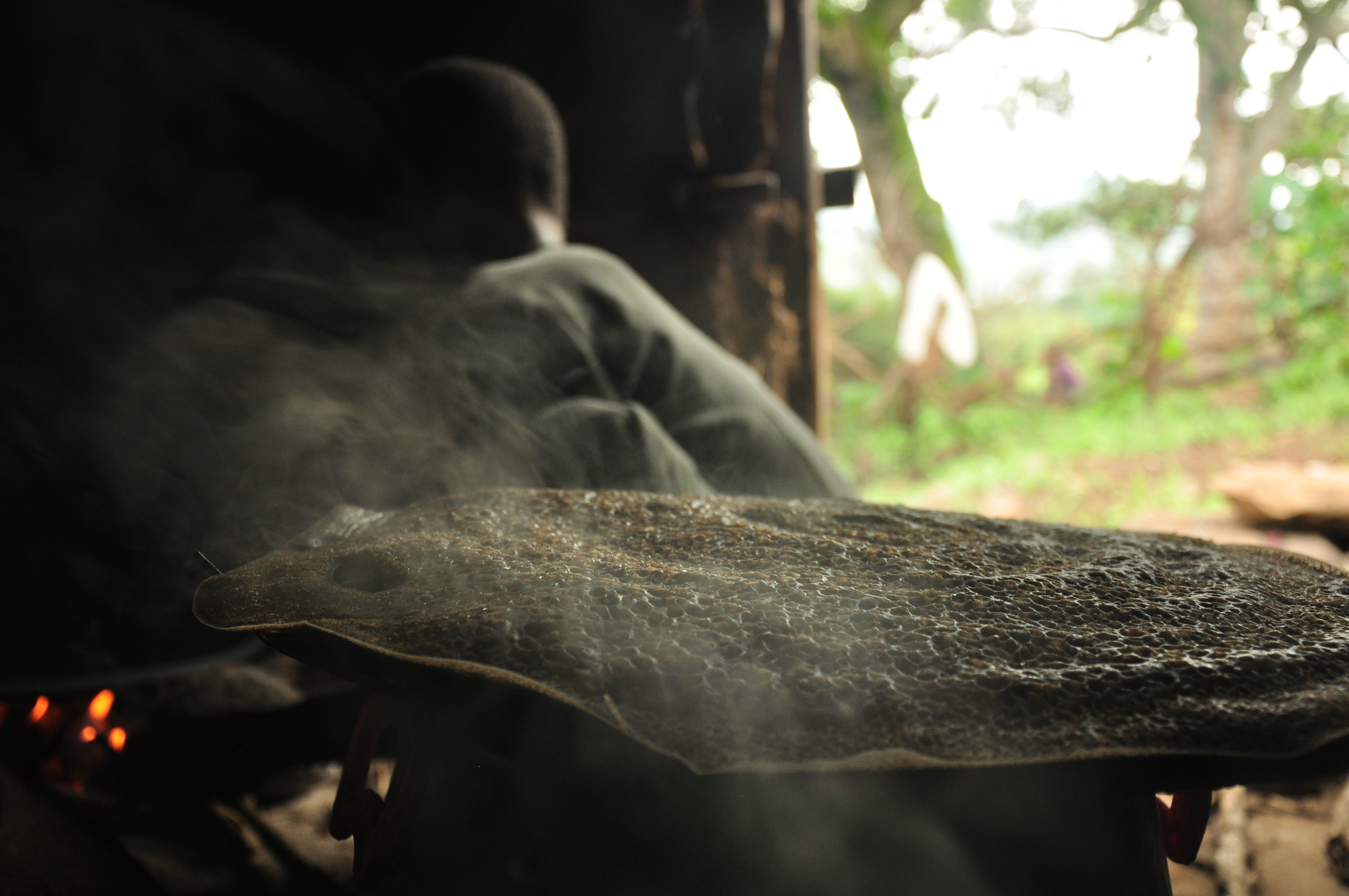
Left: An injera stove. Right: Freshly-baked injera.

=== Outside Ethiopia and Eritrea ===
Outside of Ethiopia and Eritrea, injera may be found in grocery stores and restaurants specializing in Ethiopian and Eritrean cooking, particularly in major cities. Injera is commonly eaten by the Ethiopian diaspora in the Western world.

There are similar variants to injera in other African countries, namely Sudan, Chad and Kenya. In Kenya, a variant of injera is eaten by the Borana and Gabra living in the northern parts of the country. It is increasingly popular in Israel due to immigration of Ethiopian Jews.

Injera exported US$10 million in 2015 (equivalent to 13000000 in 2025), with the largest market being North America.

==== United States ====
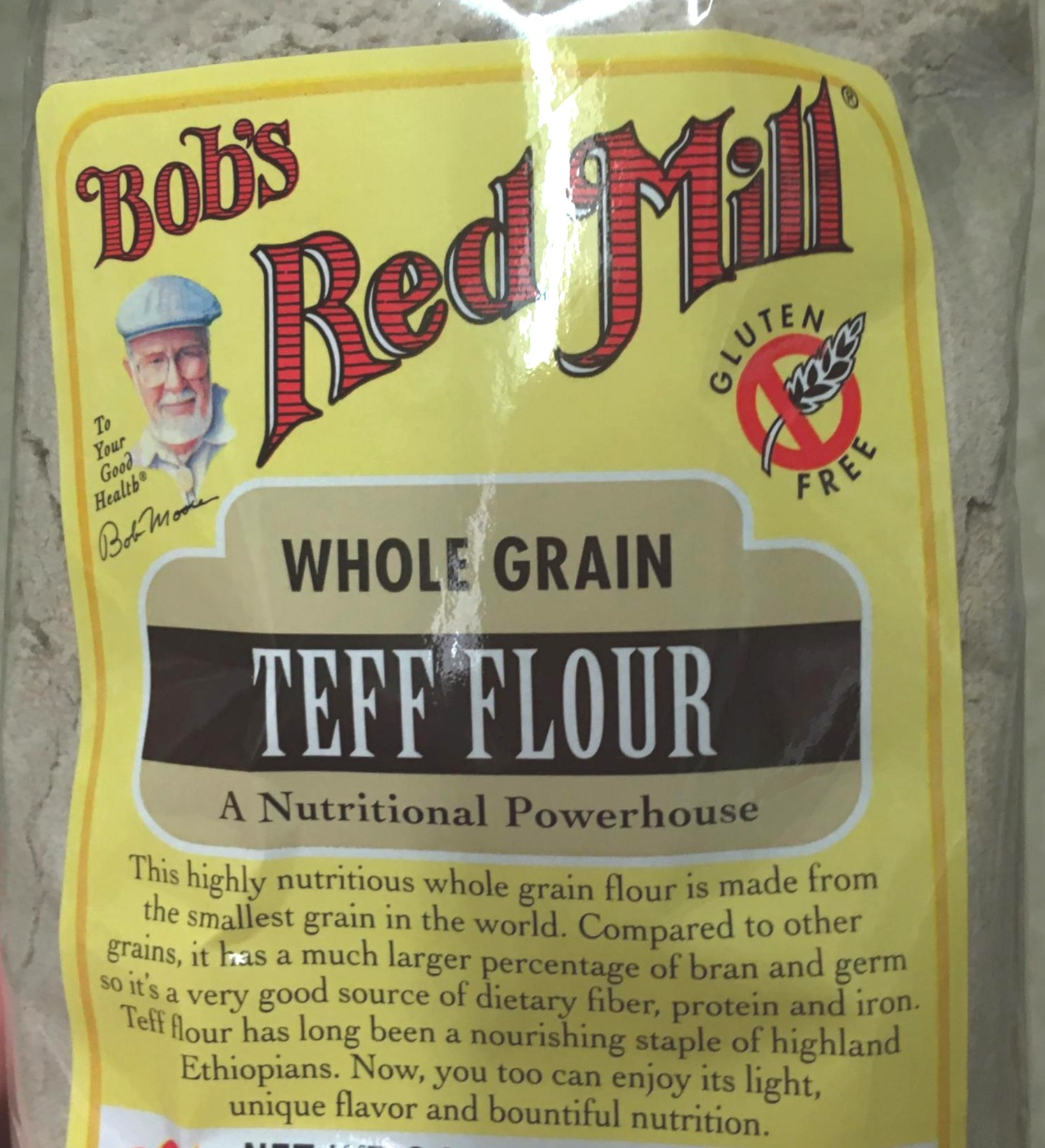
A bag of retail teff flour in USA

Injera became more common in the United States during a spike in Ethiopian immigration in the 1980s and 1990s, largely because of the Refugee Act passed in 1980.

Mass production of injera and its introduction into the US market was pioneered by an Ethiopian-American immigrant, Tedla Desta, who opened the first injera bakery in Alexandria, Virginia. He introduced the seed to Johnston Seed Co. in Enid, Oklahoma, which became his initial supplier.

Teff flour is produced in the United States by several companies, making injera more accessible to immigrant Ethiopians. In America, it is often cooked on an aluminum lefse grill.

== In culture ==
Injera is significant in the culture of Ethiopia. It is seen as a national dish, and a picture of a mesob is on the 10 birr banknote.

Religious and national holidays and events such as weddings and birthdays typically feature injera. During funerals, participants from outside the family carry mesobs full of injera. During graduation parties, guests bring injera and drinks such as tella and areqe. Farmers also share injera with each other to express gratitude for helping with farming.

During Ethiopian Orthodox fast days, for which believers abstain from animal products, injera is often served in a mesob alongside wot, shiro, vegetable dishes, and pasta. Orthodox churchgoers offer injera for the priest to eat after the service. Some Orthodox families in the city of Bahir Dar wrap injera around babies after their baptisms to bring good fortune.

In some parts of the Amhara Region, dreaming about injera is interpreted as a sign of good luck. Among the Amhara from around Bahir Dar, it is believed that a woman who makes good injera is good at managing a household and that a woman who makes injera with good eyes is hard-working like a honeybee.

== See also ==
- Baghrir
- Beyaynetu
- List of African dishes
- List of Ethiopian and Eritrean dishes and foods
