= Mesob =

Basket used to store injera

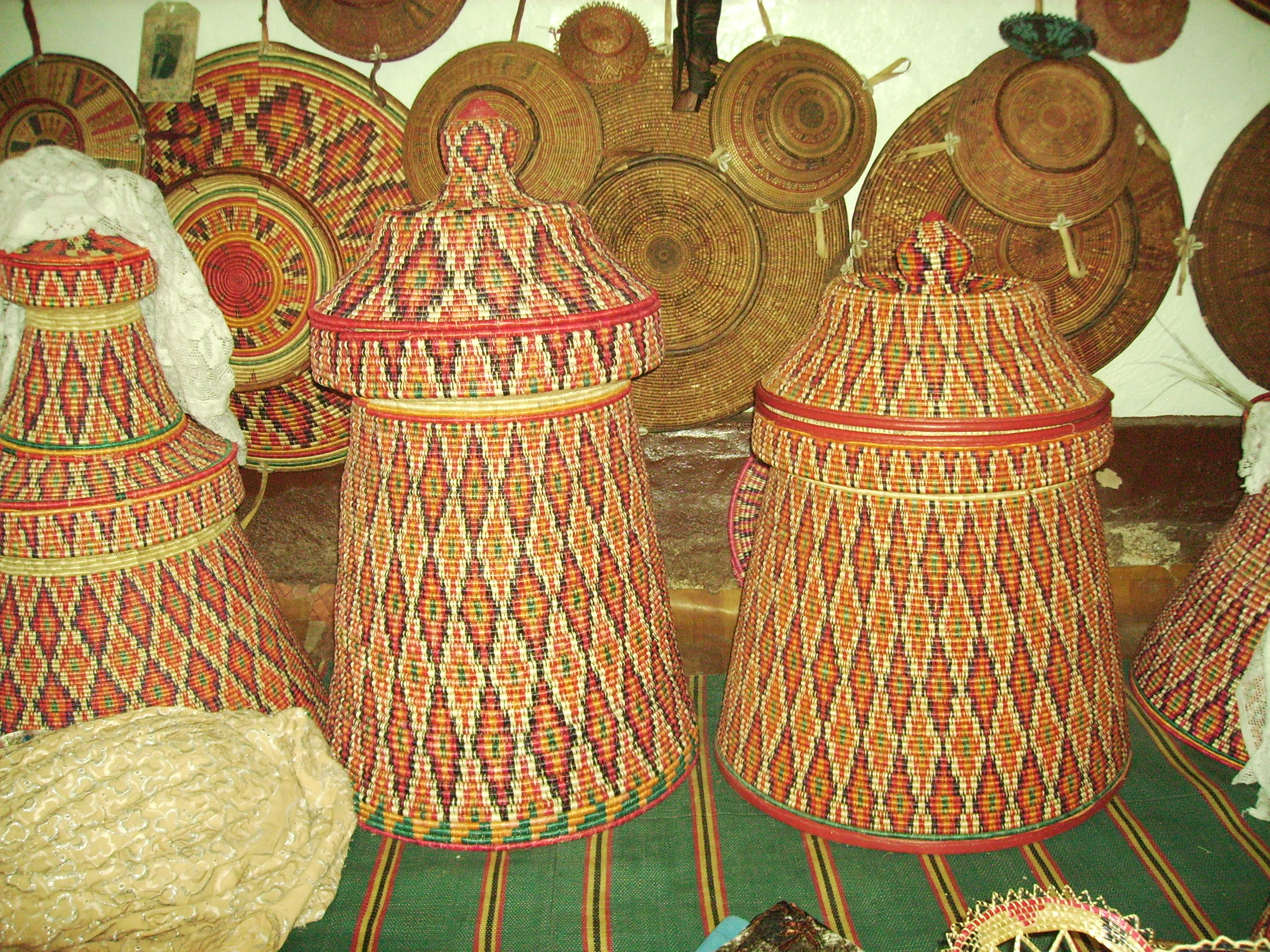
Harari Mesob tables in Jegol

Mesob (Amharic: መሶብ) or Harar mesob is a Harari basket used for storing injera, an Ethiopian and Eritrean flatbread. It is widely depicted as a cultural symbol for Ethiopia, made from locally grown and partially dyed grass and palm leaves known for strength and durability.

== History ==
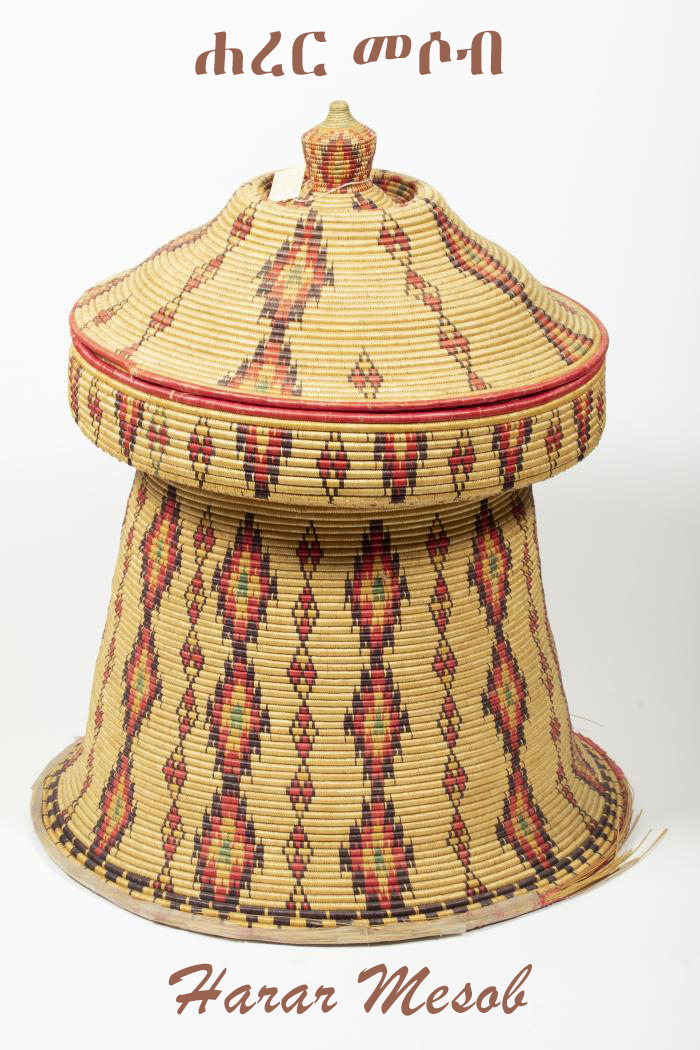
A Harari mesob

In a certain form mesob was identified in Abyssinia as early as the sixteenth century as reported by Portuguese explorer Francisco Álvares; however, the most prominent mesob is of Harar origin. In the mid-1970s Amharas began recruiting Harari artisans to develop a particular mesob which incorporated Abyssinian and Harari designs; this variety came to dominate mesob production in Ethiopia.

== In popular culture ==
Although generally described as Ethiopian, mesob baskets belong to a larger tradition of Harari basketry. A mesob is depicted on the 10 birr note. Mesob baskets are used in funeral ceremonies to support the family of the deceased person and the baskets are widely viewed as a symbolical representation of Ethiopian and Eritrean culture and their cuisine. The Harar mesob is known to be a quality mesob with very complex and prized designs.
