= Injera stove =

Kitchen appliance for baking injera

An Injera stove, also natively called mitad (Amharic: ምጣድ), is a type of kitchen appliance used for baking injera, the traditional flatbread in Ethiopian and Eritrean cuisine. Traditionally, injera has been prepared using open-fire stoves heated with wood, straw, or dung. This has led to extreme deforestation in those regions. To alleviate this problem, injera stoves have been designed that are more efficient and that use alternative fuels, including solar, biomass, and biogas.

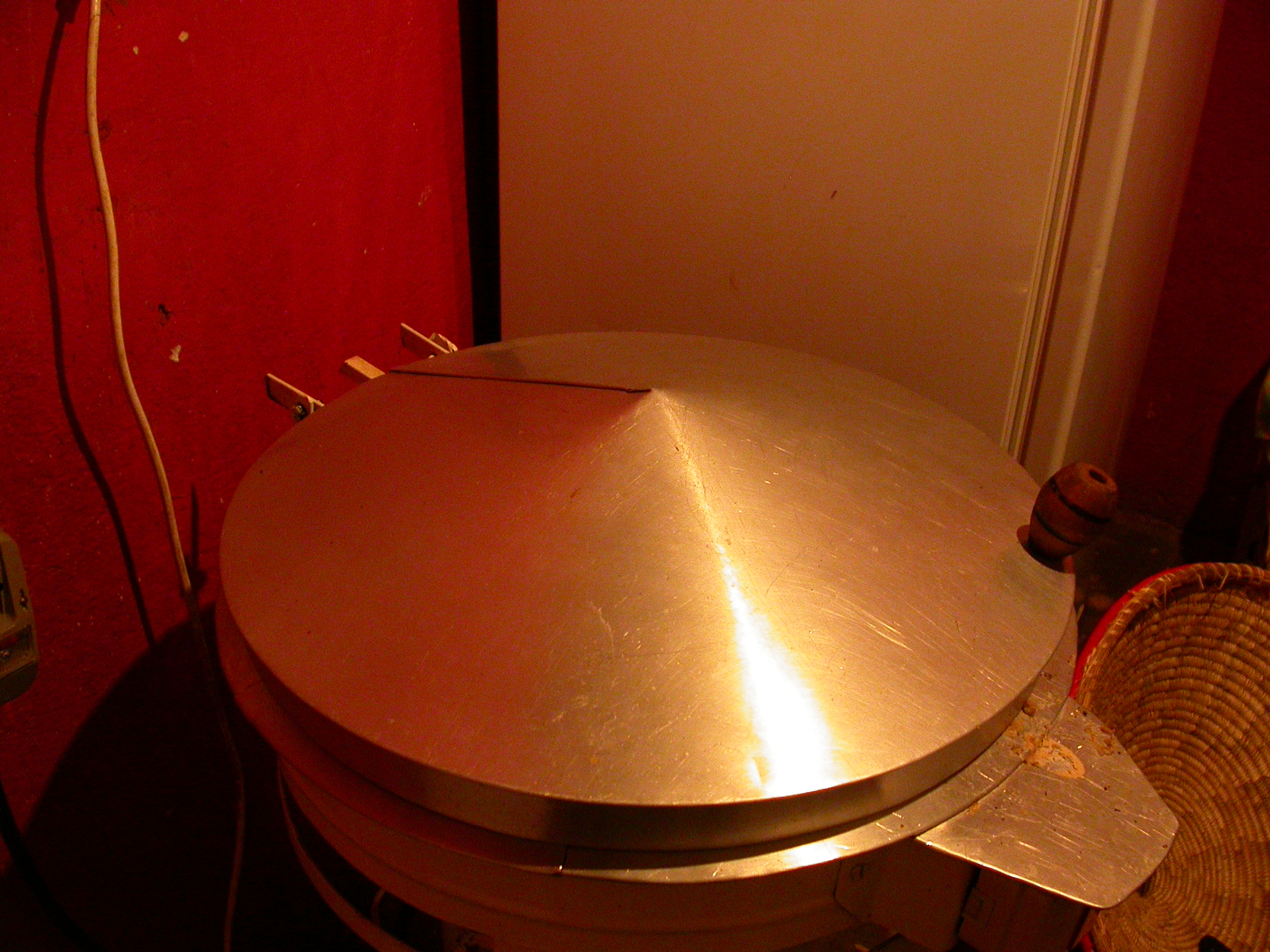
Electric injera stove with lid closed

== Types ==
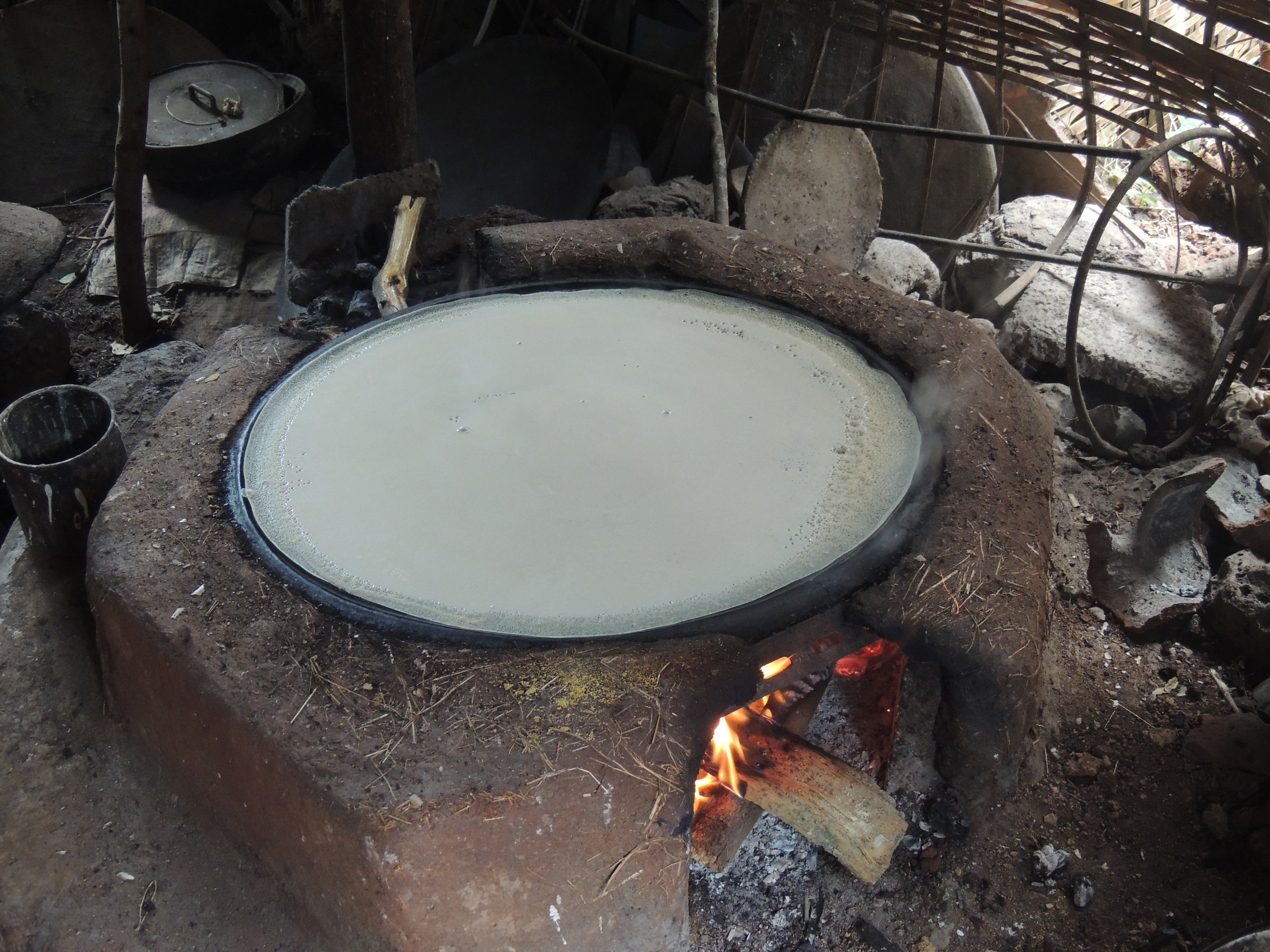
Traditional open wood-burning stove

There are three basic types of stoves used to bake injera: the traditional open wood-burning stove, the improved efficiency wood-burning stove, and the high efficiency electric stove. In most households in Ethiopia, high demand for energy is often met with the use of biomass fuels such as wood, agricultural residue, and dung cakes, whereas electricity is used by some urban households.

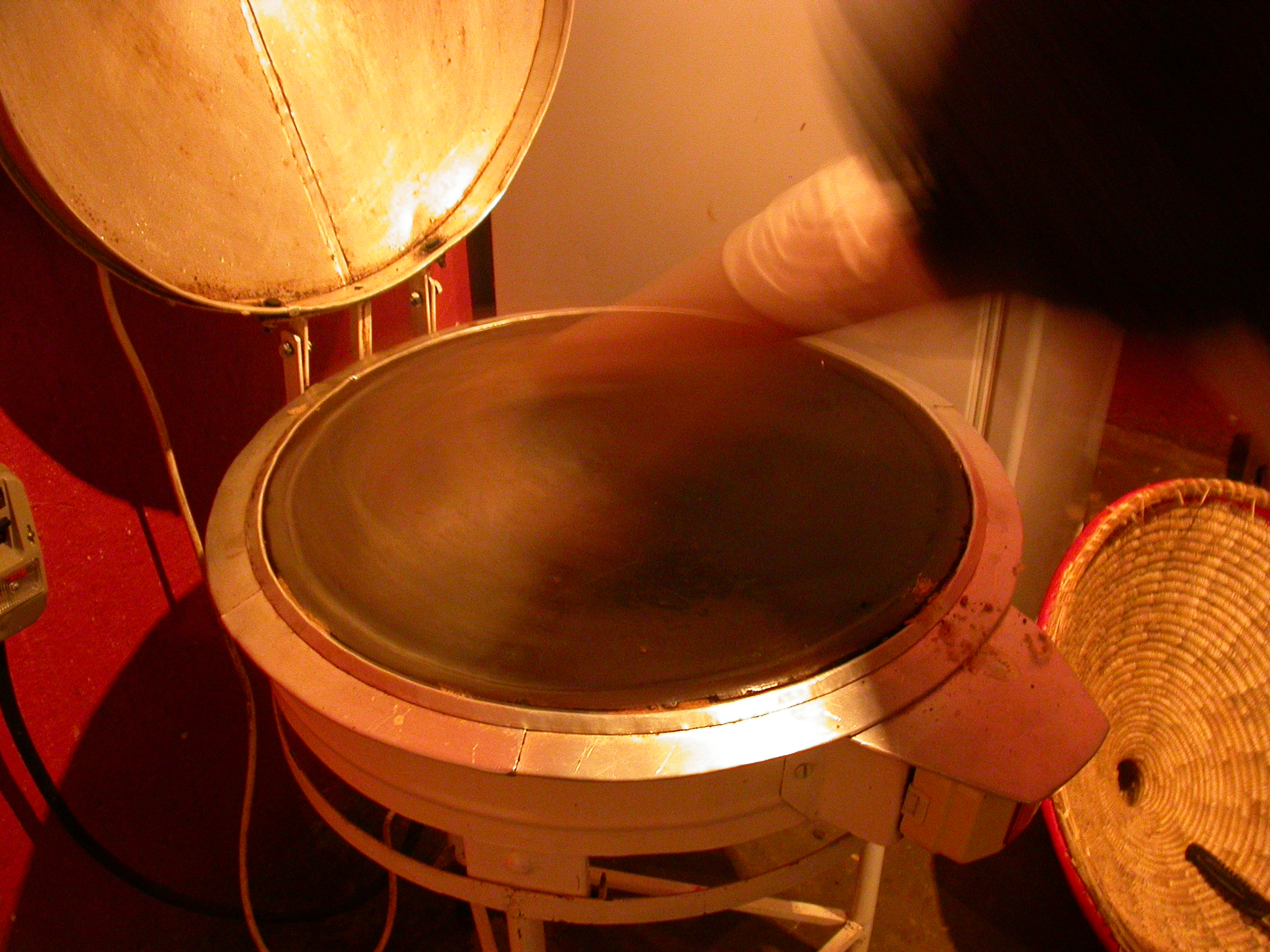
Electric injera stove

In Ethiopia and Eritrea, traditional injera stoves use biomass energy such as the open-fire three-stone stove, the Mirt stove (including the improved type with chimney and stand types) Burayu, Sodo, and Awuramba stoves.

The average specific fuel consumption of the open fire three-stone stove is 929 g/kg of injera, Mirt stove is 535g/kg of injera, Gonziye is 617 g/kg of injera, Awuramba is 573 g/kg of injera while Sodo is 900 g/kg of injera.

=== Solar ===
A solar injera stove uses solar energy to achieve the required surface temperature of the injera baking pan or mitad. Heating may be either direct, by means of a parabolic mirror which concentrates sunlight on the underside of the mitad, or indirect, by focusing the sun's rays on a boiler to generate steam, which can be used to heat the mitad. A parabolic type solar injera baking stove was able to reach 200°C.The average surface temperature of an indirectly heated solar thermal injera stove was found to be 148°C when operated with atmospheric steam.

=== Electric ===
While efficient electric injera stoves are available, even in urban areas, electric power is not widely available and is likely to be intermittent. For those lucky enough to enjoy reliable electric service, it is a viable option. A typical electric injera stove reaches 225 °C using 3.75 KW. The WASS electric injera stove reaches 220°C surface temperature using only 1.4 KW.

=== Biogas ===
A biogas Injera baking stove was tested using a 8.5m^{3} biogas digester. The biogas stove has better specific fuel consumption than that of the traditional "three stone", "Mirt", or "Gonzie" stoves. The biogas stove has a fuel efficiency of 57% and on average can produce 20–25 pieces of injera (500mm) per hour. Subsequently, this alternative method of baking injera from sustainable energy sources contributes to implementation of a national biogas program. A biogas injera stove typically achieves 210°C.

== Temperature ==
The average temperature required to bake injera is 180°C to 220°C, although temperatures as high as 250°C can be used.
