= Fasting and abstinence of the Coptic Orthodox Church =

Coptic Orthodox fasts

The Copts (Christians of Egypt), who belong to the Coptic Orthodox Church, observe fasting periods according to the Coptic calendar. In Coptic Orthodox Christianity, fasting is traditionally defined as going without water and food from midnight to sunset; after that time, the consumption of water and one vegan meal is permitted. The fasting periods of Coptic Christians are exceeded by no other Christian denomination except the Orthodox Tewahedo. Out of the 365 days of the year, Copts often fast between 210 and 240 days. This means that Copts abstain from all animal products for up to two-thirds of each year. Coptic Orthodox fasts have evolved over time to become more lengthy and severe. A lifestyle involving such fasts may have contributed to the pacifist mindset of the Coptic people for centuries. Married couples refrain from sexual relations during Lent "to give themselves time for fasting and prayer".

== Fasting ==
There are spiritual, symbolic, and even practical reasons for fasting. In the fall from Paradise, man became possessed of a carnal nature; he adopted carnal practices. Through fasting, the Oriental Orthodox Christians attempt to recapture Paradise in their lives by refraining from those carnal practices. In general, Coptic fasting means adhering to a vegan diet, thus abstaining from meat, fish, eggs, dairy, and other animal products. Food made of fava beans, lentils, grape leaves, tomatoes, potatoes etc. are consumed during fasting days.

There are those who see fasting as an exercise in self-denial and Christian obedience that serves to rid the believer of his or her passions (what most modern people would call "addictions"). These often low-intensity and hard-to-detect addictions to food, television or other entertainments, sex, or any kind of self-absorbed pleasure-seeking are seen as some of the most significant obstacles for man seeking closeness to God. Through struggling with fasting, the believer comes face to face with the reality of his condition—the starting point for genuine repentance.

All Coptic Christians are expected to fast following a prescribed set of guidelines. In Coptic Christianity, the Black Fast of the early Church is the normative way of fasting, meaning that the believer goes without water and food from midnight to sunset; after that time, the consumption of water and one vegetarian meal is permitted. Dispensation is however granted under special circumstances, such as pregnancy and sickness.

There is no specified age limit for children to start fasting. This is decided by their parents and parish priest. But, children are encouraged to fast from an early age of eight or ten. It is considered a sign of devotion. For children, fasting is seen as a means to develop their "Coptic skills". It introduces them to asceticism, which is integral to the Coptic way of life.

The time and type of fast is generally uniform in Oriental Orthodoxy. The times of fasting are dependent on the ecclesiastical calendar. In the Coptic Orthodox Church, this calendar is the Coptic calendar, which corresponds largely to the calendars of other Christian denominations. Observance of the fasting periods is very strict in the Coptic community.

== Observation periods ==
The major fasting periods during the ecclesiastical calendar year are:

=== The Fast of the Advent ===
The Nativity Fast (Advent or Winter Lent) is the 40 days preceding the Nativity of Jesus (Christmas) on 29 Koiak (January 7, which also falls on 28 Koiak in leap years). The 40 days correspond to the 40 days that Moses fasted on the mountain before receiving the Ten Commandments from God, which were at that time considered the word of God to his people. Thus, with Christ being the Word of God, the Christians fast those 40 days in preparation of receiving the Word of God in flesh at the Feast of the Nativity.

An additional 3 days were added at the beginning of the 40 days of Advent during the 10th century to commemorate the three days that Copts fasted before God awarded them the miracle of moving the Mokattam, which lies within a suburb of Cairo, on the hands of Simon the Tanner during the rule of the Fatimid caliph al-Mu'izz li-Din Allah. Thus the fast of Advent begins on 16 Hathor (November 25, which also falls on 15 Hathor in leap years). The three added days are considered a separate fast rather than part of the fast of Advent.

=== The Fast of Nineveh ===
It commemorates the three days that the people of Nineveh fasted in repentance after Jonah's call for them to repent. For Christians, these three days are a direct parallel of and a prophecy about the three days that Christ spent in the tomb, just like the three days Jonah spent in the belly of the fish. The fast of Nineveh begins on a Monday, three weeks before the Monday that marks the beginning of Great Lent.

This fast was borrowed from Syriac Christianity, as one of the Patriarchs of Alexandria of Syriac descent decided to adapt it for the Church of Alexandria. This fast is also observed by the Armenian Apostolic Church (Arajavorats fast), Ethiopian Orthodox Tewahedo Church and the Church of the East.

=== The Fast of Preparation for Lent ===
There is an additional period of fasting before the beginning of the Great Lent, which serves as a preparatory period, often called the "Pre-Lenten Fast"; this initiates eight continuous weeks of fasting constituting three distinct consecutive fasting periods:

1. the Pre-Lenten Fast leading up to Great Lent;
2. the Fast of Great Lent itself;
3. the Paschal fast during Holy Week which immediately follows Great Lent.

=== The Fast of Great Lent ===
Great Lent lasts 55 days, which includes traditional 40 days that Christ fasted on the mountain, plus a week before for varying reasons and a week after, as penance for Holy Week. It precedes Palm Sunday, and the Holy Week, which precede Easter.

=== The Fast of the Holy Week, Passion Week, and the Holy Pascha ===
This is the week preceding Easter, which climaxes with the Crucifixion on Good Friday and ends with the joyous Easter.

Since they are not related to each other dogmatically, in early Christianity, the fasts of Great Lent and of Holy Week were separate. It was later in Church history that the Fathers of the Church saw it as spiritually beneficial to join them concurrently, and later added the Preparatory week to enable the faithful to prepare themselves spiritually and bodily to experience the benefits of the fasts.

=== The Fast of the Apostles ===
The Apostles' Fast varies in length from two to six weeks (15 to 49 days). It begins on the Monday following the Sunday of Pentecost and extends to the feast day of Saint Peter and Paul the Apostle on 5 Epip (July 12). This fasting period commemorates the struggles of the Apostles to preach Christianity to the world. Its length varies yearly depending on the date of Easter, which in turn determines the date of Pentecost. The people who are fasting are allowed to eat vegan food and fish.

=== The Fast of the Dormition of the Mother of God ===
This fast is fifteen days long and precedes the feast of the Dormition of the Mother of God. This fasting period is fasted to ask for the intercessions of Mary, mother of Jesus. It begins on 1 Mesori (August 7) and ends on 16 Mesori (August 22).

=== Wednesday and Friday Weekly Fasts ===
Coptic Christians also fast every Wednesday in commemoration of Christ's betrayal by Judas Iscariot, and every Friday in commemoration of his crucifixion. Exceptions are the Wednesdays and Fridays between Resurrection and Pentecost (the 50-day period of joy during which fasting is not permitted) and any day whereon a Major Feast falls.

=== The Paramon Fasts ===
The day or days preceding the Feast of the Nativity and the Feast of Theophany is/are a fast day(s) in preparation for the Feast day. (See the rules for the fasting days of the Paramon Fasts)

== Rules ==
=== General dietary rules ===
According to the Coptic tradition of fasting periods, the diet is mainly vegan, cooked with either oil or water. No animal products (meat, poultry, milk, eggs, butter, etc.) are allowed.

==== Permissibles ====
Fish is permissible during the Advent fast, the Apostles' Fast, and the fast of the Dormition of Saint Mary except on Wednesdays and Fridays of these fasts. Lent and the Holy Week fasts are stricter than the other fasts in their discipline. Fish is not permitted during the Great Lent. Those who wish to take a vow of strict discipline for the fast of Saint Mary may also do so.

=== Strict abstinence ===
A strict abstinence period, where no food or drink whatsoever may be taken, is encouraged for those who can endure it. The original tradition of the Church is for this period of abstinence to begin at midnight and last through sunset. Those who cannot endure this length of fast are still encouraged to strictly abstain from all types of food and drink between midnight and a certain time in the day, depending on each individual's strength and spiritual needs (this is usually based on the suggestion of the person's father of confession). For many parishioners, fasting is more likely to end at noon (the hour when Christ was placed on the Cross) or three o'clock in the afternoon (the hour when Christ died on the Cross). Strict abstinence is also expected to be kept on Great Friday between midnight and the end of the Great Friday prayers (usually around 6pm).

=== Regarding the Fast of the Paramon of the Feasts of the Nativity and of Theophany ===
- The Paramon Fast is a strict fasting day with abstinence and no fish preceding the Nativity or Theophany Feast.
- If the Feast day falls on Tuesday, Wednesday, Thursday or Saturday, then the Paramon is simply the day immediately preceding the Feast day.
- If the Feast day falls on a Sunday, the Paramon abstinence day is substituted by the Friday before, since Saturday is a non-abstaining day. In this case, the Paramon Fast is considered as the two days, Friday and Saturday, with only Friday as a Paramon abstinence day.
- If the Feast day falls on a Monday, then the Paramon abstinence day is similarly substituted with the Friday before, since Saturday and Sunday are non-abstaining days. In this case, the Paramon Fast is considered as the three days, Friday, Saturday and Sunday, with only Friday as a Paramon abstinence day. This is the only case where a third previous day is included in the Paramon Fast.
- If the Feast day falls on Friday, then the Paramon Fast becomes a two-day fast since Wednesday is already a strict fasting day with abstinence.

=== Non-fasting periods ===
There are 7 weeks during the year where there is no fasting even on Wednesday and Friday. These are the 7 weeks between Easter and Pentecost. These 7 weeks are fast-free because this period is a period of joy for Christians in celebration of the Resurrection of Christ.

=== Abstinence Fasting observance before partaking of the Holy Communion ===
Coptic Orthodox Christians who expect to receive communion of the Eucharist on a certain day do not eat or drink at all during the nine hours preceding the partaking of the communion or from midnight of the previous night, whichever is longer.

=== Canonical observance ===
Strict fasting with abstinence is canonically forbidden on Saturdays and Sundays due to the festal character of the Sabbath and Resurrectional observances respectively. Holy (Bright) Saturday is the only Saturday of the year where a strict fast is kept.

=== Principle of piety ===
It is considered worse to advertise one's fasting than to not participate in the fast. Fasting is a purely personal communication between the Orthodox Christian and God, and in fact, has no place whatsoever in the public life of the Coptic Orthodox Church.

== Exceptions ==
These strict fasting rules are usually relaxed by priests on an individual basis to accommodate for illness or weakness. The Coptic Orthodox fasting periods are designed to foster spiritual development and focus on liturgical practices.

Fasting is not generally viewed as a hardship, but rather a privilege and joy in preparing for the coming "Feast Day".

== See also ==
- Eastern Orthodoxy (Fasting)
- Coptic Orthodox Church
- Christian vegetarianism
