= Beyaynetu =

Ethiopian meal

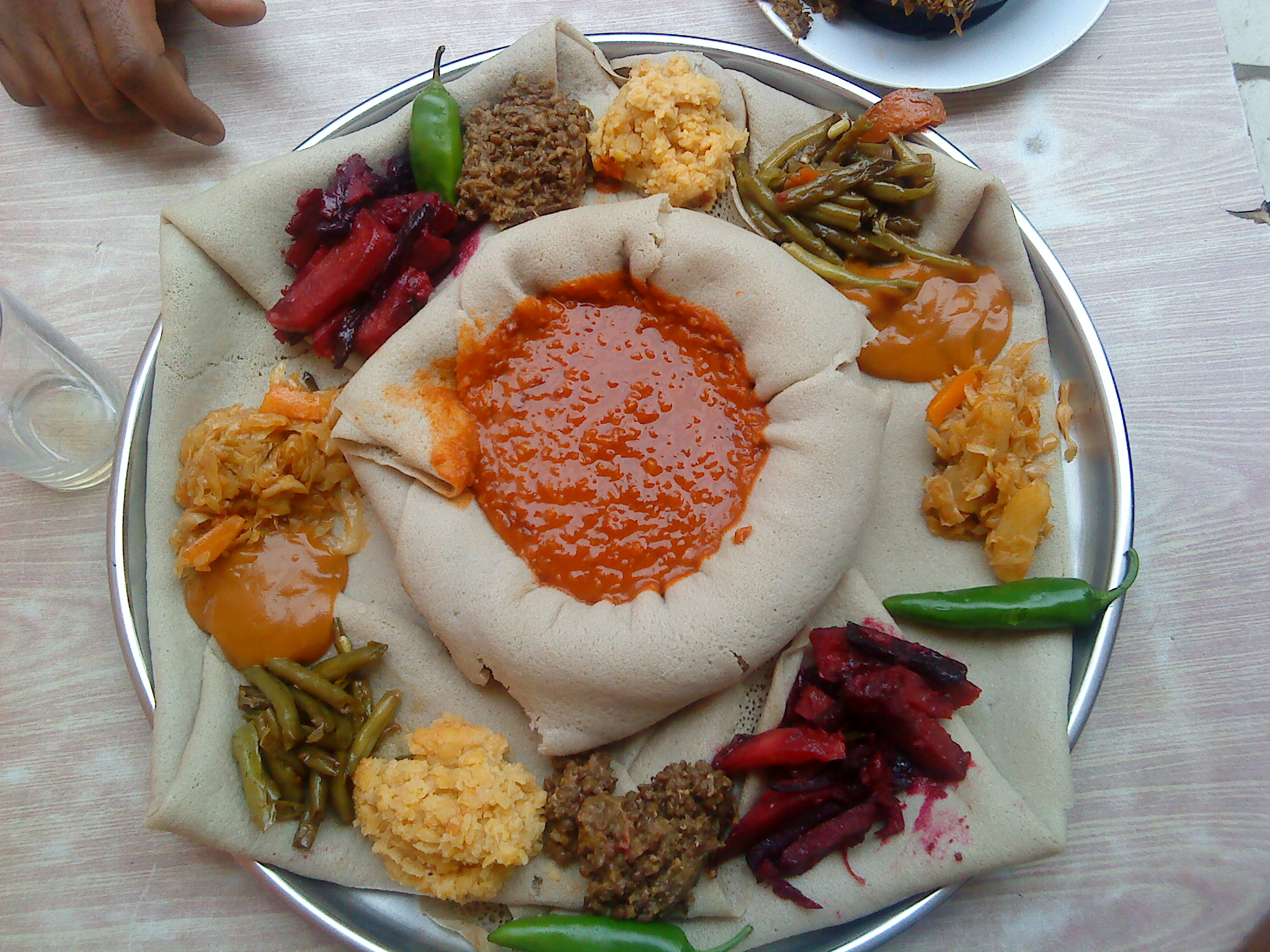
Bäyaynätu

Beyaynetu (Amharic: በያይነቱ, romanized: bäyaynätu) is an Ethiopian/Eritrean dish, often enjoyed as a hearty meal. It combines injera—a sourdough flatbread—with a variety of ingredients, including meat and vegetables. One of the national dishes of Ethiopia, it reflects the diverse flavours of the country's cuisine.

The term bäyaynätu (በያይነቱ) in Amharic can be translated as "various" or "assorted", indicating the wide range of ingredients, that make up this dish.

== Varieties ==
- Vegetarian: The vegetable-only style is known as ʾätkəlt bäyaynätu (አትክልት በያይነቱ) or yetsom bäyaynätu (የጾም በያይነቱ). Here, ʾätkəlt refers to "plants" or "vegetables", and yetsom signifies "fasting", denoting the period when members of the Ethiopian Orthodox Tewahedo Church abstain from consuming meat and dairy products for several weeks. The prefix yä functions as a genitive marker, combined with tsom ("fasting") to denote "of fasting".
- Non-vegetarian: When meat is included, it goes by names such as bäyaynätu bäsga (በያይነቱ በስጋ) or yäfsək bäyaynätu (የፍስክ በያይነቱ). In this context, bä means "with", and səga stands for "meat". Yäfsək is associated with the non-fasting period fsək in the Ethiopian Orthodox Tewahedo Church.

== See also ==
- Banchan
- Kamayan
- Meze
- Rijsttafel
- Smorgasbord
- Tapas
- Thali
