= Fasting and abstinence in the Ethiopian Orthodox Tewahedo Church =

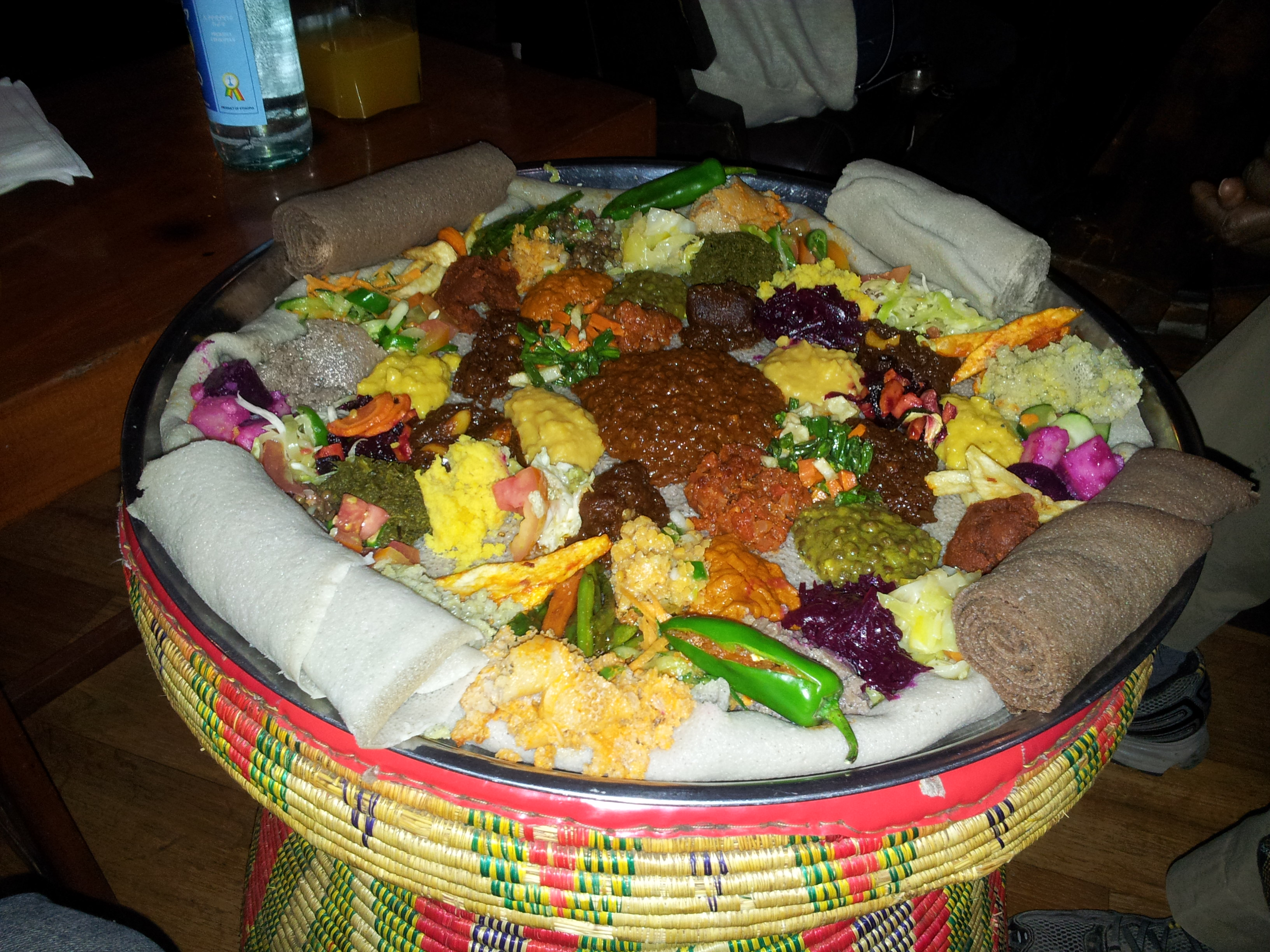
A vegan Ethiopian yetsom bäyaynätu, compatible with fasting rules.

Fasting and abstinence (Ge'ez: ጾም ṣōm; Amharic and Tigrinya: tsom) have historically constituted a major element of the practice of the Ethiopian Orthodox Tewahedo Church, following the counsel of Saint Paul (Ge'ez: ቅዱስ ጳውሎስ; k’idus p’awilos) to "chastise the body and bring it under subjection" per 1 Corinthians 9:27. It is generally agreed, and asserted by the Church itself, that the fasting regime of the Ethiopian Church is the strictest of any Church, with 180 mandatory fasting days for laypeople and up to 252 days for clergy and the particularly observant. The general list of fasts are laid out in the Fetha Negest.

== Fasting regimen ==
During fasts, the observant are required to partake in no more than one meal a day, which is to be eaten in the afternoon or evening. Fasting involves abstention from animal products (meat, dairy, and eggs), and refraining from eating or drinking before 3:00 pm. Ethiopian devotees may also abstain from sexual activity and the consumption of alcohol.

=== Foods ===
As the fasting regimen prohibits the consumption of meat, dairy, and eggs, Ethiopian cuisine contains many dishes that can be considered vegan. Legumes such as split peas (ክክ, kək or kikki) and lentils (ምስር, məsər or birsin); or vegetables such as potatoes (ድንች, Dənəch), carrots and chard (ቆስጣ) are common in fasting dishes. Shiro wat (Amharic: ሽሮ ወጥ), made from ground chickpeas, is also particularly popular as a fasting food.

As international cuisines have grown in popularity among the Ethiopian middle class, fasting variants have also developed to meet the needs of the observant population—among which include fasting pizza, fasting pasta, fasting pastries, and fasting (meatless) burgers. Another example of Western influence is the popularity of fish goulash (Amharic: አሣ ጉላሽ; asa gulaš), often made with local Nile perch, tilapia, or catfish.

=== Observance ===
Observance of the fasting periods have fluctuated with time. Today, religious groups like Mahibere Kidusan encourage the faithful to rigorously observe both obligatory and optional fasting periods. As a result, strict observance of fasts is said to be growing in certain Orthodox communities.

== List of fasts ==
=== Ordinary fasts ===
Every Wednesday and Friday throughout the year are observed as fast days except during the fifty days after Easter, Wednesday in observance of the decision of the Sanhedrin, in collaboration with Judas Iscariot, to betray and kill Jesus before the feast of Pesach, and Friday in observance of the Passion of Jesus.

=== Seven Official Canonical Fasts ===
Fasts are observed on the following occasions:

- The Fast of Great Lent (Ge'ez: ዐብይ ጾም; ābiyi ts’om) lasts for eight weeks (rather than five, as in the Chalcedonian churches), or 55 continuous days before Easter (Fasika). The fast is divided into three separate periods: Tsome Hirkal, eight days commemorating the fast requested by the Byzantine Emperor Heraclius before he set out to fight the Persians and recover the Cross of Christ which they had seized and taken from Jerusalem; Tsome Arba, the 40 days of Lent; and Tsome Himamat, seven days commemorating Holy Week.
- The Apostles' Fast follows the Sacred Tradition of the Apostles prior to their evangelism where, as part of their preparation, they began a fast with prayer to ask God to strengthen their resolve and to be with them in their missionary undertakings. It begins the Monday following Pentecost and ends on the 4th of Hamle (Coptic Epip, corresponding to Gregorian 26 June); as the date of Pentecost is set relative to that of Easter, the duration of the fast varies between 10 and 40 days.
- The Fast of Assumption of the Holy Virgin, 15 days.
- The Fast of the Prophets Advent Fast, 40 days. It begins with Sibket on 15th Hedar and ends on Christmas Eve with the feast of Gena and the 28th of Tahsas.
- The Fast of (gahad)/ If Christmas or Timket (Theophany) fall on a Wednesday or a Friday, then the obligatory Wednesday/Friday fast is observed on the eve (Tuesday or Thursday). As Christmas Eve is generally a fasting day anyway, this is only has effect of forbidding fasting on Christmas even if it's a Wednesday or Friday.
- The Fast of Nineveh, commemorating the preaching of Jonah. It comes on Monday, Tuesday and Wednesday of the third week before Lent.
- The Fast of Wednesdays and Fridays/ In observance of the Wednesday decision by the Sanhedrin to seize Christ, and the Friday Crucifixion, all Wednesdays and Fridays are considered obligatory fasting days (except during the 50 days after Easter, and the feasts of Christmas and Theophany (Timket) if they should fall on these days of the week).

=== Optional fasts ===
Many faithful also observe optional fasts that are not included in the official and canonical list of mandatory fasts. These include ጽጌ ጾም (tsege tsom; the Fast of the Flowers) which commemorates the exile of the Holy Family in Egypt, and the fast of Puagumen (Ethiopia's thirteenth month of 5 days or 6 days in leap years) in preparation for Ethiopian New Year on Meskerem 1.

== See also ==
- Fasting and abstinence of the Coptic Orthodox Church of Alexandria
- Ethiopian cuisine
