= Ethiopian Jewish cuisine =

Cuisine of the Beta Israel (Ethiopian Jews)

Ethiopian Jewish cuisine is the cuisine of the Beta Israel (Ethiopian Jews). The cuisine of the Ethiopian Jews is similar to the cuisine of other Ethiopians, with some variations.

Because treyf foods such as pork and shellfish are not traditionally eaten by either Ethiopian Christians or Ethiopian Muslims, keeping kosher in Ethiopia is a largely invisible practice. However, there are some noticeable distinctions. Ethiopian Jews refrain from eating popular national dishes made from raw meat, such as kitfo and gored gored. Jewish merchants in Addis Ababa five centuries ago deeply influenced Ethiopian cuisine by introducing curry powder and other aspects of Indian cooking.

== Ethiopian Kashrut ==
Ethiopian-Jewish dietary laws are based mainly on Leviticus, Deuteronomy and Jubilees.

Permitted and forbidden animals and their signs appear on Leviticus 11:3–8 and Deuteronomy 14:4–8. Forbidden birds are listed on Leviticus 11:13–23 and Deuteronomy 14:12–20. Signs of permitted fish are written on Leviticus 11:9–12 and Deuteronomy 14:9–10. Insects and larvae are forbidden according to Leviticus 11:41–42. Birds of prey are forbidden according to Leviticus 11:13–19.

Gid hanasheh is forbidden per Genesis 32:33. Mixtures of milk and meat are neither prepared nor eaten, but are not banned either: Haymanot interpreted the verses Exodus 23:19, Exodus 34:26 and Deuteronomy 14:21 literally "shalt not seethe a kid in its mother's milk" (like the Karaites). Currently, under Rabbinic influence, mixing dairy products with meat is prohibited.

Ethiopian Jews were forbidden to eat the food of non-Jews. A kes only eats meat he has slaughtered himself, which his hosts then prepare both for him and themselves.

Beta Israel who broke these taboos were ostracized and had to undergo a purification process. Purification included fasting for one or more days, eating only uncooked chickpeas provided by the kes, and ritual purification before entering the village. Unlike other Ethiopians, the Beta Israel do not eat raw meat dishes such as kitfo or gored gored.

Ghee and niter kibbeh (types of clarified butter) are popular components of Ethiopian cuisine, including Ethiopian-Jewish cuisine. To avoid mixtures of meat and dairy, oil can be used as a parev substitute for clarified butter.

Because excess moisture is removed from ghee through heat treatment, the heating equipment must be verified as kosher as well, which adds an extra step to the kashering process. Ghee is commonly used in Middle Eastern cuisine and thus kosher ghee is widely available in Israel. Yeqimem zeyet is a form of niter kibbeh made from vegetable oil and is useful as a parev and vegan alternative to dairy-based niter kibbeh.

Camel meat is traditionally eaten by Ethiopian Muslims, but it is not eaten by either Ethiopian Jews or Ethiopian Christians. Camels are not a kosher animal. Camel milk is commonly consumed in Ethiopia, but is not consumed by Ethiopian Jews because it is not kosher (kosher milk must come from kosher animals).

== Shabbat dishes ==
Shabbat is known as Sanbat in the Amharic and Tigrinya languages.

Sanbat Wat (Sabbath Wat) is a traditional Ethiopian-Jewish wat that is prepared for Shabbat. Sanbat Wat is a doro wat of chicken and hard-boiled eggs served with injera. Sanbat Wat is a spicy dish and is commonly seasoned with berbere, cloves, onions, tomato sauce, and other savory ingredients. Wats made from chicken, meat, and fish are most commonly eaten for Shabbat dinner while vegetarian wats are eaten for breakfast.

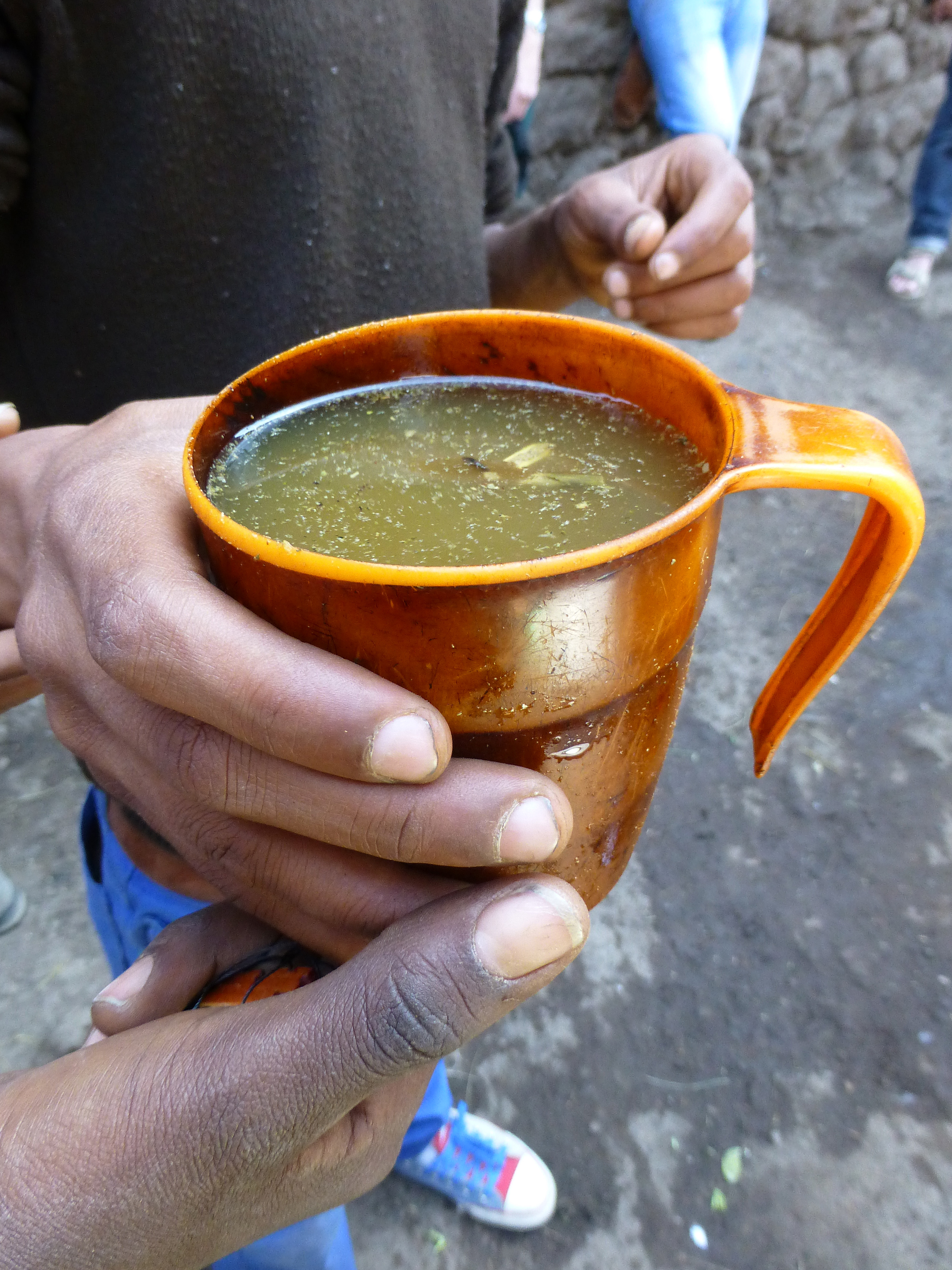
Tallah, a fermented beer used instead of wine for kiddush

Dabos, small round rolls, are traditionally served during Shabbat meals. Because Ethiopian Jews usually lacked wine for kiddush, tallah (a beer fermented from gesho leaves) was often used as a substitute. Due to the availability of wine in Israel, Ethiopian-Israelis generally use wine for kiddush.

Because Ethiopian Jews traditionally interpret halakhic prohibitions against cooking on Shabbat literally, no heating of food is done on Shabbat. All foods are prepared on Erev Shabbat (Friday) and served room temperature.

Ethiopian Jews who are Shomer Shabbat cannot perform buna, the traditional Ethiopian coffee ceremony, during Shabbat. Buna requires lighting a fire and thus the ceremony must be performed before or after Shabbat.

== Holiday foods ==
=== Passover ===
Ethiopian matzah is baked as a circular flatbread 2 feet in diameter, with a soft texture like pita.

While most Jews stopped the practice of the Passover sacrifice after the destruction of the Second Temple, some Ethiopian Jews still continue the practice.

=== Rosh Hashanah ===
Rosh Hashanah is known as Brenha Serkan in Amharic, meaning "the rising of the dawn." Ethiopian Jews traditionally only observed Rosh Hashanah for one day, as opposed to the two days usually observed by Jews elsewhere in the diaspora and in Israel.

Lamb, the most expensive meat available in Ethiopia, was served for the holiday. It was customary for affluent members of the community to hold a community feast for the holiday and invite other members of the community to join.

=== Sigd ===
Ethiopian Jews fast for the holiday of Sigd. To break the fast, it is traditional to eat a lamb or chicken stew served with eggs and potatoes.

Since meat can be scarce in Ethiopia, Ethiopian Jews usually only eat meat-based stews once a week for Shabbat, and for holidays.

== Ethiopian-Jewish restaurants ==
There are few kosher Ethiopian-Jewish restaurants worldwide, even in Israel. However, more kosher Ethiopian restaurants have opened in Israel over time. Several kosher Ethiopian restaurants have opened in Jerusalem and Tel Aviv. A kosher vegan Ethiopian restaurant exists in Tel Aviv.

In Harlem, the Tsion Cafe, formerly non-kosher, serves kosher Ethiopian-Jewish/Ethiopian-Israeli inspired cuisine. A kosher vegan Ethiopian restaurant was opened in Brooklyn in March 2020, certified with the "Mason Jar K" hechsher under the superversion of Rabbi Sam Reinstein of Congregation Kol Israel.

As of 2019, there are no kosher restaurants in Addis Ababa. However, the Chabad house in Addis Ababa offers kosher food.

== See also ==
- Cuisine of the Mizrahi Jews
- Cuisine of the Sephardic Jews
- Ethiopian cuisine
- Israeli cuisine
- Jewish cuisine
- Jewish dietary laws
- Kosher foods
