= International rankings of Ethiopia =

The following are international rankings of Ethiopia.

== Economy ==
- World Economic Forum 2019 Global Competitiveness Report ranked 126 out of 141 economies

== Geography ==
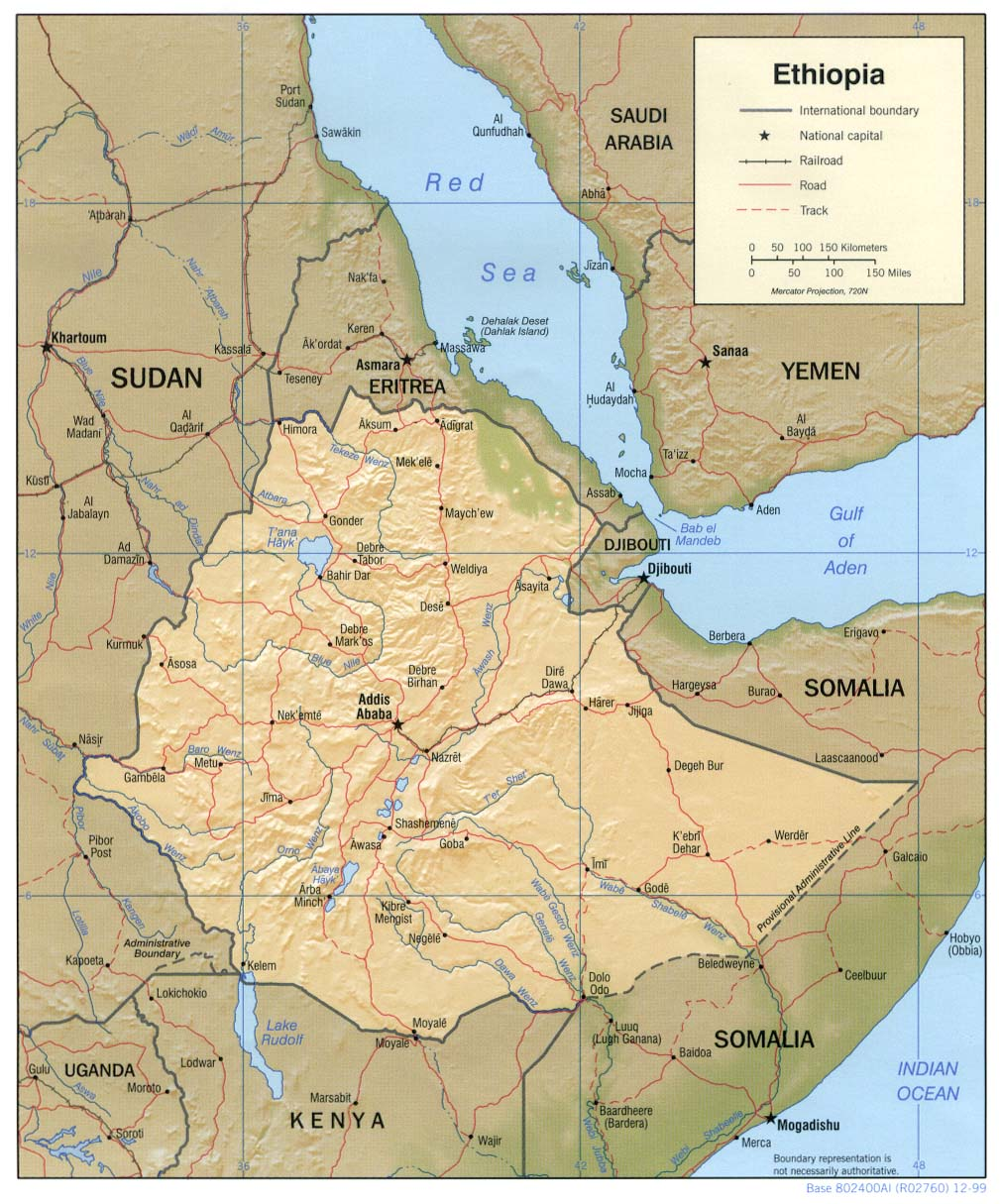
Location of Ethiopia in the Horn of Africa.

At 1,126,829 square kilometres (435,071 sq mi), Ethiopia is the world's 27th-largest country. It is bordered by Eritrea to the north and northeast, Djibouti and Somalia to the east, Sudan and South Sudan to the west, and Kenya to the south.

== Military ==
- Institute for Economics and Peace: Global Peace Index 2009, ranked 128 out of 144

== Politics ==
- Transparency International 2019 Corruption Perceptions Index, ranked 96 out of 179
- Reporters Without Borders 2020 Press Freedom Index, ranked 99 out of 180 countries
- World Justice Project Rule of Law Index 2019, ranked 118 out of 126 countries

== Society ==
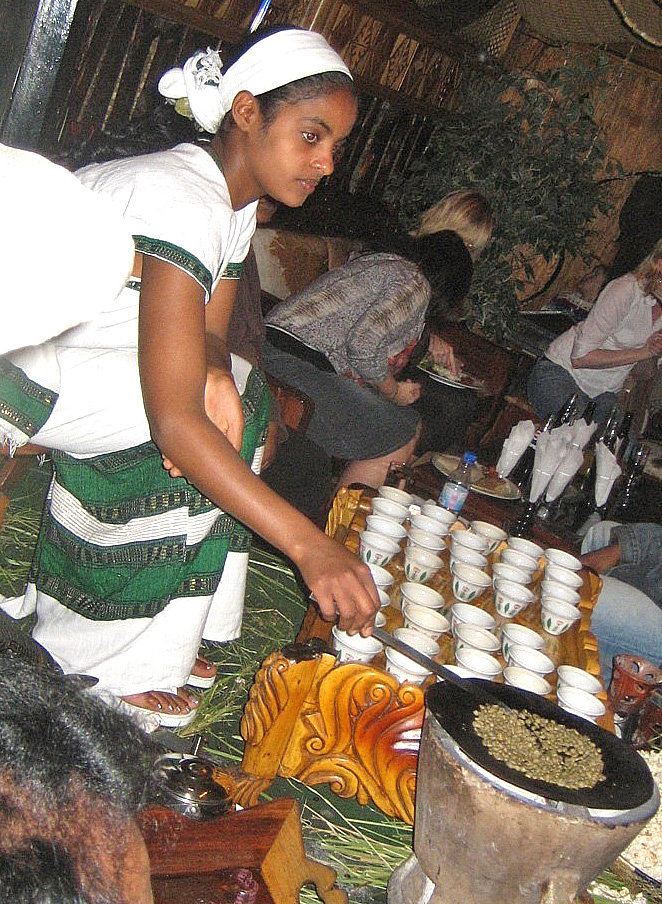
An Ethiopian woman roasting, crushing, and brewing Ethiopian coffee at a traditional ceremony

- United Nations Development Programme 2019 Human Development Index ranked 173 out of 189 countries
- Homicide rate ranked 5 out of 230 territories

== Technology ==
- World Intellectual Property Organization: Global Innovation Index 2026, ranked 133 out of 139 countries

== See also ==
- International rankings of Eritrea
