= Ethiopian cuisine =

Culinary tradition

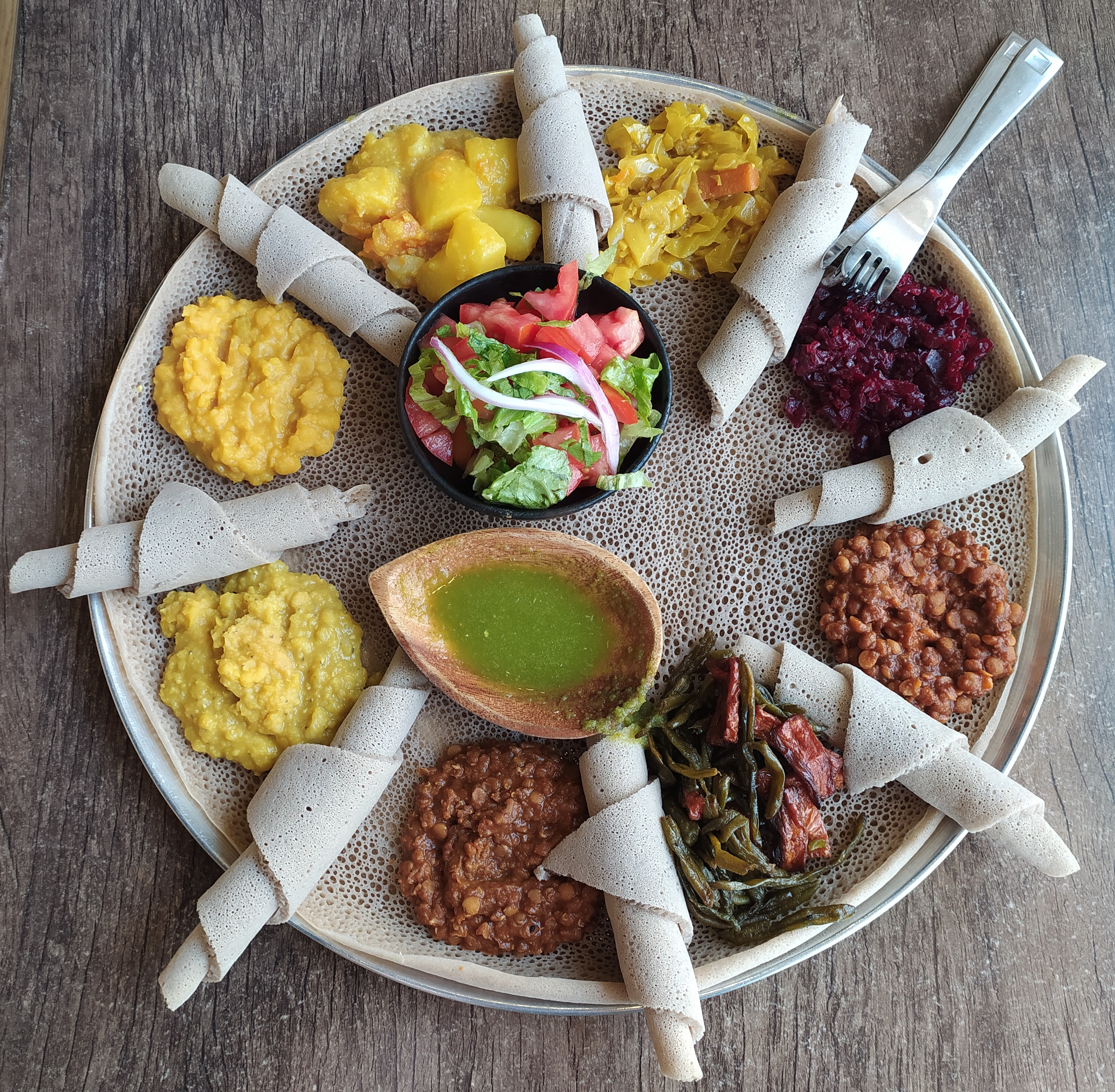
Bäyaynätu (Amharic: በያይነቱ, romanized: bäyaynätu): this meal consisting of injera and several kinds of wat (stew) is typical of Ethiopian cuisine.

Location of Ethiopia

Ethiopian cuisine (Amharic: የኢትዮጵያ ምግብ, Ye-Ītyōṗṗyā məgəb) characteristically consists of vegetable and often very spicy meat dishes. This is usually in the form of wat, a thick stew, served on top of injera (እንጀራ), a large sourdough flatbread, which is about 50 centimeters (20 inches) in diameter and made out of fermented teff flour. Ethiopians usually eat with their right hands, using pieces of injera to pick up bites of entrées and side dishes.

The Ethiopian Orthodox Tewahedo Church prescribes a number of fasting periods known as tsom (Ge'ez: ጾም, ṣōm), including all Wednesdays and Fridays and the whole Lenten season (including fifteen days outside Lent proper). Per Oriental Orthodox tradition, the faithful may not consume any kind of animal products (including dairy products and eggs) during fasts; therefore, Ethiopian cuisine contains many dishes that are vegan.

== Overview ==
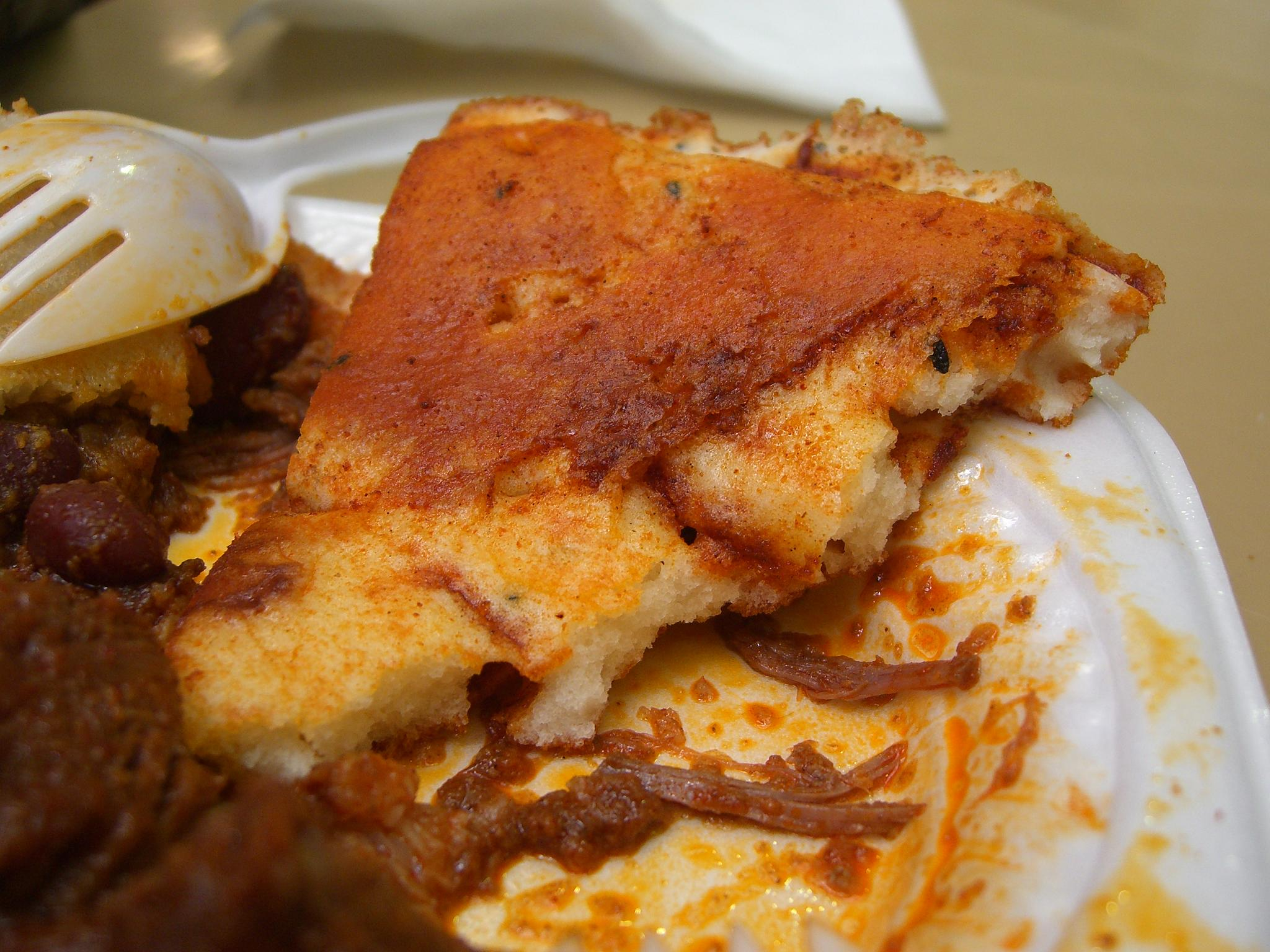
Ethiopian kita herb bread

A typical dish consists of injera accompanied by a spicy stew, which frequently includes beef, lamb, vegetables and various types of legumes (such as lentils), and is traditionally consumed on the mesob basket. The cuisines of the South Ethiopia Regional State, South West Ethiopia Peoples' Region, Central Ethiopia Regional State, and the Sidama region also make use of the false banana plant (enset; Ge'ez: እንሰት, ïnset), a type of ensete. The plant is pulverized and fermented to make various foods, including a bread-like food called kocho (Ge'ez: ቆጮ, qoćo), which is eaten with kitfo. The root of this plant may be powdered and prepared as a hot drink called bulla (Ge'ez: ቡላ, būlā), which is often given to those who are tired or ill. Another typical Gurage preparation is coffee with butter (kebbeh). Kita herb bread is also baked. Quanta (or quwanta), is an air-dried beef jerky with traditional spices; it is eaten on its own as a snack, or as an ingredient in stews and other dishes.

Due in part to the brief Italian occupation, pasta is popular and frequently available throughout Ethiopia, including rural areas. Coffee is also a large part of Ethiopian culture and cuisine. After every meal, a coffee ceremony is enacted and coffee is served.

== History ==
The history of Ethiopian cuisine is influenced by the agricultural heritage of the nation. A key component of tradition is injera – a tangy and soft flatbread crafted from teff, an ancient grain native to Ethiopia. In dining settings, injera is commonly paired with an assortment of wot dishes featuring vegetables, legumes, and meat; one type, doro wot, a spicy chicken stew accentuated with berbere, a spice blend comprising chili peppers, garlic, ginger, and an array of spices, is the national dish of Ethiopia.

Throughout history, Ethiopian cuisine has developed through connections and trading with other nations, along with religious practices. For example, the enduring Christian beliefs in Ethiopia have impacted the development of plant-based meals due to fasting periods that forbid eating meat. Likewise, Islamic customs have influenced meat dishes during some celebrations like Eid.

Ethiopian food has been influenced by the country’s geography and its rich agricultural resources, such as lentils, beans, coffee, and various spices. The customary Ethiopian coffee ritual entails roasting, brewing, and serving coffee with great importance, as it is thought to have originated in Ethiopia. Ethiopian cuisine goes beyond mere nourishment, playing a key role in communal dining and cultural representation.

== Restrictions of certain meats ==
Ethiopian Orthodox Christians avoid pork for cultural reasons as well as religious reasons, while Ethiopian Jews and Ethiopian Muslims avoid eating pork or shellfish for religious reasons; pork is forbidden in Judaism and Islam. Most Ethiopian Protestants or P'ent'ay also abstain from eating food that the Orthodox abstain from. Many Ethiopians abstain from eating certain meats, eating mostly vegetarian foods, partially from the religious fasting period.

== Traditional ingredients ==
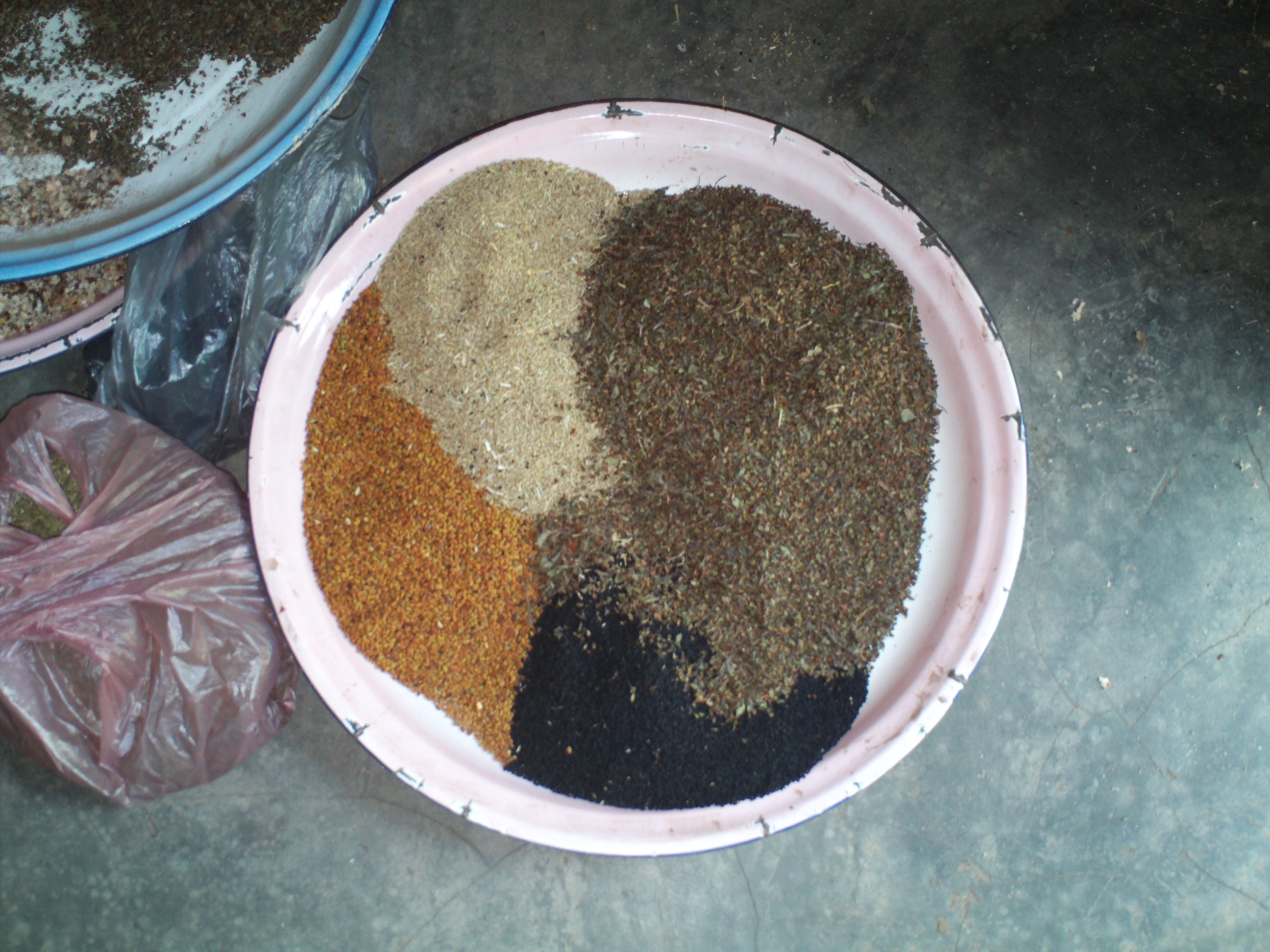
Ajwain or radhuni, korarima, nigella and fenugreek (clockwise, from top) are used with chilis and salt to make berbere (Amharic: በርበሬ), a basic ingredient in many Ethiopian dishes.

Berbere, a combination of powdered chili pepper and other spices (cardamom, fenugreek, coriander, cloves, ginger, nutmeg, cumin and allspice) is an important ingredient used to add flavor to many varied dishes like chicken stews and baked fish dishes. Also essential is niter kibbeh, a clarified butter infused with ginger, garlic, and several spices.

Mitmita (Amharic: ሚጥሚጣ, IPA: [mitʼmitʼa]) is a powdered seasoning mix used in Ethiopian cuisine. It is orange-red in color and contains ground birdseye chili peppers (piri-piri), cardamom seed, cloves and salt. It occasionally contains other spices including cinnamon, cumin and ginger.

In their adherence to strict fasting, Ethiopian cooks have developed a rich array of cooking oil sources—besides sesame and safflower—for use as a substitute for animal fats which are forbidden during fasting periods. Ethiopian cuisine also uses nug (also spelled noog, also known as "niger seed").

== Dishes ==
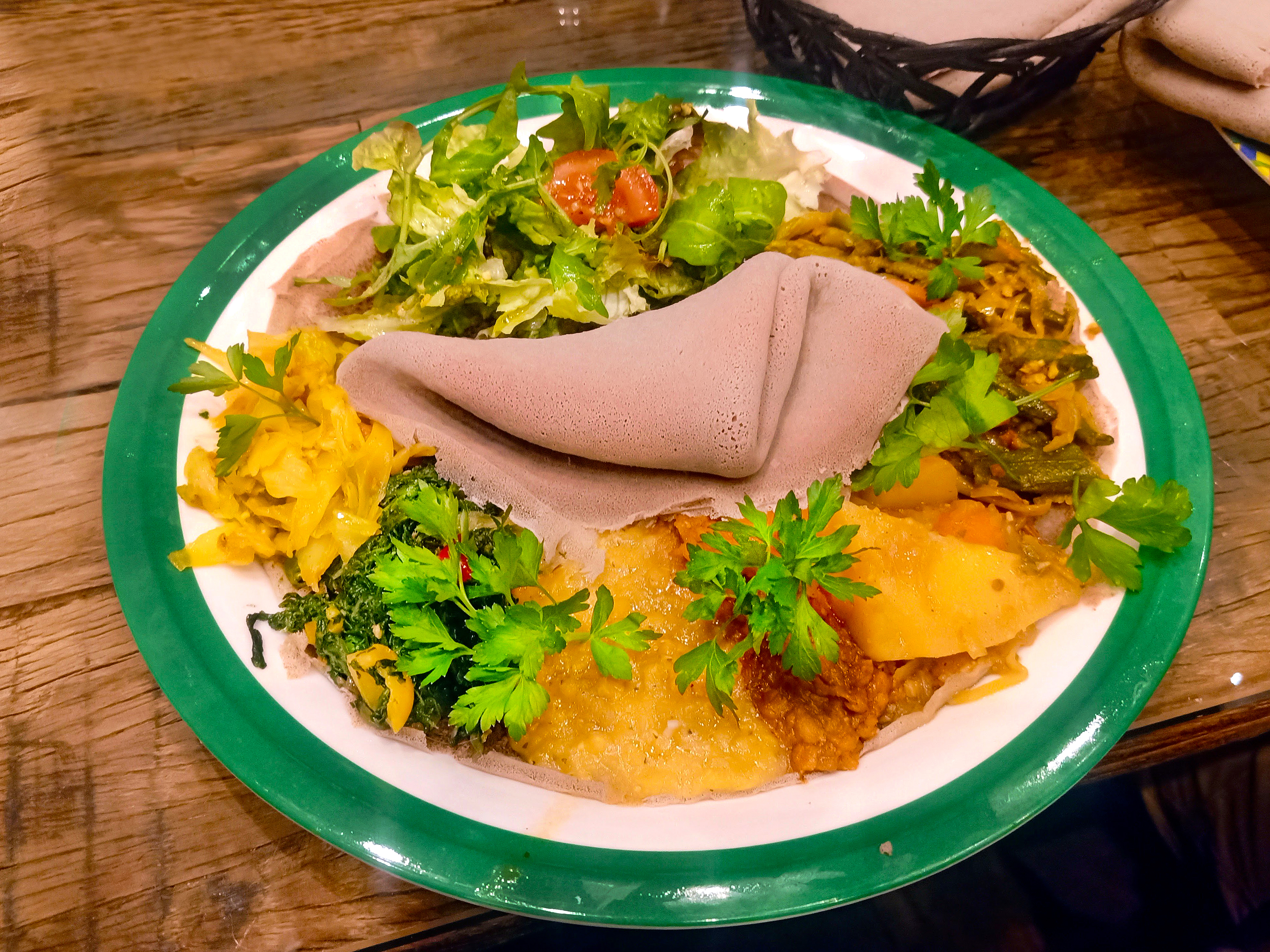
Ethiopian vegetarian food plate of ʾätkəlt bäyaynätu with Injera bread in Paris

=== Wat ===
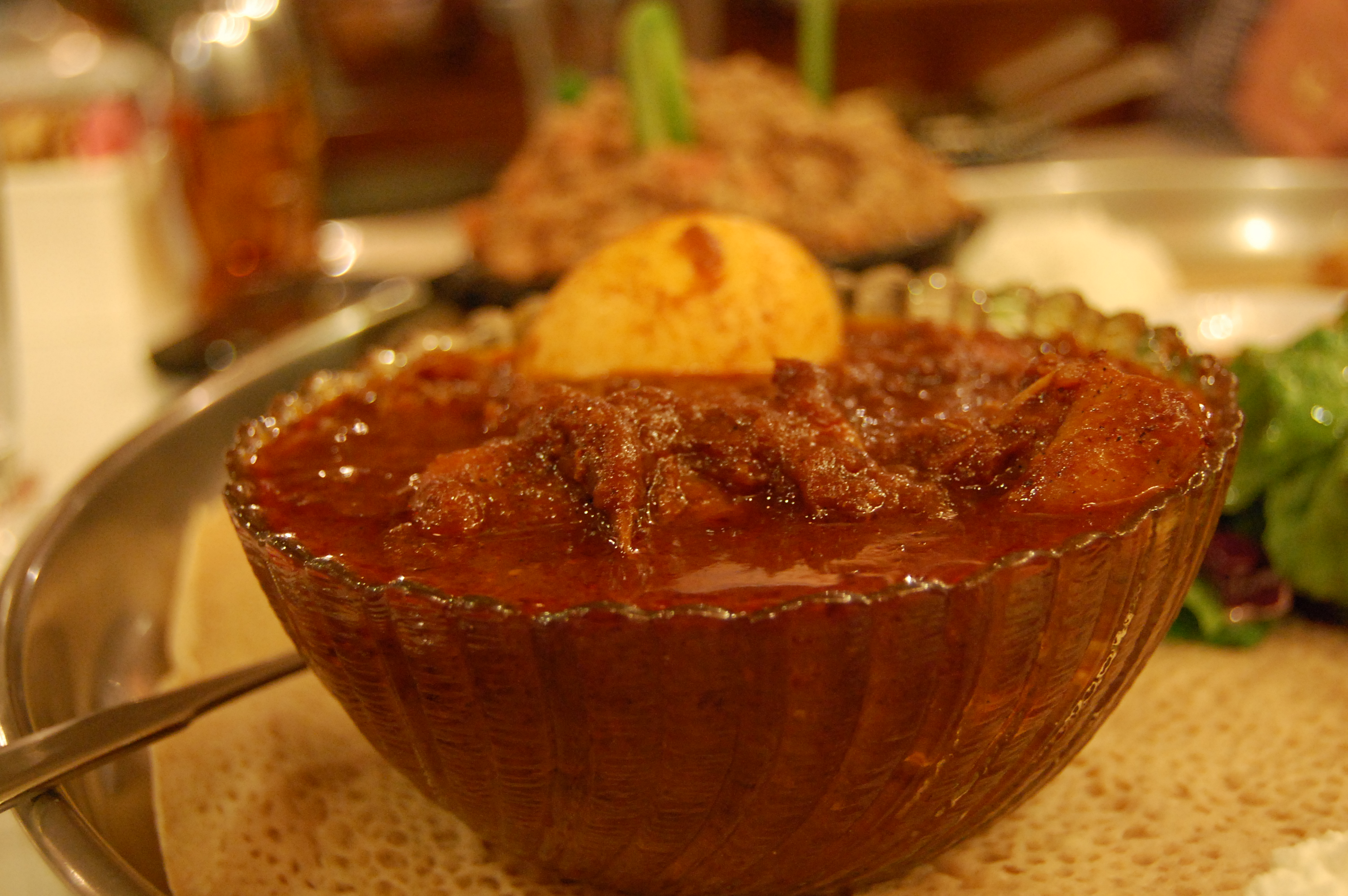
Doro wat, consisting of stewed chicken and boiled eggs, is one of the most popular dishes for breaking religious fasts in Ethiopia.

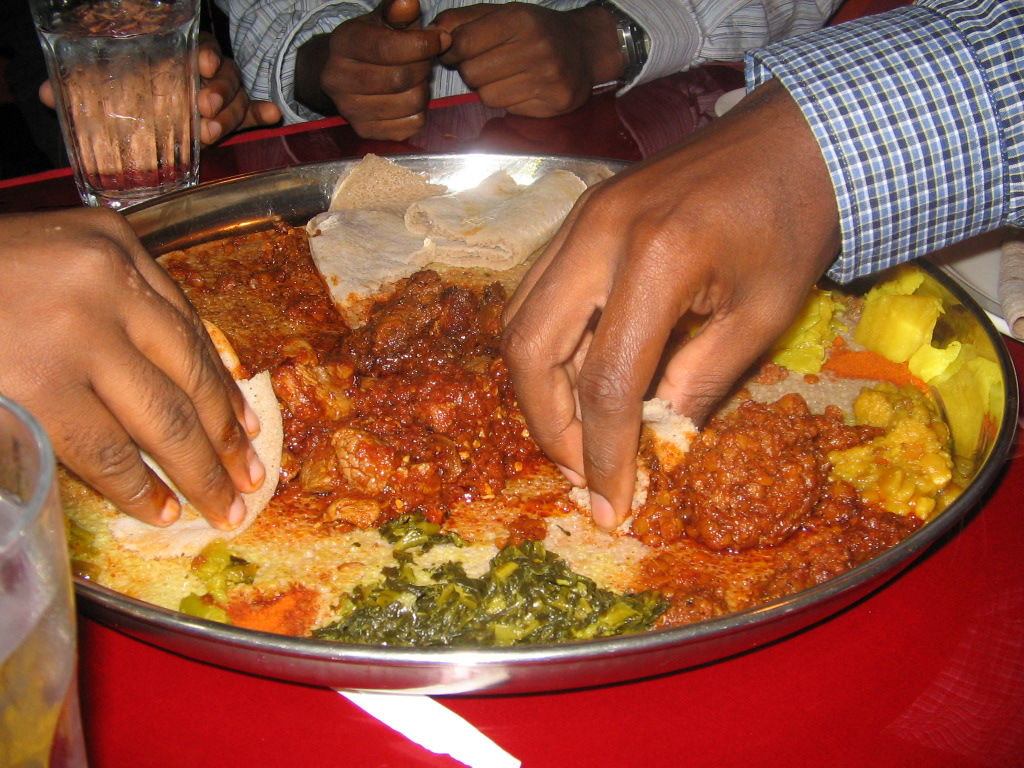
A typical serving of wat

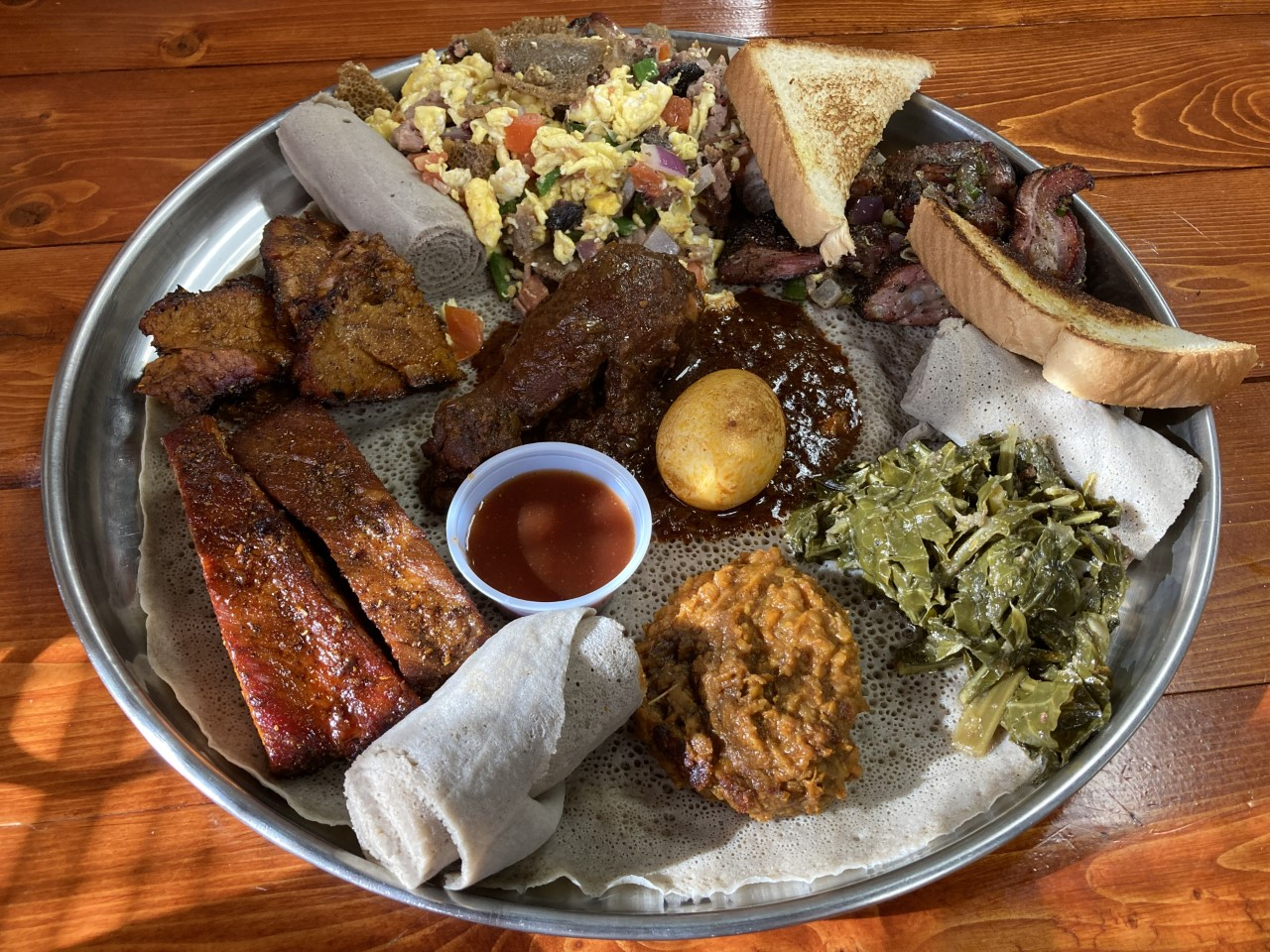
Ethiopian food merged with American barbeque influence

Wat begins with a large amount of chopped red onion, which is simmered or sauteed in a pot. Once the onions have softened, niter kebbeh (or, in the case of vegan dishes, vegetable oil) is added. Following this, berbere is added to make a spicy keiy wat or keyyih tsebhi. Turmeric is used instead of berbere for a milder alicha wat or both spices are omitted when making vegetable stews, such as atkilt wat. Meat such as beef (ሥጋ, səga), chicken (ዶሮ, doro or derho), fish (ዓሣ, asa), goat or lamb (በግ, beg or beggi) is also added. Legumes such as split peas (ክክ, kək or kikki) and lentils (ምስር, məsər or birsin); or vegetables such as potatoes (ድንች, Dənəch), carrots and chard (ቆስጣ) are also used instead in vegan dishes.

Each variation is named by appending the main ingredient to the type of wat (e.g. kek alicha wat). However, the word keiy is usually not necessary, as the spicy variety is assumed when it is omitted (e.g. doro wat). The term atkilt wat which simply means 'vegetable' is sometimes used to refer to all vegetable dishes, but a more specific name can also be used (as in dinich'na caroht wat, which translates to "potatoes and carrots stew"; but the word atkilt is usually omitted when using the more specific term).

=== Tibs ===
Meat along with vegetables are sautéed to make tibs (Ge'ez: ጥብስ, romanized: ṭïbs), also spelled tebs, t'ibs, tibbs, etc. Tibs is served in a variety of manners, and can range from hot to mild or contain little to no vegetables. There are many variations of the delicacy, depending on type, size or shape of the cuts of meat used. Beef, mutton, and goat are the most common meats used in the preparation of tibs.

The mid-18th-century European visitor to Ethiopia Remedius Prutky describes tibs as a portion of grilled meat served "to pay a particular compliment or show especial respect to someone." It may still be seen this way; today the dish is prepared to commemorate special events and holidays.

=== Kinche (qinch'e) ===
Kinche (qinch’e), a porridge, is a very common and cheap Ethiopian breakfast or supper. It is made from cracked wheat, Ethiopian oats, barley or a mixture of those. It can be boiled in either milk or water with a little salt. The flavor of kinche comes from the nit'ir qibe, which is a spiced butter. Once cooked, kinche is combined in the pan with clarified spiced butter, oil, and fried onions, though it is also eaten plain without any additional seasonings.

=== Salads ===
Azifa is an Ethiopian lentil salad made with mustard seed, jalapeños, and onions, and it is a dish often served cold. Buticha is an Ethiopian chickpea salad which is often served cold, and is sometimes compared to hummus. Timatim (tomato) salad is also common.

== Ethnic dishes ==
=== Amhara dishes ===
The Amharas' cuisine features a wide variety of dishes and beverages, often centered around injera, a sourdough flatbread made from teff flour. The cuisine is known for its use of spices, rich stews, and traditional cooking methods.

==== Dishes ====
- Injera – a sourdough flatbread made from teff flour, serving as the base for most meals and used to scoop stews and dishes.
- Doro wot – a spicy chicken stew with boiled eggs, flavored with berbere spice mix and niter kibbeh (spiced clarified butter).
- Tibs – sautéed meat (beef or lamb) cooked with onions, tomatoes, and spices, often served sizzling hot.
- Siga wot – a rich and spicy beef stew made with berbere and slow-cooked until tender.
- Anebabero – layered thick injera soaked in a butter and spiced berbere mixture.
- Fir-fir – shredded injera or bread mixed with spicy stew or wot, often served as a hearty breakfast.
- Asa goulash – a fish stew cooked with onions, tomatoes, and berbere, often served with injera or bread.

==== Snacks ====
- Dabo (traditional bread varieties include ambasha, difo dabo, and hibist)
  - Ambasha dabo – a celebration bread that is slightly sweet, with decorative marks made on the dough before baking.
  - Difo dabo – baked bread wrapped in false banana leaves for a unique flavor.
- Dabo kolo – crunchy, fried or baked dough snacks seasoned with a hint of spice, popular as a light snack.
- Kolo – roasted barley or wheat mixed with peanuts, eaten as a portable snack.

==== Beverages ====
- Tella – traditional Tigray beer brewed with barley, hops, and gesho leaves, often consumed during celebrations.
- Tej – sweet Amhara honey wine, served at special occasions and known for its distinct flavor.
- Birz – A non-alcoholic honey beverage, lightly fermented and considered refreshing.

=== Oromo dishes ===
The Oromos' cuisine consists of various vegetable or meat side dishes and entrées. As part of a long-established custom, practice, or belief, people do not eat pork in Oromia.

- Anchotte – a common dish in the western part of Oromia
- Baduu – liquid remaining after milk has been curdled and strained (cheese)
- Chororsaa – a common dish in the western part of Oromia
- Chukkoo – also known as micira; a sweet flavor of whole grain, seasoned with butter and spices
- Dadhii – a drink made from honey
- Dokkee – a common dish throughout Oromia state
- Farsho – beer-like beverage, made from barley
- Maarqaa – porridge-like substance made from wheat, milk, chili and spices
- Itto – comprises all sorts of vegetables (tomato, potato, ginger, garlic), meat (lamb)
- Chechebsaa – shredded biddena stir-fried with chili powder and cheese
- Qince – similar to marqaa but made from shredded grains as opposed to flour
- Qoocco – also known as kocho, it is not the Gurage type of kocho but a different kind; a common dish in the western part of Oromia
- Qorso (akayi) – snack made by roasting barley seeds
- Ukkaamssa (affaanyii) – stewed ground beef with spices, minced onion, garlic, green chili pepper, and clarified butter.

=== Gurage dishes ===
==== Kitfo ====
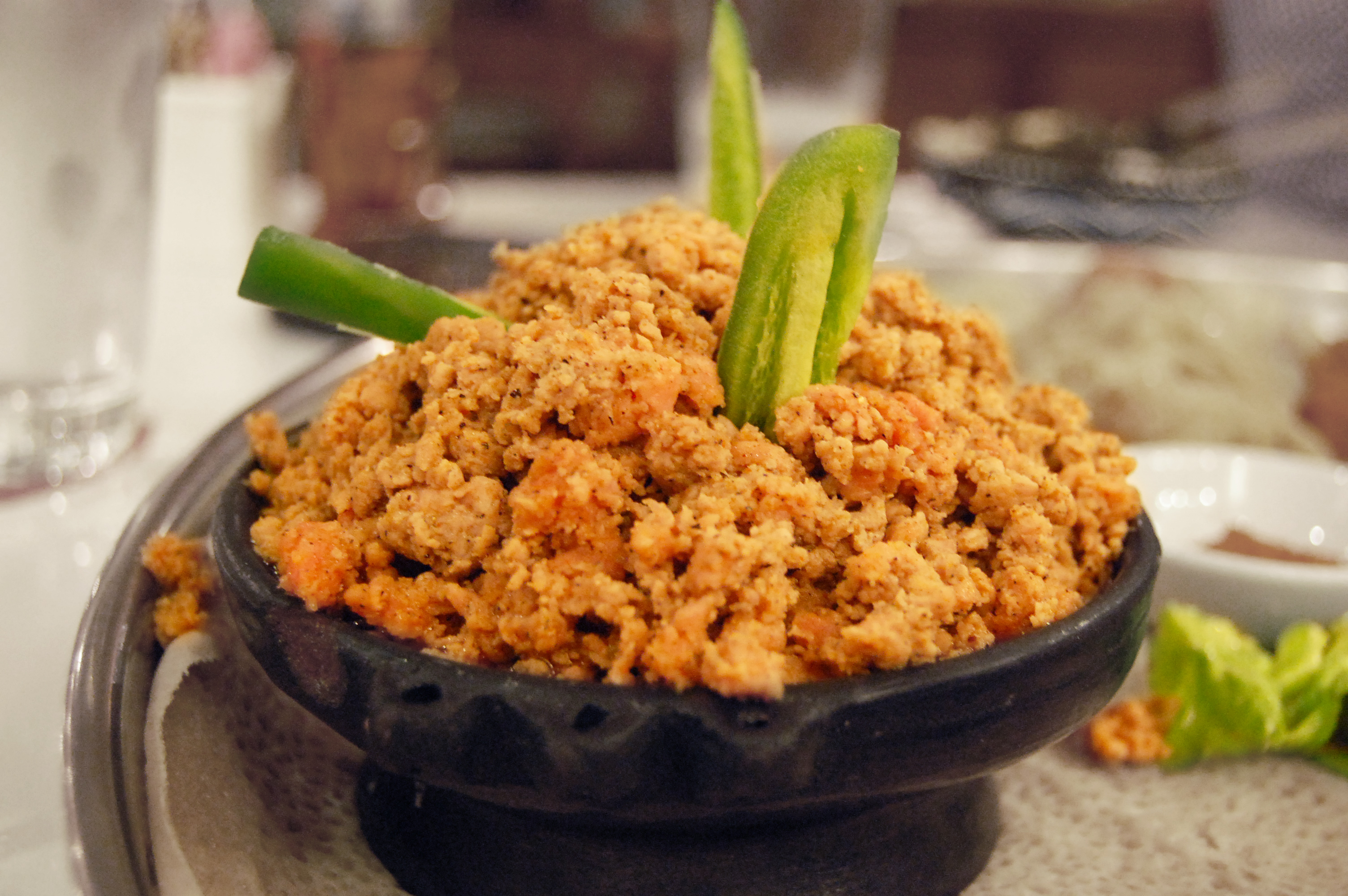
Kitfo served rare

Another distinctively Ethiopian dish is kitfo (frequently spelled ketfo). It consists of raw (or rare) beef mince marinated in mitmita (Ge'ez: ሚጥሚጣ mīṭmīṭā a very spicy chili powder similar to berbere) and niter kibbeh. Gored gored is very similar to kitfo, but uses cubed rather than ground beef.

==== Ayibe ====
Ayibe (or ayeb) is a local cheese made from the curds of buttermilk that is mild and crumbly, close in texture to crumbled feta. Although not quite pressed, the whey has been drained and squeezed out. It is often served as a side dish to soften the effect of very spicy food. It has little to no distinct taste of its own. However, when served separately, ayibe is often mixed with a variety of mild or hot spices typical of Gurage cuisine.

==== Gomen kitfo ====
Gomen kitfo is another typical Gurage dish. Collard greens (ጎመን gōmen) are boiled, dried and then finely chopped and served with butter, chili and spices. It is a dish specially prepared for the occasion of Meskel, a holiday marking the discovery of the True Cross. It is served along with ayibe or sometimes even kitfo in this tradition called dengesa.

=== Sidama dishes ===
==== Wassa ====
The enset plant (called wesse in the Sidamo language) is central to Sidama cuisine and after grinding and fermenting the root to produce wassa, it is used in the preparation of several foods.

==== Borasaame ====
Borasaame is a cooked mixture of wassa and butter sometimes eaten with Ethiopian mustard greens and/or beans. It is traditionally eaten by hand using a false banana leaf and is served in a 'shafeta, a vase-like ceramic vessel. A common variant of borasaame uses maize flour instead of wassa and is called badela borasaame. Borasaame is typically paired with a seasoned yogurt drink called wätät. Both are common foods for funerals and the celebration of Fichee Chambalaalla, the Sidama new year.

==== Amulcho ====
Amulcho is an enset flatbread used similarly to injera to eat wats made from beef, mushrooms, beans, gomen, or pumpkin.

==== Gomen ba siga ====
Gomen ba siga (ጎመን በስጋ, Amharic: "cabbage with meat") is a stewed mixture of beef and Ethiopian mustard served under a layer of amulcho bread.

==== Maize ====
A commonly grown crop in Sidama, maize (badela in Sidaamu; also known as "corn" in North America) is often eaten as a snack with coffee. It can be ground into flour to make bread, roasted on the cob, or the kernels can be picked off to make bokolo, which is served either boiled or roasted.

Tigrigna dishes

==== Dishes ====
- Injera – a sourdough flatbread made from teff flour, serving as the base for most meals and used to scoop stews and dishes.
- Doro wot – a spicy chicken stew with boiled eggs, flavored with berbere spice mix and niter kibbeh (spiced clarified butter).
- Tibs – sautéed meat (beef or lamb) cooked with onions, tomatoes, and spices, often served sizzling hot.
- Siga wot – a rich and spicy beef stew made with berbere and slow-cooked until tender.
- Anebabero – layered thick injera soaked in a butter and spiced berbere mixture.
- Fir-fir – shredded injera or bread mixed with spicy stew or wot, often served as a hearty breakfast.
- Asa goulash – a fish stew cooked with onions, tomatoes, and berbere, often served with injera or bread.

==== Snacks ====
- Dabo (traditional bread varieties include ambasha, difo dabo, and hibist)
  - Ambasha dabo – a celebration bread that is slightly sweet, with decorative marks made on the dough before baking.
  - Difo dabo – baked bread wrapped in false banana leaves for a unique flavor.
- Dabo kolo – crunchy, fried or baked dough snacks seasoned with a hint of spice, popular as a light snack.
- Kolo – roasted barley or wheat mixed with peanuts, eaten as a portable snack.

==== Beverages ====
- Tella – traditional Tigray beer brewed with barley, hops, and gesho leaves, often consumed during celebrations.
- Tej – sweet Amhara honey wine, served at special occasions and known for its distinct flavor.
- Birz – A non-alcoholic honey beverage, lightly fermented and considered refreshing.

== Breakfast ==
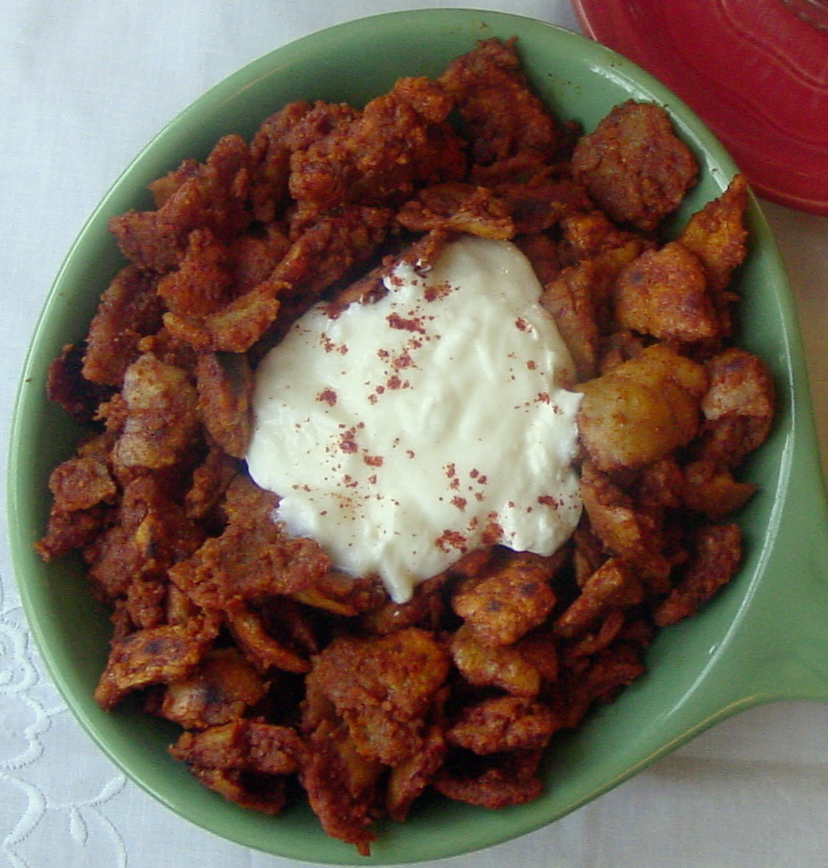
Fit-fit, or chechebsa, made with kitcha (unleavened bread), niter kibbeh (seasoned clarified butter) and berbere (spice), is a typical breakfast food.

Fit-fit or fir-fir is a common breakfast dish. It is made from shredded injera or kitcha stir-fried with spices or wat. Another popular breakfast food is fatira, a large fried pancake made with flour, often with a layer of egg, eaten with honey.

Chechebsa (or kita firfir) resembles a pancake covered with berbere and niter kibbeh, or other spices, and may be eaten with a spoon. Genfo is a kind of porridge, which is another common breakfast dish. It is usually served in a large bowl with a dug-out made in the middle of the genfo and filled with spiced niter kibbeh.

A variation of ful, a fava bean stew with condiments, served with baked rolls instead of injera, is also common for breakfast.

== Snacks ==
Typical Ethiopian snacks are dabo kolo (small pieces of baked bread that are similar to pretzels), or kolo (roasted barley sometimes mixed with other local grains). Kolo made from roasted and spiced barley, safflower kernels, chickpeas and/or peanuts are often sold by kiosks and street vendors, wrapped in a paper cone. Halewa is made with peanuts. Snacking on popcorn and traditional lentil samosas is also common.

== Beverages ==
=== Alcoholic beverages ===
Alcoholic beverages prepared in Ethiopia include tella, tej, and areki. Tella is a home-brewed beer prepared with barley and gesho (Rhamnus prinoides). It is served in tella bet ("tella houses") which specialize in serving only tella. Tella is the most common beverage made and served in households during holidays. In Oromiffaa, the drink is called farso and in Tigrinya siwa.

Tej is a potent honey wine, prepared with gesho and honey. It is similar to mead, and is frequently served in bars, particularly in a tej bet or "tej house". It has a sweet taste and the alcoholic content is relatively higher than tella. This drink can be stored for a long time; the longer it is stored, the higher the alcohol content, and the stronger the taste.

Areki, also known as katikala, is probably the strongest alcoholic drink of Ethiopia. It is a home distilled spirit that is often filtered through charcoal to remove off tastes or flavored by smoking or infusion with garlic.

Wine is also consumed, and several beers are made locally.

=== Non-alcoholic beverages ===
Non-alcoholic drinks including Kenetto and Borde. Kenetto, also known as keribo, is mostly used as substitute for tella for those who do not drink alcohol. Borde is a cereal-based traditional fermented beverage famous in southern Ethiopia. Drinks common elsewhere such as sodas are also consumed.

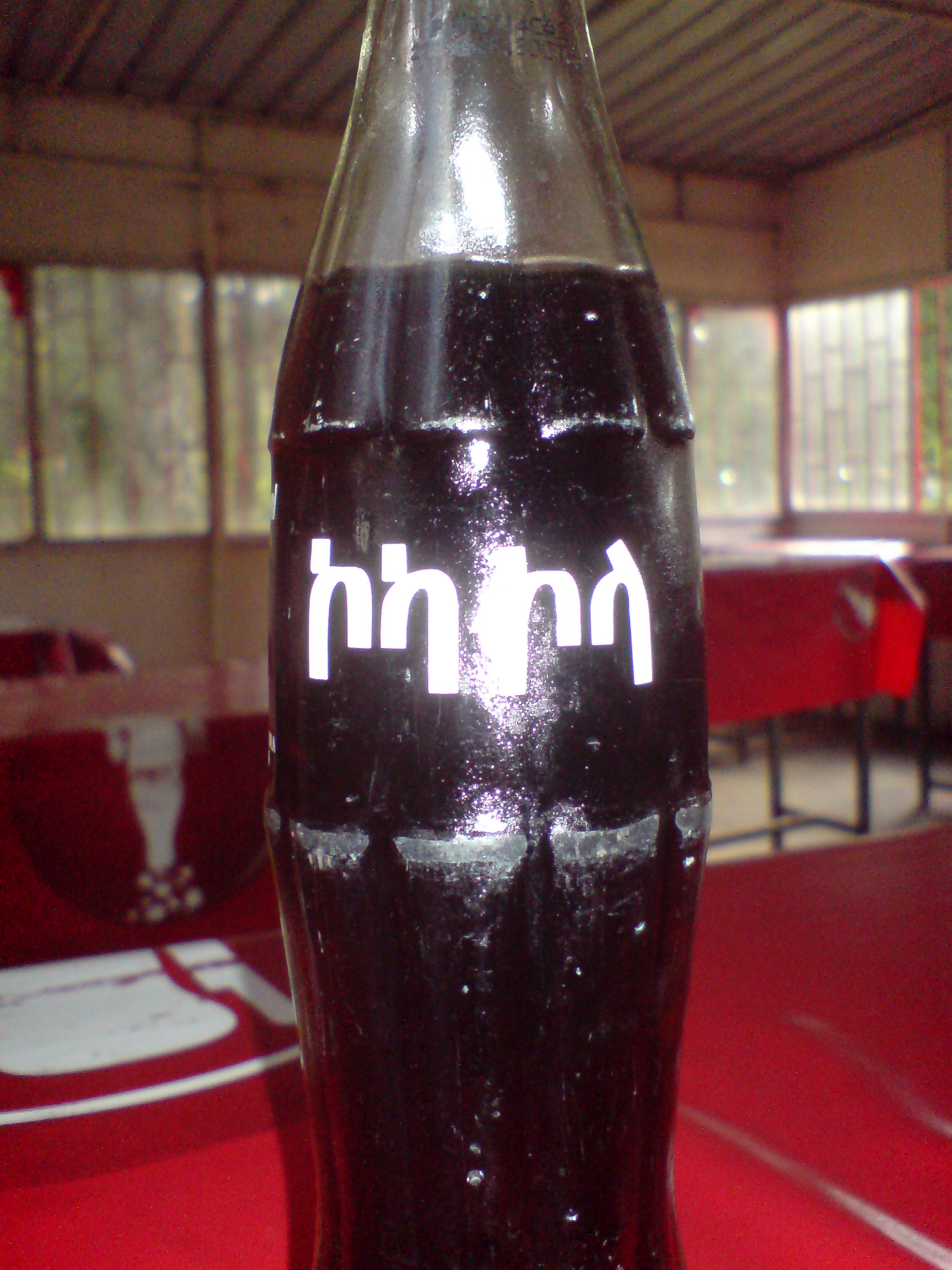
A Coca-Cola bottle in Ethiopia, with the logo in the Ethiopic script

Ambo Mineral Water or Ambo wuha is a bottled carbonated mineral water, sourced from the springs in Ambo Senkele near the town of Ambo.

=== Non-alcoholic brews (hot drinks) ===
==== Atmet ====
Atmet is a barley- and oat-flour based drink that is cooked with water, sugar and kibe (Ethiopian clarified butter) until the ingredients have become slightly thicker than eggnog. Though this drink is often given to women who are nursing, it is generally regarded as a comfort drink due to its sweetness and smooth texture.

==== Coffee ====
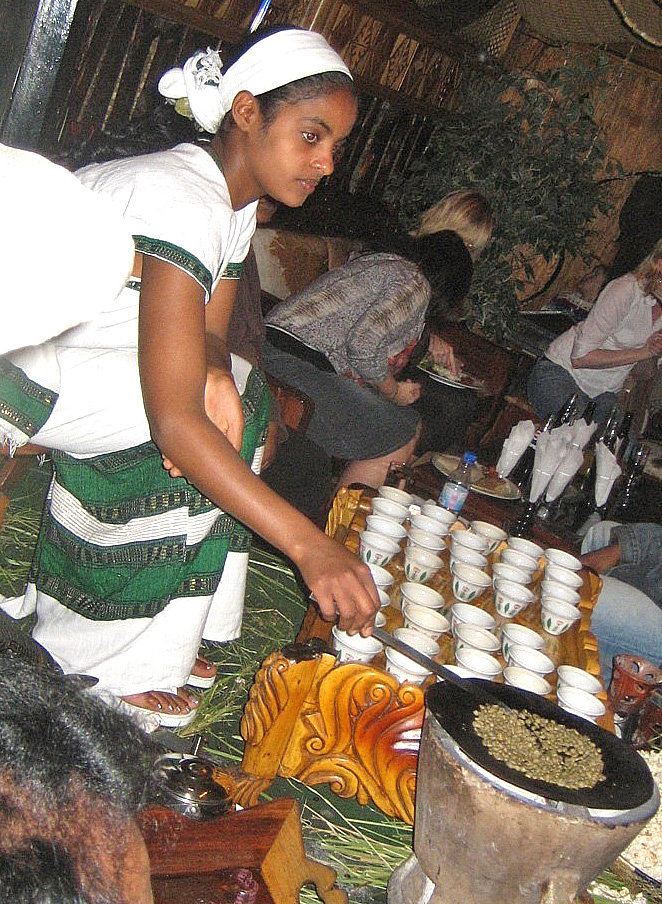
An Ethiopian woman roasting coffee at a traditional coffee ceremony

According to some sources, coffee-drinking (buna) likely originated in Ethiopia. A key national beverage, it is an important part of local commerce.

The coffee ceremony is the traditional serving of coffee, usually after a big meal. It often involves the use of a jebena (ጀበና), a clay coffee pot in which the coffee is boiled. The preparer roasts the coffee beans in front of guests, then walks around wafting the smoke throughout the room so participants may sample the scent of coffee. Then the preparer grinds the coffee beans in a traditional tool called a mokecha. The coffee is put into the jebena, boiled with water, and then served in small cups called si'ni. Coffee is usually served with sugar, but is also served with salt in many parts of Ethiopia. In some parts of the country, niter kibbeh is added instead of sugar or salt.

Snacks, such as popcorn or toasted barley (or kolo), are often served with the coffee. In most homes, a dedicated coffee area is surrounded by fresh grass, with special furniture for the coffee maker. A complete ceremony has three rounds of coffee (abol, tona and bereka) and is accompanied by the burning of frankincense.

==== Tea (shai) ====
Tea will most likely be served if coffee is declined. Tea is grown in Ethiopia at Gumaro and Wushwush.

==== Boiled coffee leaves ====
Across southern Ethiopia, many groups drink boiled coffee leaves, called kuti among the Harari in the east and kaari among the Majang in the west. This is often made with widely varying seasonings and spices, such as sugar, salt, rue, hot peppers, ginger. The Ethiopian Food Safety Authority has registered the safety of coffee leaf infusions with the European Union.

== See also ==
- List of African cuisines
- Ethiopian Jewish cuisine
- Eritrean cuisine
