= Buhe =

Ethiopian and Eritrean Orthodox Tewahedo Church feast day, observed on 19 August

Buhe ቡሄ
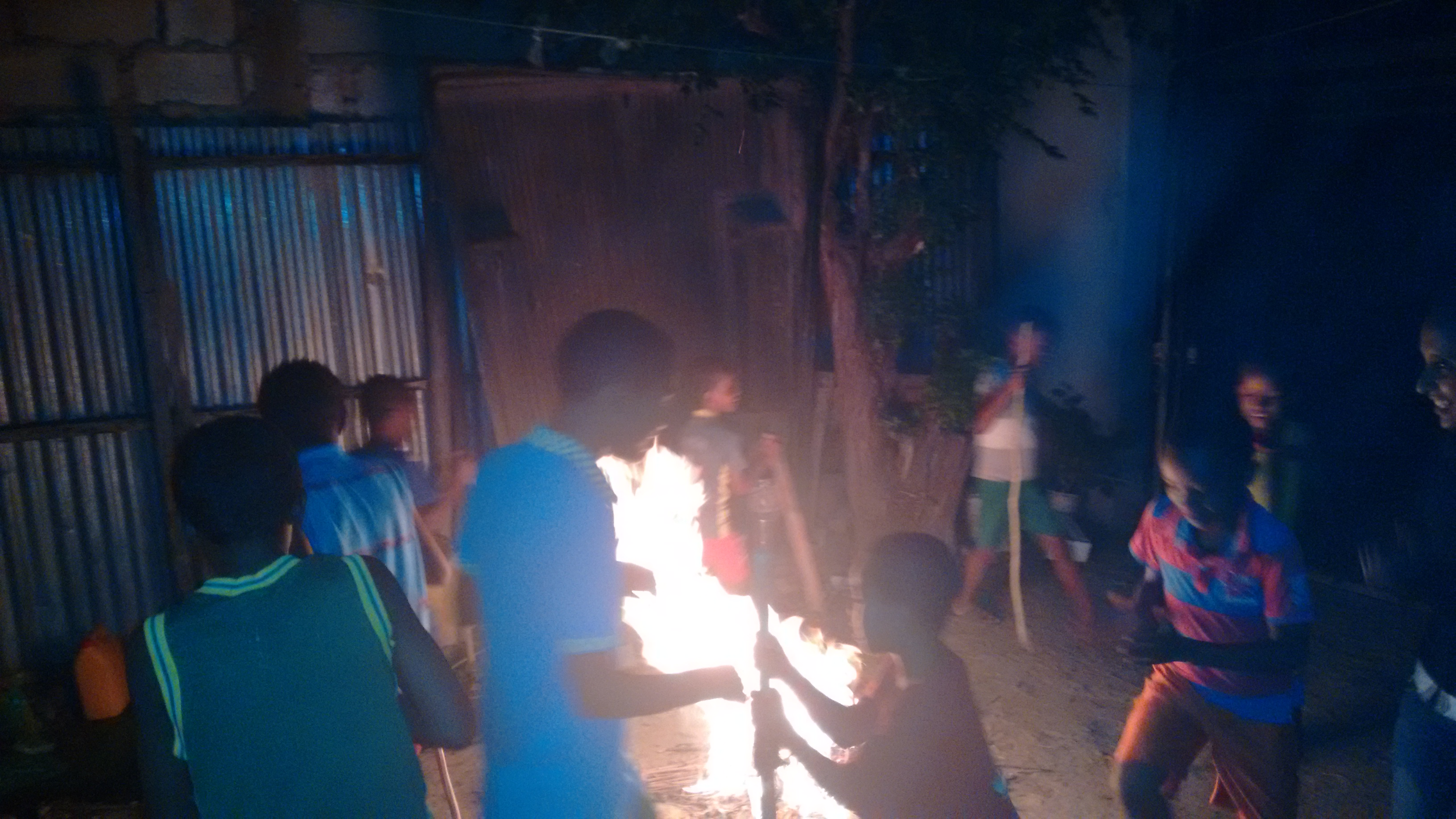
- People from home gathering into torch and sing "Hoya Hoye" in 2016
- Observed by: Ethiopian Orthodox Church; Eritrean Orthodox Church
- Significance: Transfiguration of Jesus on Mount Tabor
- Celebrations: People in neighborhood gather and circumambulate chibo while singing "Hoya Hoye"; Group of children sing outside people's home with exchange of mulmul bread
- Date: 19 August
- Next time: 19 August 2026
- Frequency: Annual

Buhe (Ge'ez: ቡሄ Buhē) is a feast day observed by the Ethiopian Orthodox Tewahedo Church and Eritrean Orthodox Tewahedo Church on 19 August (13 Nahase in the Ethiopian calendar). On this date, the Ethiopian Orthodox Church celebrates the Transfiguration of Jesus on Mount Tabor (Debre Tabor Ge'ez: ደብረ ታቦር).

== Observance ==
Buhe is celebrated by the Ethiopian and Eritrean Orthodox Tewahedo Churches on 19 August (13 Nehase in Ethiopian calendar) in commemoration of the Transfiguration of Jesus on Mount Tabor (Debre Tabor in Ge'ez). Buhe is one of the old-age religious and cultural festivals.

Observations include people of the neighborhood tie a bundle of sticks together to make a chibo, and set it on fire while singing songs. The main song is called "Hoya Hoye" with one singer singing while the others follow in a rhythmic way. It involves young boys singing songs of praise outside of people's homes, in exchange for fresh bread called mulmul. The boys then bless the family of the home for the following year.
