= Chibo =

Torch used in Ethiopian Orthodox Tewahedo Church ceremonies

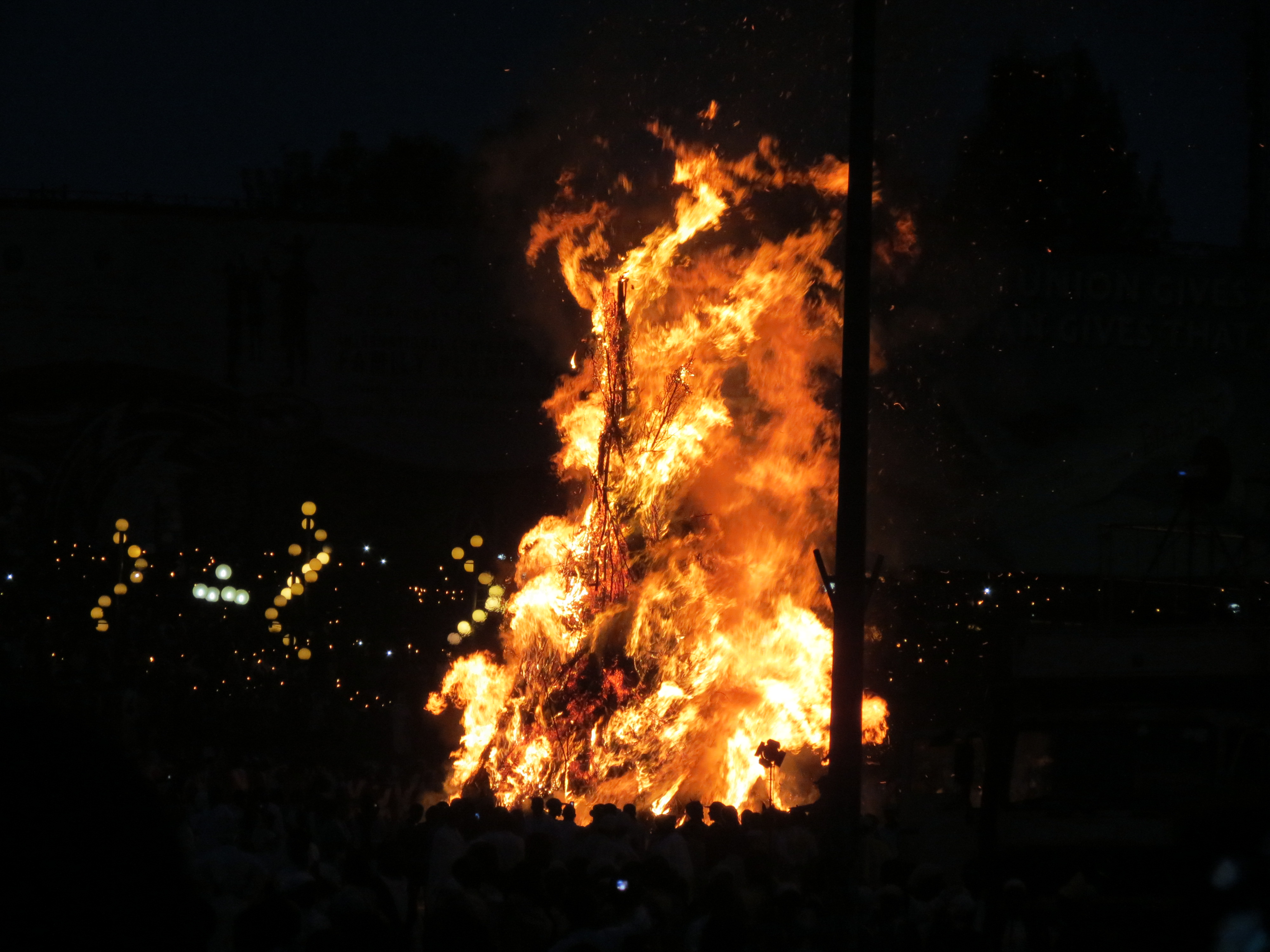
Chibo engulfed in flame during Demera (Meskel's eve) celebration, 2013

A chibo (or chebo) is a torch used in the Ethiopian Orthodox ceremonies of Buhe, Meskel, and Enkutatash (the Ethiopian New Year). Chibo is Amharic for "bundle of sticks tied together." Chibo represents the following period of sunny days, from the previous seasons of rain and clouds.
