= Kitfo =

Ethiopian raw beef dish

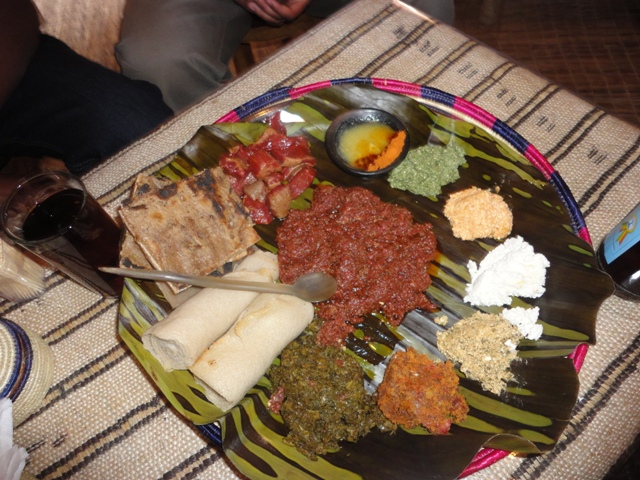
Platter with kitfo

Kitfo (Amharic: ክትፎ, IPA: [kɨtfo]) is an Ethiopian traditional dish that originated among the Gurage people. It consists of minced raw beef, marinated in mitmita (a chili-based spice powder) and niter kibbeh (a clarified butter infused with herbs and spices). The word comes from the Ethio-Semitic triconsonantal root k-t-f, meaning "to chop finely; mince".

Kitfo cooked lightly rare is known as kitfo leb leb. Kitfo is often served alongside — or sometimes mixed with — a mild cheese called ayibe or cooked greens known as gomen. In many parts of Ethiopia, kitfo is served with injera, a spongy, absorbent sourdough crêpe-like flatbread made from fermented teff flour; traditional Gurage cuisine replaces this with kocho, a thick flatbread made of the ensete plant. An ensete leaf may be also used as a garnish.

Though not considered a delicacy, kitfo is generally held in high regard. It is served on special occasions such as holidays like Meskel on 27 September, the feast celebrating the Finding of the True Cross.

== See also ==
- Gored gored
- Steak tartare
- Kibbeh nayyeh
- Cig kofte
- List of African dishes
- List of Ethiopian dishes and foods
