= Kocho (food) =

Bread-like fermented food in Ethiopia

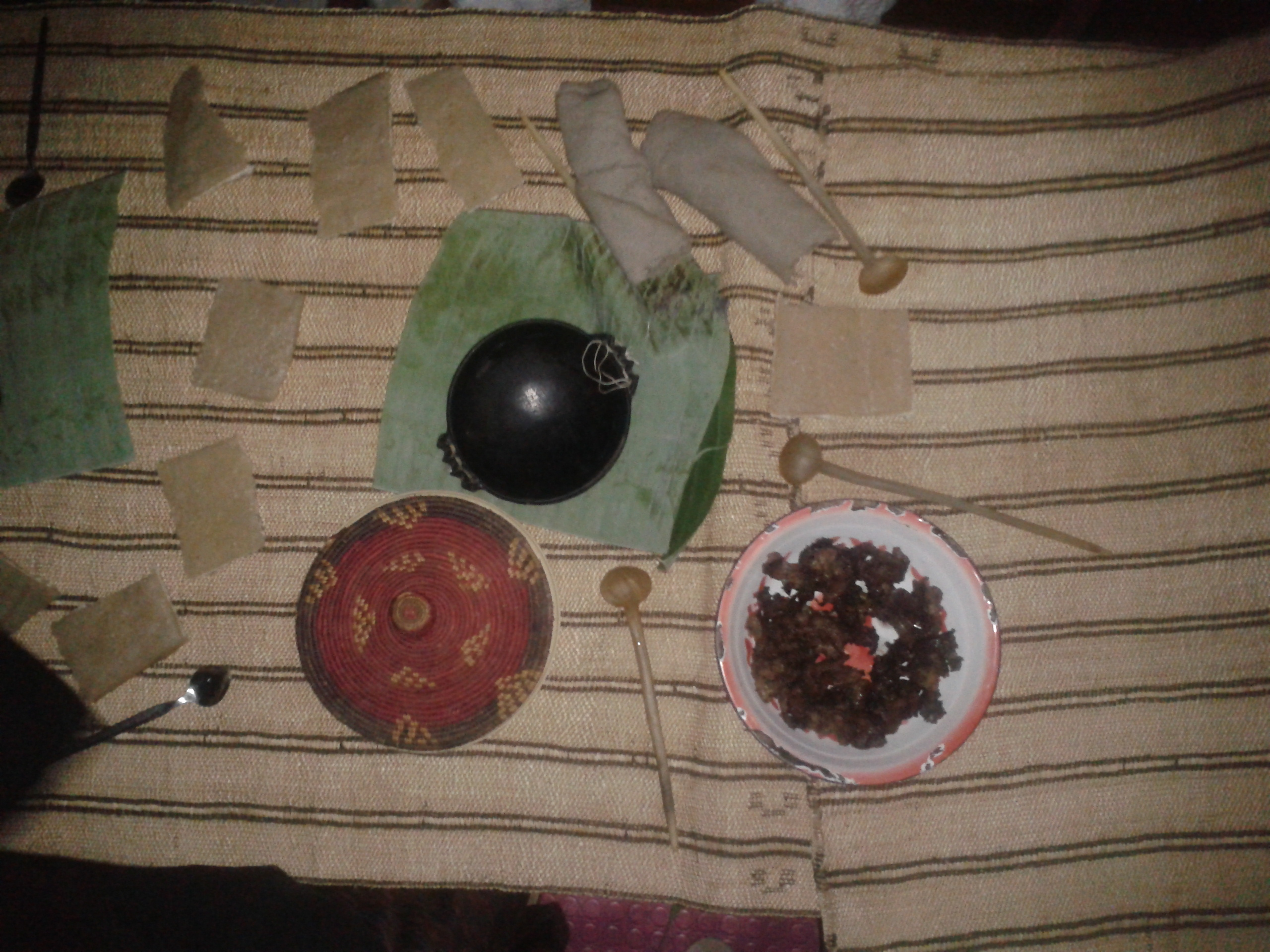
Kocho

Kocho (Ge'ez: ቆጮ, ḳōč̣ō) is a bread-like fermented food made from chopped and grated ensete pulp. The pseudo-stem of the ensete plant contains a pith that is collected, pulped, and mixed with yeast before being fermented for three months to two years. It is used as a staple in Ethiopian cuisine in place of or alongside injera. In 1975 more than one-sixth of Ethiopians depended completely or partially on kocho for a substantial part of their food. It is eaten with foods such as kitfo, gomen (cooked greens), and ayibe (cheese). The stem is pounded to extract the pulp, which is then fermented for several weeks before being cooked. Kocho is often served with stews and is a staple food in some parts of Ethiopia. It has a sour taste and a dense, dough-like texture. It is made from the scraped leaf sheath fibre and pulverised corm of the enset plant. Kocho can be stored underground from three months to twelve months, making it a ready source of nutrition during periods of food scarcity. Kocho is typically used as a utensil to scoop up other foods.
