= Himbasha =

Bread native to Ethiopia and Eritrea

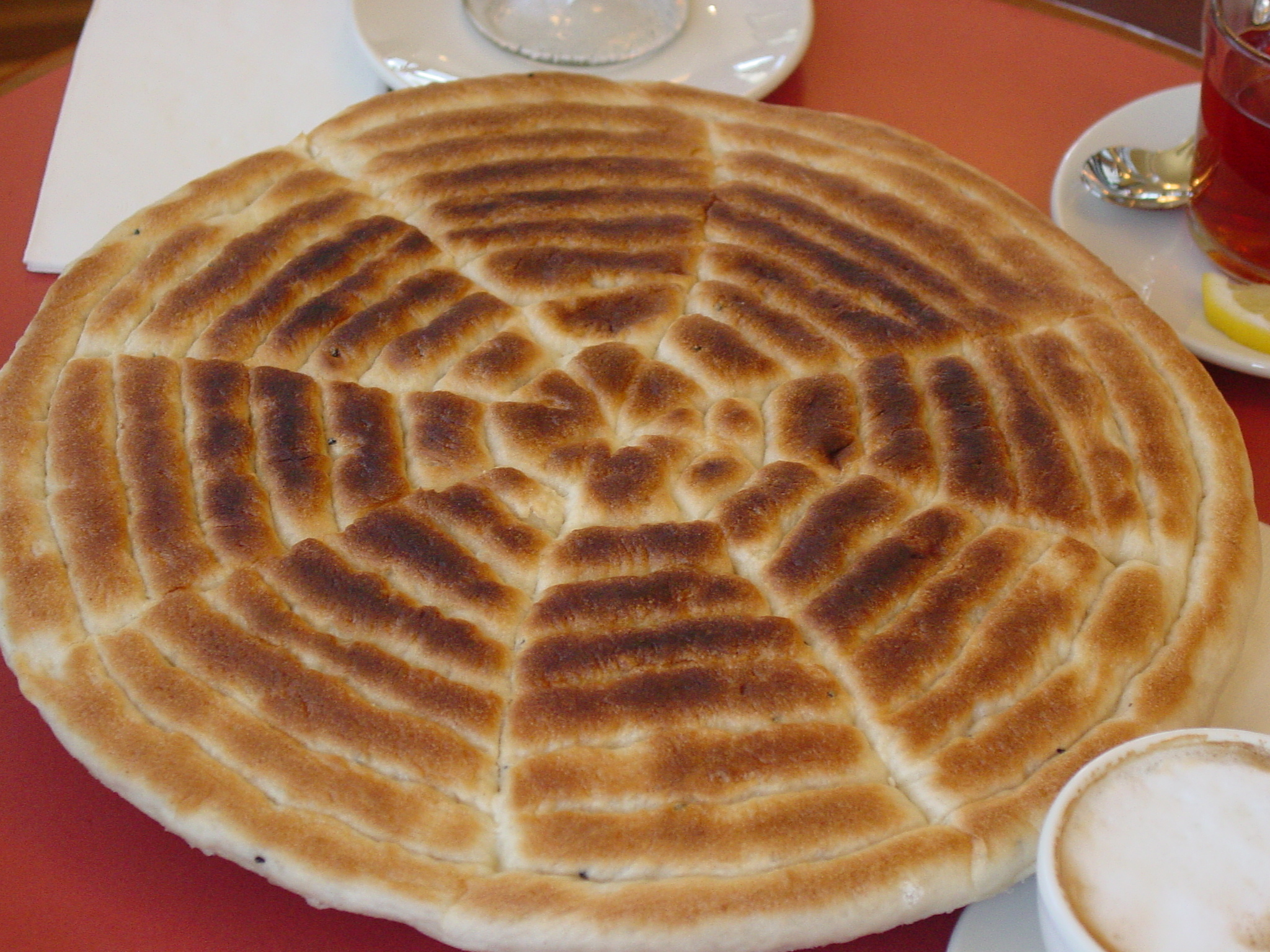
- Type: Sweet bread
- Place of origin: Eritrea, Ethiopia
- Region or state: Eritrean Highlands, Amhara, Tigray
- Main ingredients: Cardamom seeds, candied ginger, raisins

Himbasha (Tigrinya: ሕምባሻ) or Ambasha (Amharic: አምባሻ), is an Ethiopian and Eritrean celebration bread that is slightly sweet. It became popular in Eritrean cuisine, often served at special occasions. It is prepared in a number of varieties depending on region and nationality with the main two being the quintessential Ethiopian variant, and the more distinctive Eritrean flavoring with raisins.

The dough is given a decorative touch before baking. The design varies in detail, but in general, is given the shape of a wheel with indentations to create several spokes (see picture).

Common additions to the recipe include candied orange, ginger, or ground cardamom seeds, although plain varieties are not unheard of.

== See also ==
- Ethiopian cuisine
- List of African dishes
