= Coffee ceremony of Ethiopia and Eritrea =

Coffee culture of Ethiopia and Eritrea

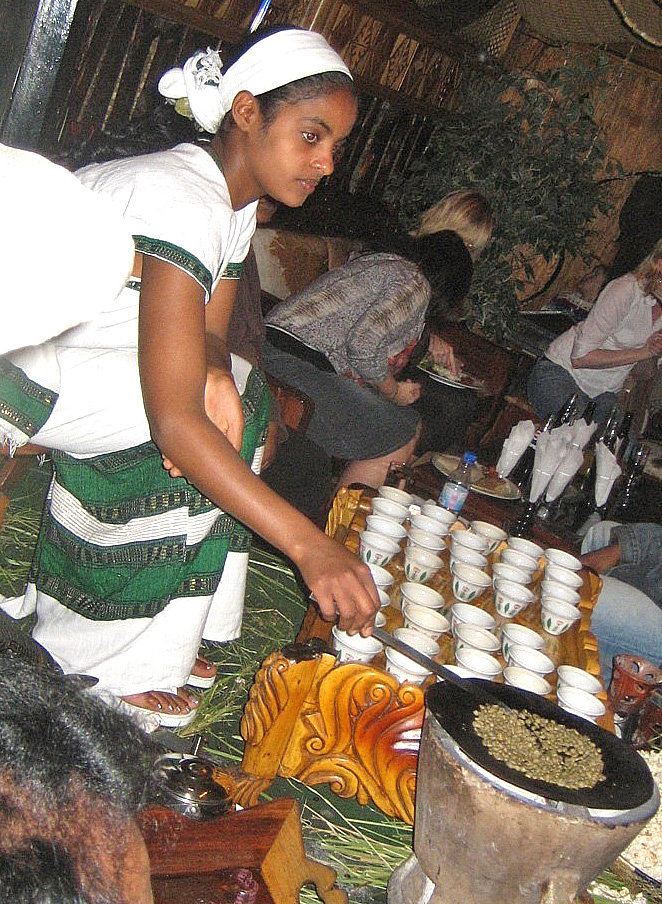
An Ethiopian woman roasting coffee at a traditional ceremony.

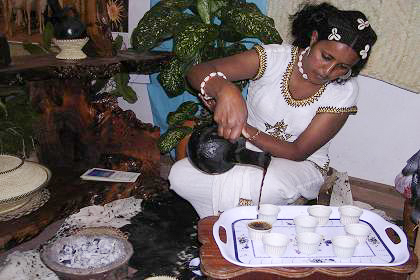
An Eritrean woman pouring traditionally brewed coffee into finjal from a jebena.

The Ethiopian coffee ceremony is a coffee culture practiced in Ethiopia and Eritrea. There is a routine of serving coffee daily, mainly for the purpose of getting together with relatives, neighbors, or other visitors. If coffee is politely declined, then tea will most likely be served.

Loose grass is spread on the floor where the coffee ceremony is held, often decorated with small yellow flowers. Composite flowers are sometimes used, especially around the celebration of Meskel (an Orthodox holiday celebrated by Ethiopians and Eritreans).

== Brewing ==
The ceremony is typically performed by the woman of the household and is considered an honor. The coffee is brewed by first roasting the green coffee beans over an open flame in a pan. This is followed by the grinding of the beans using a mukecha, a traditional wooden mortar and pestle. The finely ground beans are then brewed in a jebena – a traditional clay pot, which contains boiling water and will be left on an open flame for a couple of minutes before adding the coffee. The aroma of the roasting beans plays a role in the ceremony, as it is often shared with guests as a gesture of hospitality. After grinding, the coffee is put through a sieve several times. The boiling pot (jebena) is usually made of pottery and has a spherical base, a neck and pouring spout, and a handle where the neck connects with the base. The jebena also has a straw lid.

== Serving ==
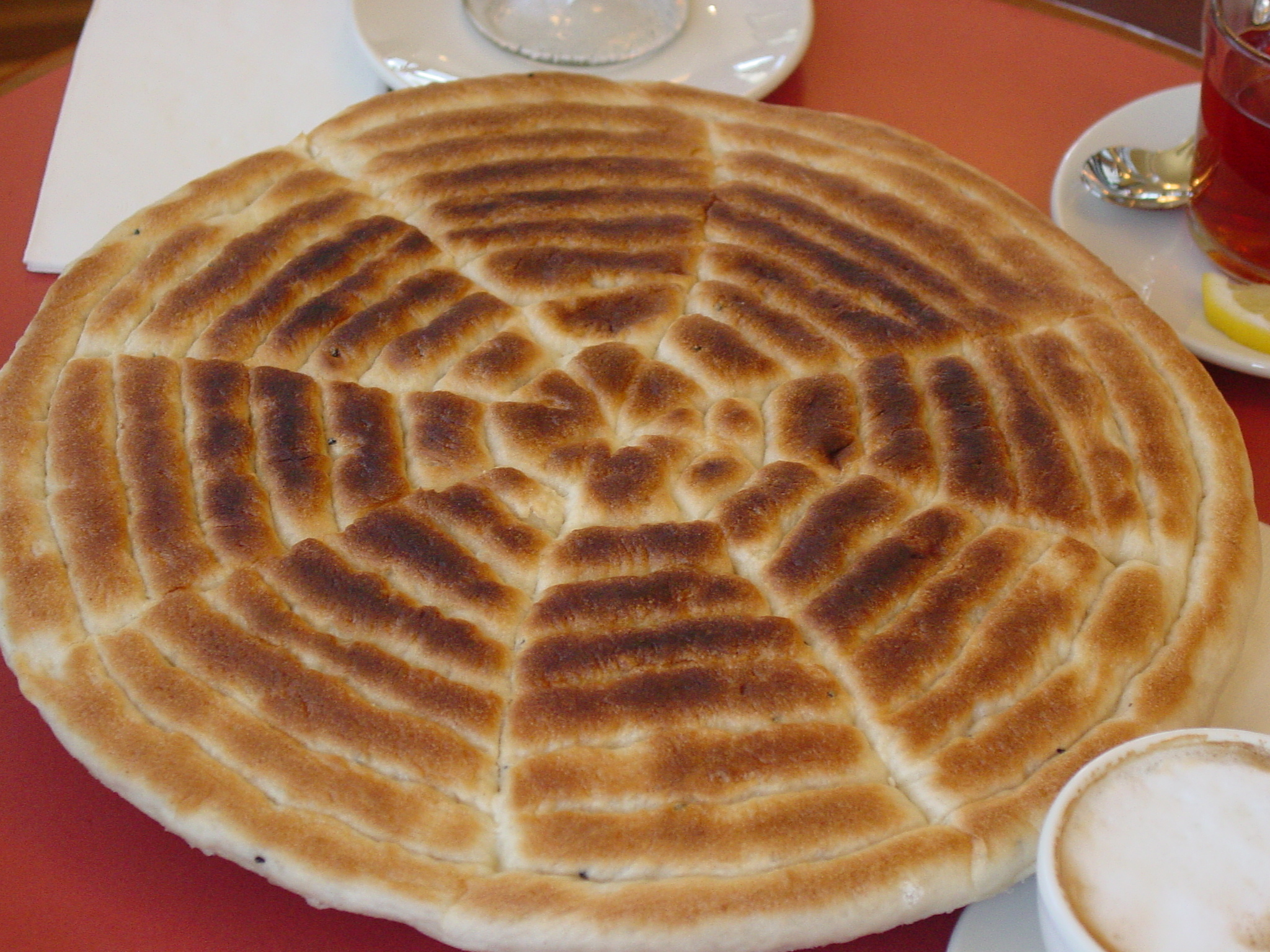
Ambasha is sometimes consumed as a snack during the ceremonies

The host pours the coffee for all participants by moving the tilted boiling pot over a tray with small, handleless china cups from a height of one foot without stopping until each cup is full. The grounds are brewed three times: the first round of coffee is called awel in Tigrinya, the second kale'i and the third baraka ('to be blessed'). In Amharic the terms are abol (አቦል), the second tona (ቶና) and the third baraka (በረካ). The coffee ceremony may also include burning of various traditional incense. People add sugar to their coffee, or in the countryside, sometimes salt or traditional butter (see niter kibbeh). The beverage is accompanied by a small snack such as popcorn, peanuts, or himbasha (also called ambasha).

== See also ==
- Tea ceremony
- Cuisine of Ethiopia
- Cuisine of Eritrea
