= Gored gored =

Ethiopian raw beef dish

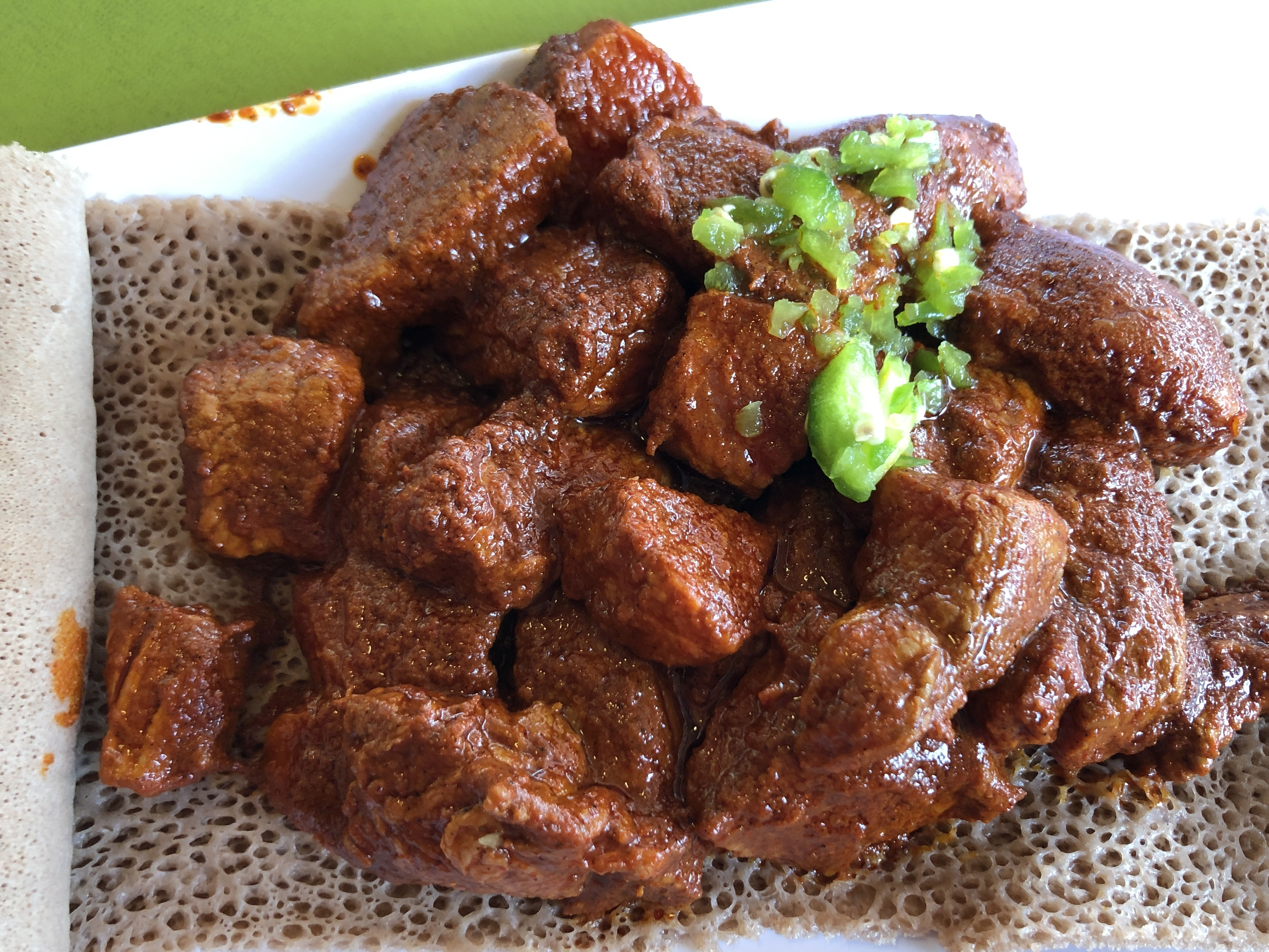
Gored gored on top of injera

Gored gored (Amharic: ጎረድ ጎረድ, romanized: goräd goräd; Amharic pronunciation: [ɡorəd ɡorəd] ), (Oromo: gurguddaa) is a raw beef dish eaten in Ethiopia. Whereas kitfo is minced beef marinated in spices and niter kibbeh (seasoned clarified butter), gored gored is cubed and left unmarinated. Like kitfo, it is widely popular and considered a national dish. It is often served with mitmita (a powdered seasoning mix) and awaze (a spicy condiment).

Although the dish is sometimes compared to kitfo, gored gored is prepared with cubed rather than minced beef and seasoned with berbere and awaze but not marinated. It is frequently served with injera flatbread, awaze chili sauce, and lemon wedges.

Usually, the fat is left on the meat and eaten with it. Gored gored can be served as a stand-alone dish or in combination with the aforementioned ingredients, but it can also be included in a larger dinner, particularly during festive occasions and festivals.

== See also ==
- Cuisine of Ethiopia
- Cuisine of Eritrea
- List of African dishes
- Steak tartare
