= Dabo kolo =

Ethiopian and Eritrean snack

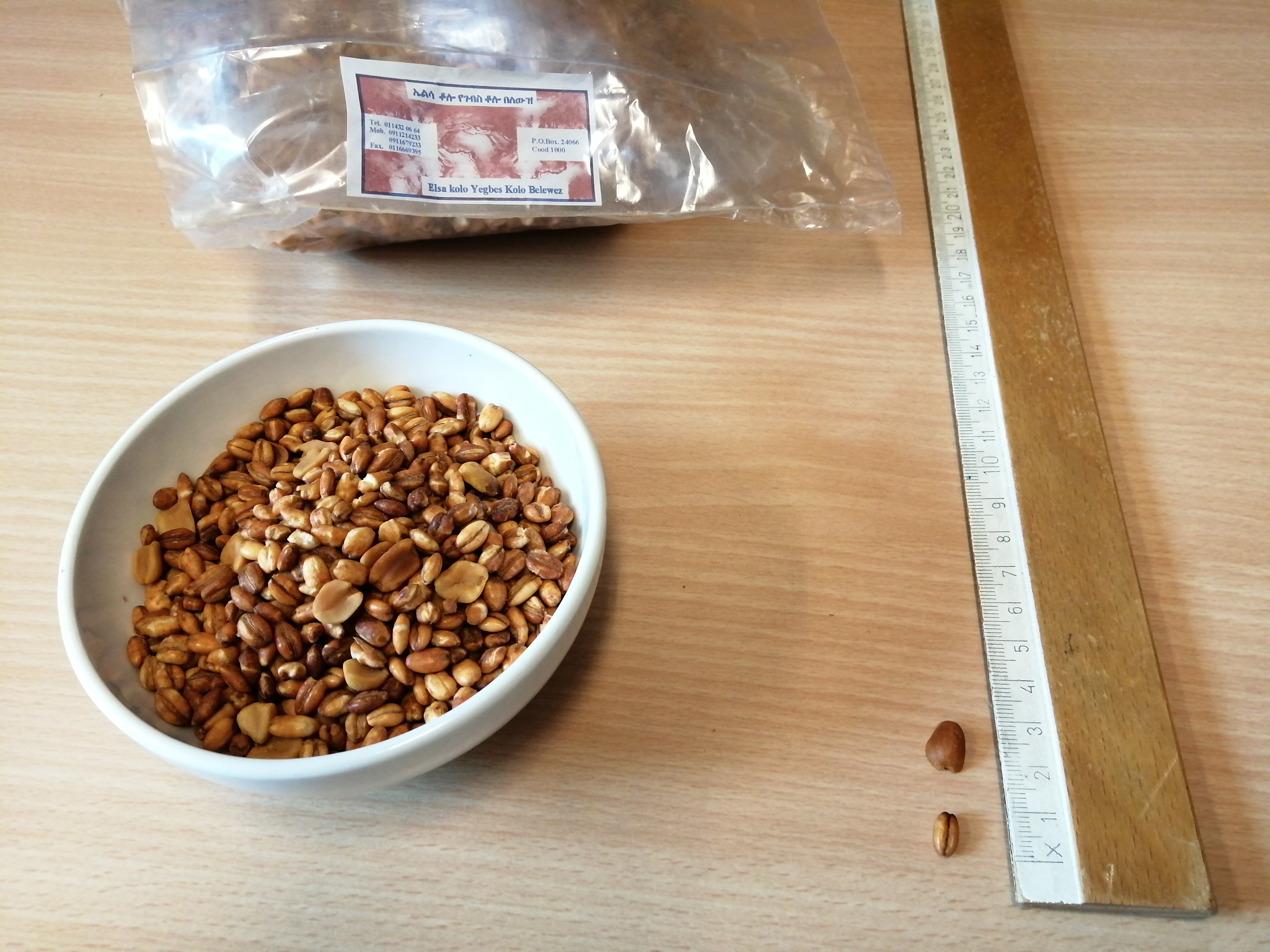
- Dabo kolo ( ዳቦ ቆሎ )
- Region or state: Ethiopia, Eritrea, Democratic Republic of the Congo
- Main ingredients: Flour, milk, barley
- Other information: For snacking or festivity

Dabo kolo (Amharic: ዳቦ ቆሎ, romanized: dabo qolo, lit. 'corn bread'; Oromo: Boqqolloo daabboo) is an Ethiopian and Eritrean snack and finger food consisting of small pieces of spiced fried dough. Dabo kolo means corn bread in the Amharic language, with dabo meaning "bread", and kolo meaning "corn" or a snack consisting of roasted grains, such as barley, chickpeas, sunflower seeds, or a combination.

Kolo bread wrapped in a paper cone is often sold by local kiosks and street vendors. It is prepared by frying small pieces of dough cut from rolls. Sometimes honey is added to make dabo kolo sweeter. Dabo kolo is also considered a Congolese finger food. A rare alternative recipe is dabo kolo made from coffee beans.

== Festivities ==
Dabo kolo is a special dish during the Ethiopian New Year festivities. It is traditionally served during Shabbat meals by the Beta Israel (Ethiopian Jews).

== See also ==
- List of Ethiopian and Eritrean dishes and foods
- Popcorn
