= International rankings of Eritrea =

International rankings of Eritrea

== Politics ==
- Transparency International 2019 Corruption Perceptions Index, ranked 160 out of 179
- Reporters Without Borders 2020 Press Freedom Index, ranked 178 out of 180 countries
- World Justice Project Rule of Law Index 2019, not ranked out of 126 countries
