= Jebena =

Traditional Ethiopian coffee pot

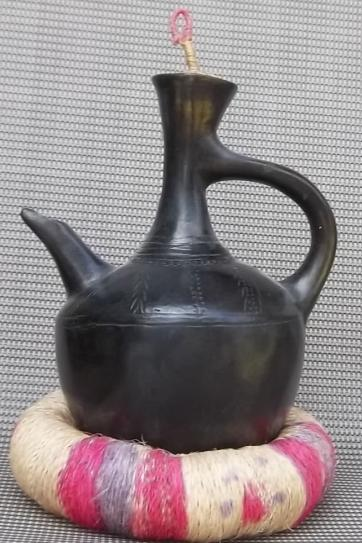
Traditional jebena from central Ethiopia, distinguished from Sudanese, northern Ethiopian and southern Eritrean pots by its spout

A jebena (Amharic: ጀበና, romanized: ǧäbäna, Arabic: جبنة, romanized: jabana) is a traditional Ethiopian and Eritrean ceramic coffee-brewing flask.

== Overview ==
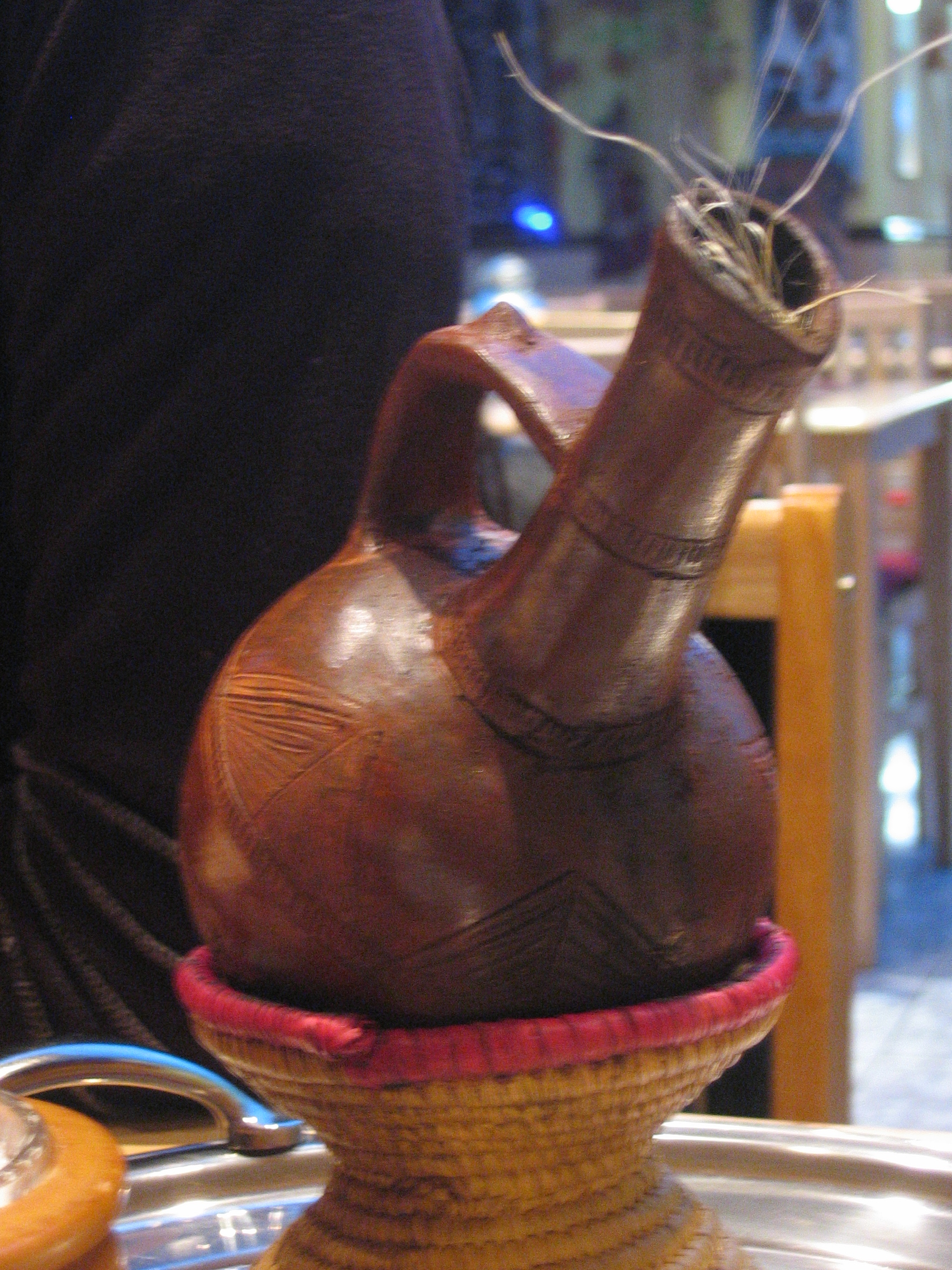
The northern Jebena has no spout and is used in Eritrea, Tigray, and Sudan.

In The Comforts of Coffee: The Role of the Coffee Ceremony in Ethiopians' Efforts to Cope with Social Upheaval during the Derg Regime (1974-1991), D. Daniel writes:

Arguably the most important feature of the ceremony is the jebena, the coffee pot. The jebena is made from clay and has a round bottom with a narrow spout and a handle on the side. Its shape and design are reflective of the ethnic identity of the host, whether it has a large bottom or an additional spout to pour out the coffee. While certain elements of the coffee ceremony can be tweaked, modernized or all together left out, the jebena has remained the center piece throughout Ethiopia and abroad.

Jebenas are roughly medium-sized. Their shapes are defined by the neck, pouring spout, and handle that connects the neck with the base. Ethiopian jebenas typically feature a separate spout lower on the pot for pouring out the coffee, which is not present on most Eritrean jebenas. Some regional variants may possess a differently shaped base, a straw lid, and/or an extra spout to pour the coffee out of.

The jebena is most commonly used in the coffee ceremony of Ethiopia and Eritrea, where women serve coffee to their guests in small clay or ceramic pots. It is considered a staple household object in Ethiopia, with decorations and designs being used to represent social status. It has a close association to the rich history of coffee in Ethiopia, where it is known as 'bunna' ቡና.

== History ==
The jebena holds a significant place in Ethiopian and Eritrean culture. Families will usually have only one, and it is normally passed down from generation to generation as a practical, ornate heirloom. The jebena can be described as an 'artifact', as well as a tool, as it represents significant shared cultural experience and status in Ethiopian and Eritrean culture.

== Prevalence ==
Outside of its originator peoples, the jebena is also popular in some parts of Egypt.

=== Ethiopia ===
Brewing coffee is tied closely to womanhood in Ethiopia and in the Horn of Africa. When brewing coffee with the jebena, the youngest woman of the family is always the one to initiate the process. Brewing coffee in the jebena is also a distinctly social event, where during the time it takes to prepare the beans and brew the coffee, families will socialise.

The ornate nature of a jebena makes it a coveted item for a family, with potters in Ethiopia often not having access to tools such as potter's wheels. As a result, a highly decorated jebena is a sign of wealth and status amongst families in Ethiopia and Eritrea.

Because of the ritualistic nature of the coffee ceremony, if a jebena is not used to prepare and boil the coffee, by all accounts, a coffee ceremony is not taking place.

A household would traditionally participate in the coffee ceremony three times a day, preparing a pot of coffee in the jebena each time. On each occasion, the woman preparing the coffee will announce to all persons in the household that it is taking place, and will invite people to enjoy the ritual before beginning to roast the beans and starting the process of making coffee in the jebena.

There is a small restaurant in Addis Ababa, Ethiopia, made in an image of an Ethiopian jebena figure.

=== Migrants of Ethiopia ===
The jebena is also tied closely to womanhood amongst migrant families. The jebena represents a delineated routine of the Ethiopian coffee ceremony such that migrant families' coffee ceremonies continue to necessitate it. The long time it takes to brew coffee in the jebena allows migrant families time to connect and furthers the collective identity women and families have built with their home nation.

== Appearance ==
The jebena has a long, neck-like spout, and a handle to pour with. The base of the jebena is normally large and circular, with a flat bottom so that it can balance on the surfaces without falling over. The top of the jebena is usually curved so that pouring in water and coffee grounds is easier. The neck of the spout in the jebena is intentionally very narrow, acting as a strainer so no grounds come out when pouring the coffee, so that the coffee requires less straining through a sieve.

It is normally placed on a small decorative cloth throne or on hay to stop its base, which has usually just been exposed to flames, from burning anything. There is also normally a plug at the top, made of cloth, straw or clay, to stop any water from spilling out. More modern jebena's may be made of porcelain or metal, resembling a more traditional western coffee pot. The size of the jebena is usually approximately 20–45 cm (7.9–17.7 in) tall. This is because it is normal to refill the jebena and brew more coffee multiple times in one coffee ceremony, so a large pot is not required.

The appearance of the jebena differs slightly between the regions of Ethiopia and East Africa; villages will often specialize in crafting jebenas of their own signature shape. Most commonly, jebenas are made of locally sourced clay collected by female elders. Among the upper class and royalty, gold and silver plating is also common, reflecting the usage of the jebena as a status or social symbol in Ethiopian society. Other decorations include the painting of the outside either with bright and varied colours or with traditional dot paintings.

Regional variations also exist, with different main styles, the Ethiopian and the Eritrean:

- The Ethiopian variant has a separate spout to pour the water into and a spout to pour the coffee out from. In some areas where butter is added to the coffee, jebenas may have two spouts.
- Eritrean variants of the jebena are made in a similar fashion, but only possess one spout for water to be poured in from, and for coffee to be poured out from.

The clay cups used to serve coffee are normally made of the same clay, and are decorated or presented in a similar manner to the jebena. In Ethiopia, these are known as sini ስኒ or finjal ፍንጃል.

== Usage ==
The jebena, containing ground, roasted coffee beans and water, is laid directly upon hot coals to bring the water to a brewing temperature. Typically, when the coffee boils up through the jebena's neck, it is poured in and out of another container to cool it. The liquid is then poured back into the jebena until it bubbles up. To pour the coffee from the jebena, a filter made from horsehair or other material is placed in the spout of the jebena to prevent the grounds from escaping. The advantage of the earthenware flask over metal and glass coffee-pots is that it keeps the liquid hot for a longer period of time.

Coffee is brewed in a jebena three times a day: in the morning, at noon and in the evening. The preparation of coffee often denotes a time intended for men and women to mingle and converse separately. The matriarch or the youngest woman of a household is traditionally the person who initiates the coffee ceremony and begins the process of preparing the coffee beans to be brewed in the jebena. Coffee beans are washed, roasted and then ground by women, and often mixed with spices before the coffee begins to be brewed.

Popcorn and other snacks may be passed around while the coffee beans are being roasted. Roasting and grinding may cumulatively take up to 45 minutes. After this, the coffee is brewed in the jebena, poured into small clay or porcelain cups through a sieve to catch the fine coffee ground, and served in three separate stages. These are known as the awel, kale'i, and baraka respectively. The multistage serving structure allows participants to sample three separate stages of brewing: the coffee is strong and potent in the first stage, becoming slightly less flavorful in each proceeding serving. In total all three stages usually take two hours.

In the context of a coffee ceremony, while the coffee is being prepared in the jebena, the orchestrating woman will often light incense to create a more relaxing atmosphere in the home and further complete the ritual of the coffee ceremony. The coffee is often prepared without sugar, butter or milk, and served from a tray of cups to participants seated on the ground.

== See also ==
- List of cooking vessels
