= Meskel =

Orthodox Tewahedo holiday

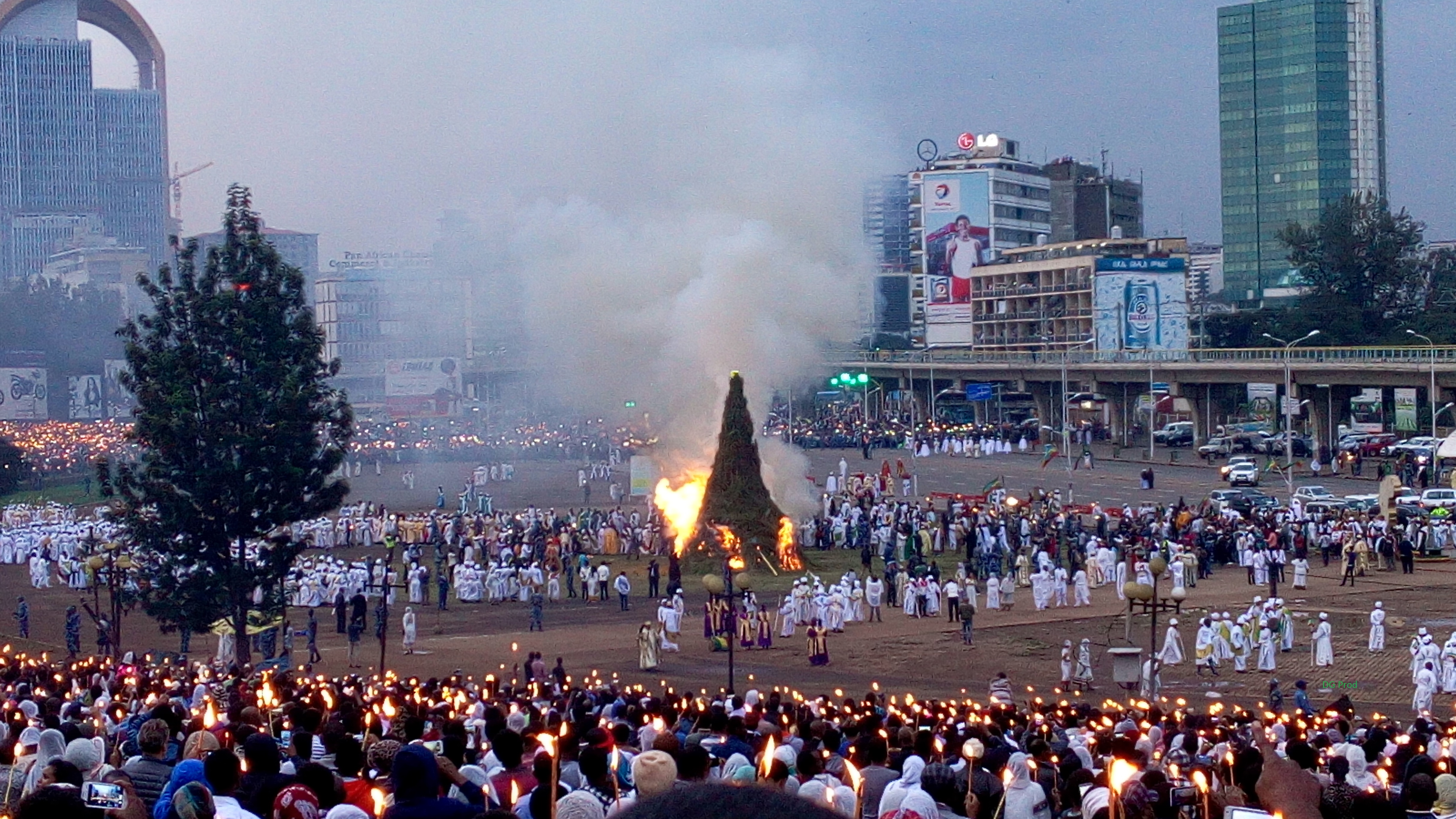
- Meskel celebration at Meskel Square, Addis Ababa (2016)
- Observed by: Oriental Orthodoxy – Orthodox Tewahedo; Ethiopian Orthodox Tewahedo Church; Eritrean Orthodox Tewahedo Church; Roman Catholicism – Eastern Catholicism; Ethiopian Catholic Church; Eritrean Catholic Church; Protestantism – Eastern Protestant Christianity; P'ent'ay – Ethiopian-Eritrean Evangelical Churches; Pentecostal, Lutheran, Baptist, Mennonite, and other Evangelical churches
- Significance: Commemorates the Feast of the Cross and the discovery of the True Cross by the Roman Empress Saint Helena of Constantinople in the fourth century.
- Celebrations: People gather and burn a torch natively called chibo in every locales; Fireworks fulmination; Party
- Date: 27 September; 28 September (leap year)
- 2026 date: 27 September
- Frequency: Annual

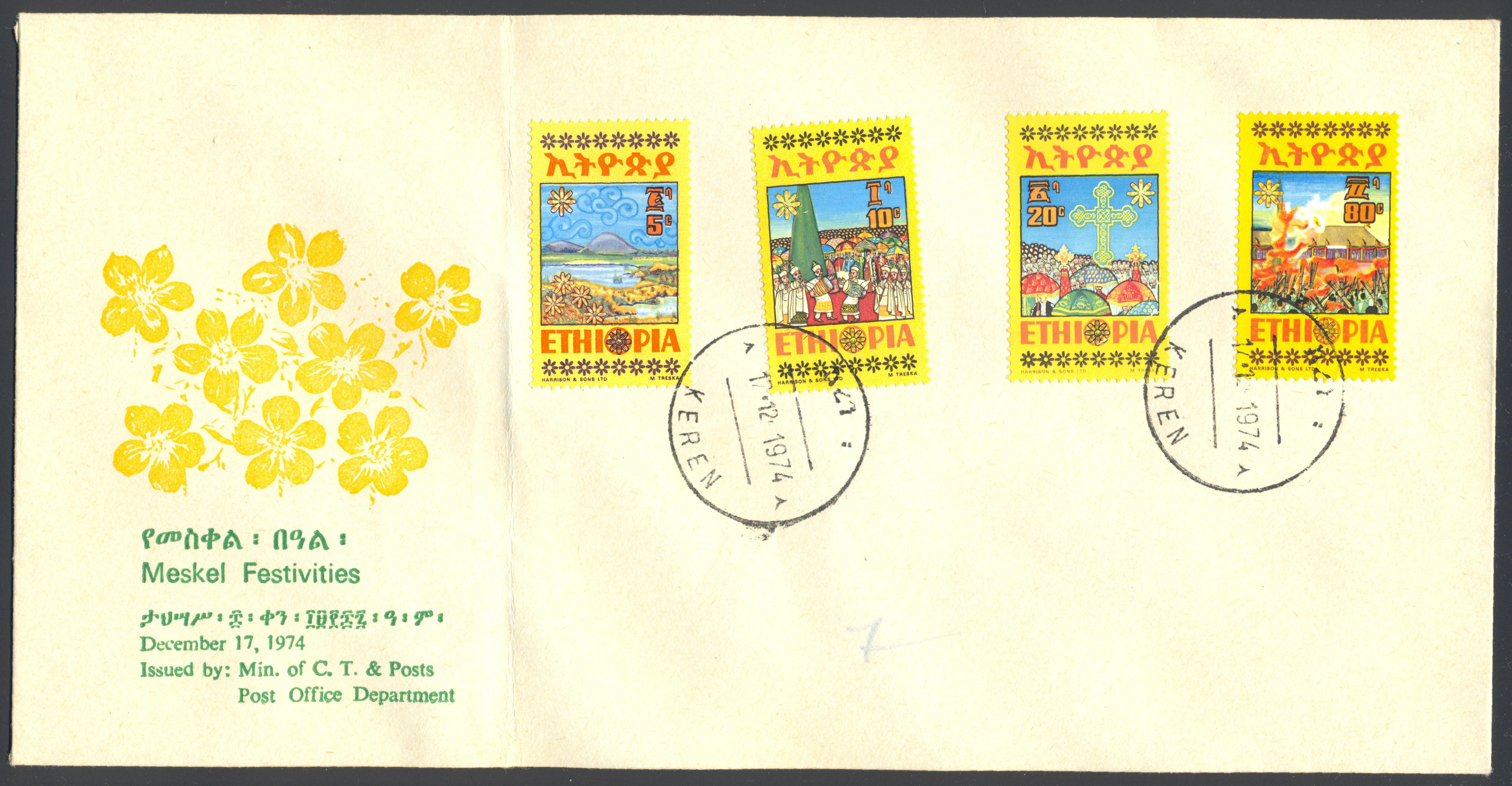
Postmarks commemorating Ethiopian First Day Cover, Meskel festivities, 17 December 1974

Meskel (Ge'ez: መስቀል, romanized: Mesk'el) is an Ethiopian and Eritrean Orthodox Tewahedo Church holiday that commemorates the discovery of the True Cross by the Roman Empress Saint Helena of Constantinople in the fourth century. Meskel is celebrated by Oriental Orthodox members of the Ethiopian Orthodox Tewahedo Church, the Eritrean Orthodox Tewahedo Church, and to a lesser extent Roman Catholic members of the Ethiopian Catholic Church, the Eritrean Catholic Church, and among Protestant members of P'ent'ay – Ethiopian-Eritrean Evangelicalism (including Pentecostal, Lutheran, Baptist, Mennonite, and other Evangelical churches). It is a localized version of the Feast of the Cross and occurs on the 17 Meskerem in the Ethiopian calendar (27 September, Gregorian calendar, or on 28 September in leap years). "Meskel" (or "Meskal" or "Mesqel", there are various ways to transliterate from Ge'ez to Latin script) is Amharic for "cross".

The feast is held in Meskel Square, named after the festival, in the capital city of Addis Ababa. Religious and civil leaders preside over the celebration, and public figures give speeches and reference biblical themes and stories. Many Ethiopians who live in cities return to their home villages to celebrate the national event. When darkness falls, the Demera is burned. UNESCO inscribed Meskel in 2013 on the Representative List of the Intangible Cultural Heritage of Humanity.

== Overview ==
The Meskel celebration includes the burning of a large bonfire, or Demera, based on the belief that Queen Eleni had a revelation in a dream. She was told that she should make a bonfire and that the smoke would show her where the True Cross was buried. So she ordered the people of Jerusalem to bring wood and make a huge pile. After adding frankincense, the bonfire was lit and the smoke rose high up to the sky and returned to the ground, exactly to the spot where the Cross had been buried.

According to local traditions, this Demera-procession takes place in the early evening the day before Meskel or on the day itself. The firewood is decorated with daisies prior to the celebration. Charcoal from the remains of the fire is afterwards collected and used by the faithful to mark their foreheads with the shape of a cross (compare Ash Wednesday). Edward Ullendorff records a number of beliefs of the meaning of Demera, with some believing that it "marks the ultimate act in the cancellation of sins, while others hold that the direction of the smoke and the final collapse of the heap indicate the course of future events – just as the cloud of smoke the Lord raised over the Tabernacle offered guidance to the children of Israel (Exod. 40:34–38)."

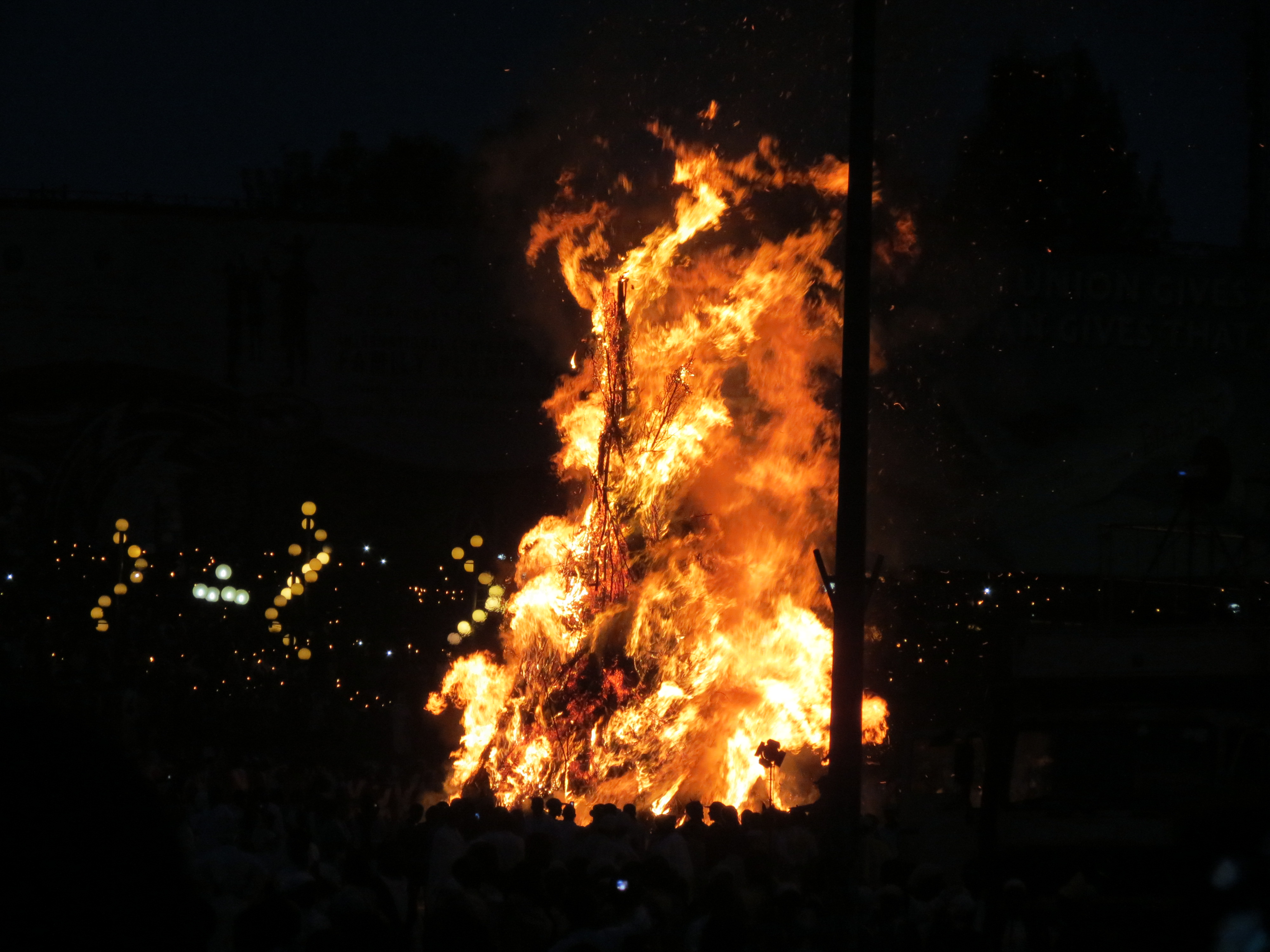
Demera engulfed in flames, 2013

One explanation for the high rank this festival has in the church calendar is that it is believed that a part of the true Cross has been brought to Ethiopia from Egypt. It is said to be kept at Amba Geshen, which itself has a cross-shaped plan.

According to the Ethiopian Orthodox Church, the discovery of the True Cross is traditionally believed to have been in March, but Meskel was moved to September to avoid holding a festival during Lent, and because the church commemorating the True Cross in Jerusalem was dedicated during September. Ullendorff speculates that Meskel replaced an older festival, with pagan and Hebraic associations, which he believes received its Christian sanction around the reign of Emperor Amda Seyon in the fourteenth century. "The most ancient meaning of these feasts – as was also the case in Israel – was no doubt seasonal: the month of Maskaram marked the end of the rains, the resumption of work, and the reopening of communications."
