= Amhara Cuisine =

Traditional food and eating culture of the Amhara people

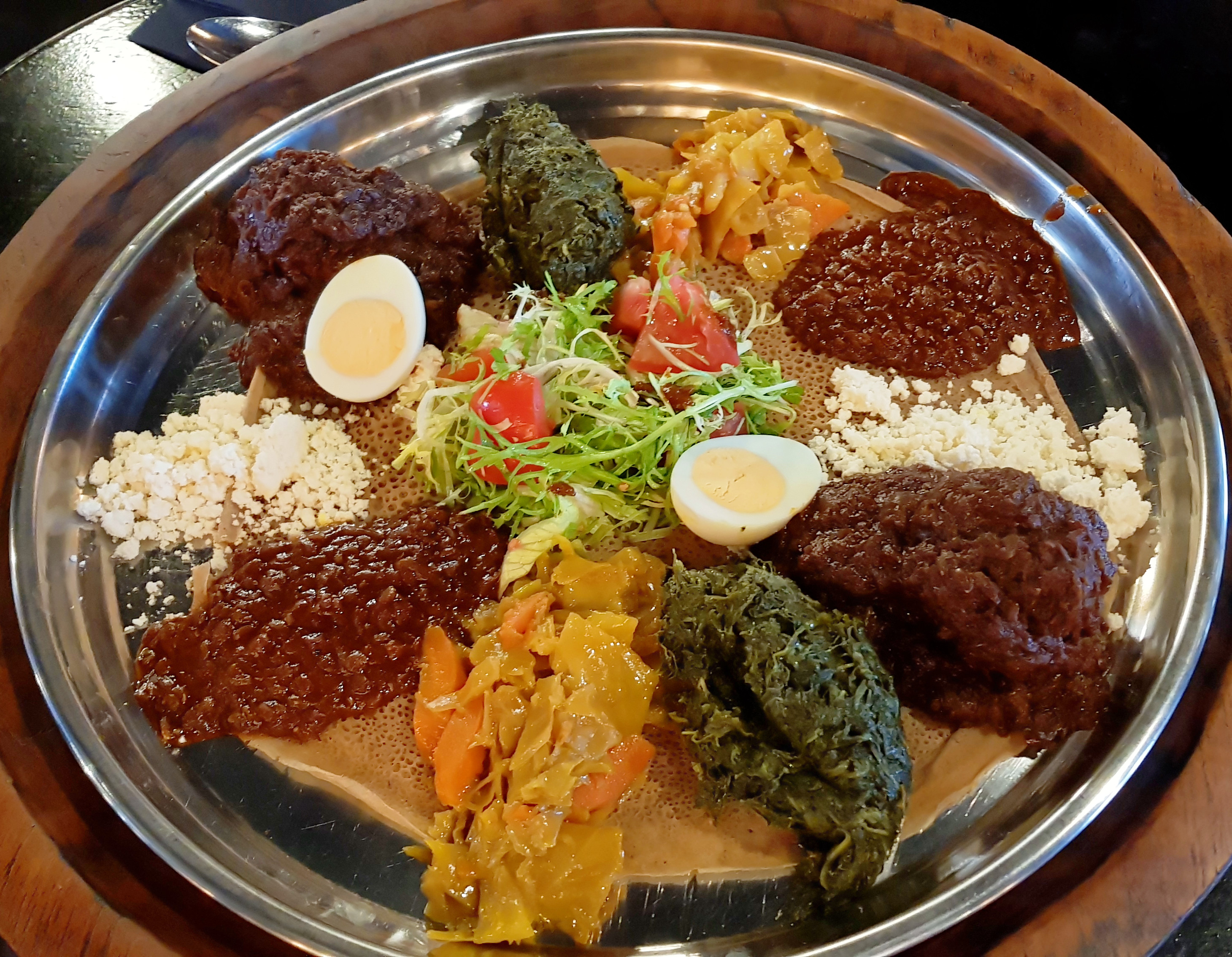
Injera served with wat

Amhara cuisine is the traditional food and eating culture of the Amhara people in Ethiopia. Injera, wat and traditional fermented drinks such as tej, tella and areki are central to Amhara dining.

Injera: This is a sour, spongy flatbread typically made from fermented teff flour, water, and a starter called ersho. It is baked on a round clay griddle called mitad or mugogo, creating small pores (eyes) on top.

Wat: This is a thick stew served on top of injera. Common versions include doro wot, shiro wat, sega wot.

Tej: A sweet and sour honey wine fermented with water and gesho leaves. It is traditionally associated with royal dining.

Tella: A cloudy, home-brewed beer made from malted barley (bikil), grains like sorghum or teff, and gesho.

Areki: A strong, clear liquor distilled from fermented grain dough and malted barley.
