= Fasika =

Ethiopian Easter

Fasika (Ge'ez: ፋሲካ, sometimes transcribed as Fasica; [ultimately from Aramaic פַּסְחָא (paskha)] is the Ge'ez, Amharic, and Tigrinya word for Easter, also called Tensae (Ge'ez: ትንሣኤ, "to rise").

In Ethiopia, the most prominent and longstanding religion has been the Ethiopian Orthodox Tewahedo Church (then including the Eritrean Orthodox Tewahedo Church) since the times of Frumentius. Ethiopian (Ethio-Eritrean, Eastern) Easter, or Fasika, however, takes place in all the Christian Churches throughout the country, whether it be Orthodox, Catholic, or Protestant, and follows the eastern method of calculating Easter (see Computus for details), thus tending to fall after Easter in the Western calendar (some years both fall on the same date). Fasika is a much more important festival than Christmas, since the Death and Resurrection of Jesus is more significant in Orthodox and Ethiopian Evangelical theology than his birth. Jesus' crucifixion which led to his death on a Friday, according to Orthodox thought was for the purpose of fulfilling the word of God, and led to the conquest of death and Jesus' resurrection from the tomb after three days, the third day being the Sunday when Ethiopian Easter is celebrated.

Fasika is a climactic celebration. Fasting becomes more intense over the 55-day period of Lent for Orthodox Christians, Catholics and optionally for some Protestant denominations, when no meat or animal products of any kind, including milk and butter, are eaten. Good Friday starts off by church going, and is a day of preparation for the breaking of this long fasting period.

The Orthodox Christians prostrate themselves in church, bowing down and rising up until they get tired. The main religious service takes place with the Paschal Vigil on Saturday night. It is a somber, sacred occasion with music and dancing until midnight when the congregation makes the proclamation of Christ’s Resurrection. Divine liturgy begins and for many of the congregation, they will be receiving the Eucharist after not eating/drinking for 3 days. At 3:00 a.m. everyone returns home to break their fast, and a chicken is slaughtered at midnight for the symbolic occasion. In the morning, after a rest, a sheep is slaughtered to start the feasting on Easter Sunday. While Catholics and Protestant denominations have special Easter Services/Masses bringing in people from various smaller community churches together to participate in an Easter sermon and celebration.

In Ethiopian-Eritrean Orthodox Christianity or the Tewahedo faith, it is believed the near-sacrifice of Abraham's loved son Isaac (Genesis 22), which was a test of faith from God to Abraham, was interrupted by a voice of an angel from the heavens, and the sending of a Lamb for the sacrifice instead. This Old Testament story is said to be a prophetic foreshadowing of God sending his only beloved son for the world as a sacrifice and the fulfilling of Abraham's promise.

Easter in Ethiopia, Eritrea, and its diaspora communities, is a day when people celebrate; there is a joyous atmosphere after the long build-up of suffering which has taken place, to follow Christ's fasting for forty days and forty nights and suffering at the Cross. There is a 50 day period after the Resurrection Feast where there is no fasting or prostration, until the Fast of the Apostles. People often have food and for some Orthodox Christians locally brewed alcohol from fresh honey (tej, tella and katikalla), while to a certain extent Ethiopian-Eritrean Protestantism generally discourages heavy alcohol.

Ethiopians and Eritreans in the West especially those of the Catholic and Protestant denominations celebrate Easter on both the Eastern and Western days. While most Ethiopian-Eritrean Orthodox Christians in the West refrain from doing so because celebrating the Western Easter celebration would interfere with the Orthodox Fasting Season. In most cases the Catholic Western Fasting Season ends earlier than the Orthodox Fasting Season as can be seen in the difference between when the Eastern and Western Churches celebrate Easter (Fasika).

== See also ==
- Names of Easter
