= Otostegia integrifolia =

Scientific classification
- Kingdom: Plantae
- Clade: Tracheophytes
- Clade: Angiosperms
- Clade: Eudicots
- Clade: Asterids
- Order: Lamiales
- Family: Lamiaceae
- Genus: Otostegia
- Species: O. integrifolia

Binomial name
- Otostegia integrifolia Benth.

Synonyms
- Rydingia integrifolia (Benth.) Scheen & V.A. Albert

Species of flowering plant

Otostegia integrifolia, more commonly known as Abyssinian rose, a plant belonging to the family Lamiaceae, is endemic to Ethiopia, in the dry evergreen woodlands of the Bale Mountains, Tigray, Gondar, Wollo and Gojjam regions, North Shewa, Kaffa and Hararghe regions, as well as in the dry and moist agroclimatic zones of the district known as Dega, at altitudes of 1,300—2,800 m. above sea-level. It also grows in Yemen, northwest of Mukalla. In Ethiopia, O. integrifolia is commonly known by its Amharic vernacular of tinjute = ጥንጁት (alt. sp. Tindjut).

== Description ==
A much-branched shrub, growing to a height of 4 m; the stem angled and older stems ash grey and flaking, often bearing paired spines at the nodes. Leaves are simple, nearly sessile, ob-lanceolate to lanceolate, 2–9 cm long, cuneate at the base, clothed on both sides with white tomentum; aromatic, the edge double toothed or round toothed. Flowers are two-lipped with yellow or yellow-orange lower petal and white or cream-colored upper petals, the orange anthers held inside the upper petal. Whorls few or many, 5–6-flowered; bracts rigid, tricuspidate. Calyx sessile; tube 1/4 in. long, densely pubescent, with 10 raised ribs; upper lip small, oblong, pointed, entire; lower orbicular-cuneate, 3/4 in. broad, faintly crenate.

== Chemistry and pharmacology ==
By using analytical and preparative gas chromatography (GC), terpenes have been extracted from air-dried Abyssinian rose (Otostegia integrifolia) leaves. A total of 40 constituents including monoterpenes, sesquiterpenes, diterpenes and their derivatives were identified.

== Scientific and medicinal uses ==
The species of Otostegia have traditionally been used in folklore medicines, for treatment of ophthalmia, as an anti-microbial, antihyperglycaemic, and for its anti-oxidant properties used in preventing different kinds of sickness and disorders, of which five species have been reported in the flora of Ethiopia. Several studies suggest that O. integrifolia is a good natural anti-oxidant that can be used as health-promoting agent for various disorders including diabetes mellitus. The species O. integrifolia is well known for its pleasant odor, omnipotent medicinal values, and when its wood is fumigated has proven insecticidal properties (mosquito repellent).

== Other traditional uses ==
The wood of the Abyssinian rose (O. integrifolia) has insecticidal properties and is often gathered and burnt to fumigate homes, the aroma from the smoke being similar to perfume. Some upturn earthenware brewing jars directly over the smoke emitted from the burning wood, in order to absorb its flavor and to impart the same to an alcoholic beverage to be stored in the jars. The beverage, known locally as tella, is made from a bath of malted barley to which a batch of hops is later added, derived from the ground leaves of gesho for fermenting, being a species of buckthorn (Rhamnus prinoides). A smoldering coal from either olive wood or the Abyssinian rose wood is also put within ceramic jars used to contain milk, so as to impart its flavor to the milk. Some say that the smoke is used in this case as a disinfectant and to extend the shelf-life of the product. The wood is often collected as firewood, and used for scenting cloth material.

In Ethiopia, mothers after childbirth are smoked with tinjute on the tenth day after giving birth (postpartum). This was believed to “cleanse” the birthing mother so that she could leave her confinement and again resume a normal daily life.

Another plant bearing the name tinjute in Ethiopia is Combretum collinum, although it is unrelated to Abyssinian rose (O. integrifolia).
