= Siwa (beer) =

Beer originated from Tigray, Ethiopia and Eritrea

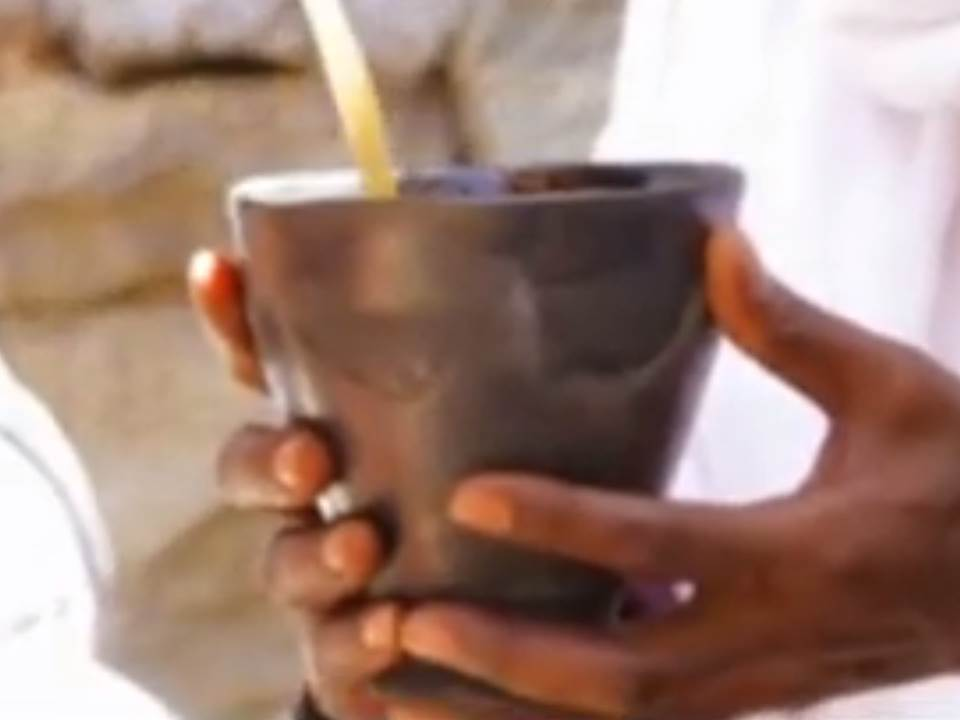
- Location: Tigray, Zoba Debub, Ethiopia, Eritrea
- Annual production volume: Est. 400,000 hectolitres (340,000 US bbl)

Active beers
Name	Type
Siwa	faro (beer)
Meknen	strong beer
Gu’esh	almost non-alcoholic
Korofieh	afroalpine beer

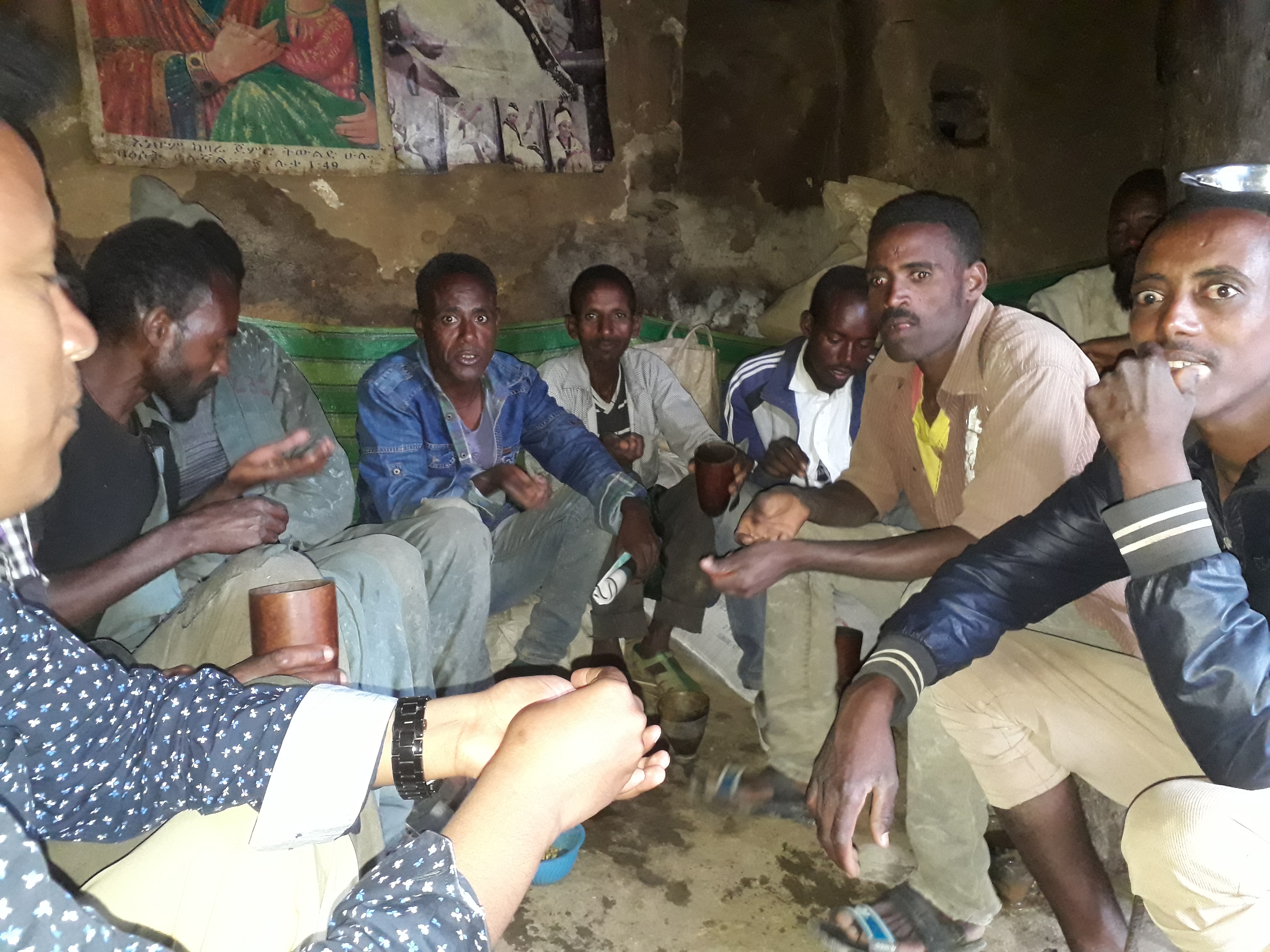
Socialising in an Inda Siwa, the local beer house

Siwa (or Suwa) (Tigrinya: ሰዋ, romanized: säwa), Amharic: ጠላ, is a beer originating from Eritrea and Ethiopia. Traditionally home-brewed, siwa remains locally popular during social events, after (manual) work, and as an incentive for farmers and labourers. Thousands of traditional beer houses (Enda Siwa) straddle the Tigrayan urban and rural landscapes.

== Siwa, the traditional beer of Tigray ==
In almost every rural household of Tigray, the woman knows how to prepare the local beer, siwa in Tigrinya language. Basic ingredients are water; a home-baked and toasted flatbread commonly made from barley in the highlands, and from sorghum, finger millet or maize in the lowlands; some yeast (Saccharomyces cerevisiae); and dried leaves of gesho (Rhamnus prinoides) that serve as a catalyst. The brew is allowed to ferment for a few days, after which it is served, sometimes with the pieces of bread floating on it (the customer will gently blow them to one side of the beaker). The alcoholic content is 2% to 5%. Siwa has a smoky flavour (originating from the toasted bread) and a typical sourness, bitterness, and sweetness (pH between 4 and 5). Most of the coarser part of the brew, the atella, remains back and is used as cattle feed.

== Variants ==
- A stronger version of siwa is called meknen, locally also filter, lifter or tselim siwa, which may reach an alcoholic content of 6% and beyond
- The softer version, often a secondary brew, is called gu'esh
- In the highland parts of Tigray and Amhara (often above elevations of 3000 metres), a light version, with the consistency of injera dough is taken particularly as breakfast; it is called korofieh
- In Amharic the siwa is called talla, and in Oromiffaa and Raya Tigrinya farso
- Myes, or in Amharic tej, is a similar alcoholic brew based on honey and is the Ethiopian version of mead. Myes is produced and consumed in mead houses (inda myes or tej bet). The brew is typically served in long-necked glass bottles.

== Siwa drinking style ==
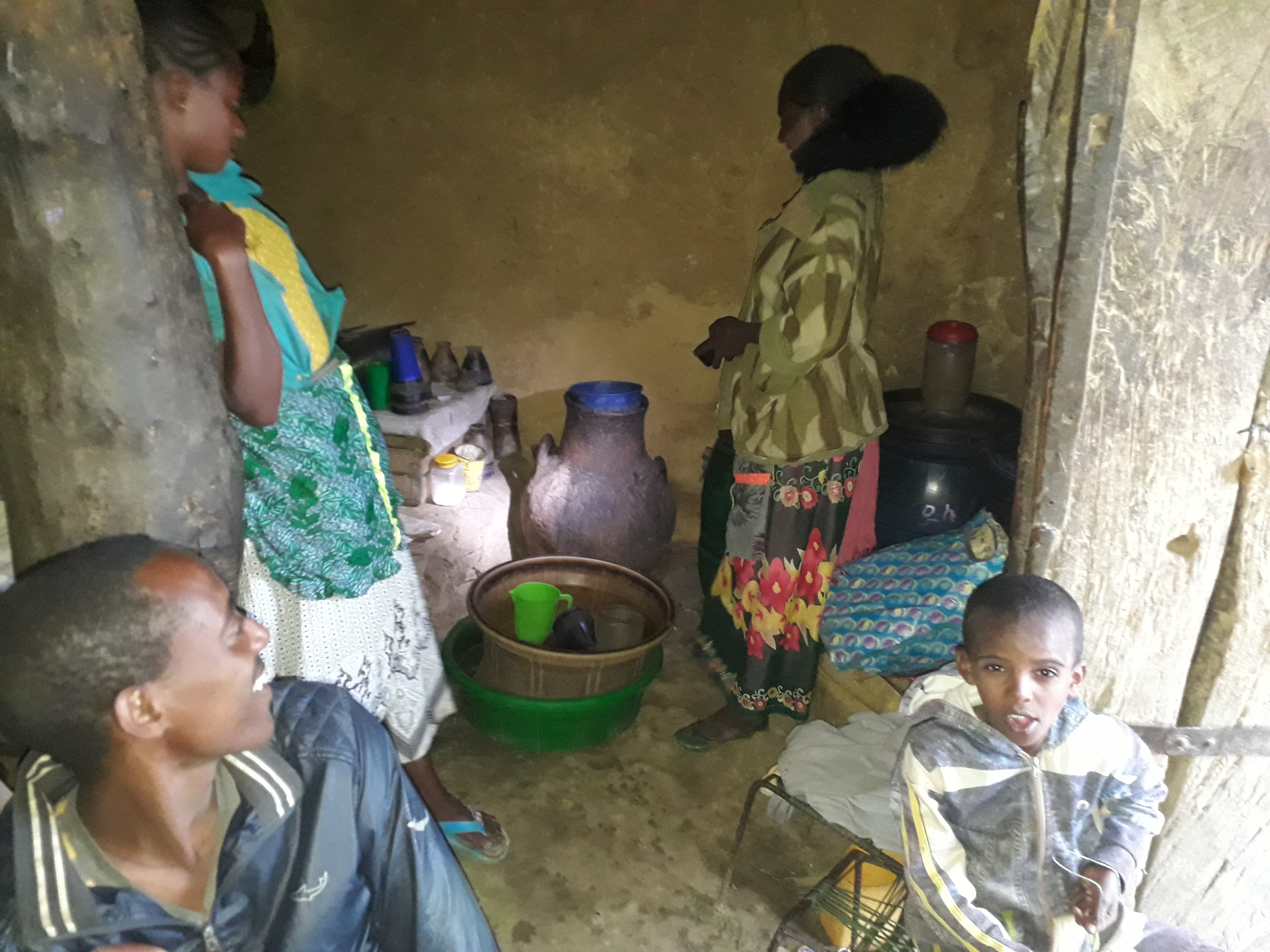
Typical setup for siwa serving: the beer is served from the clay vase (etriro), beakers of various facture on the shelf (clay, gourd, plastic, tin); at left the central wooden column (amdi) of the hidmo house, and at right part of the wooden door

=== Receptacles ===
The three traditional bowls in which siwa is served are: clay beakers (shekhla or wancha), hollowed gourds, and, less frequently, cattle horns. Recently, plastic or metal beakers and tins have become much used. Meknen is commonly served in one-litre glass bottles. The siwa itself is conserved in large clay vases, called etriro, which tend to get replaced with plastic drums. In the hotter lowlands, the etriro continues to be used because it has the particularity to keep the brew fresh.

=== In daily life ===
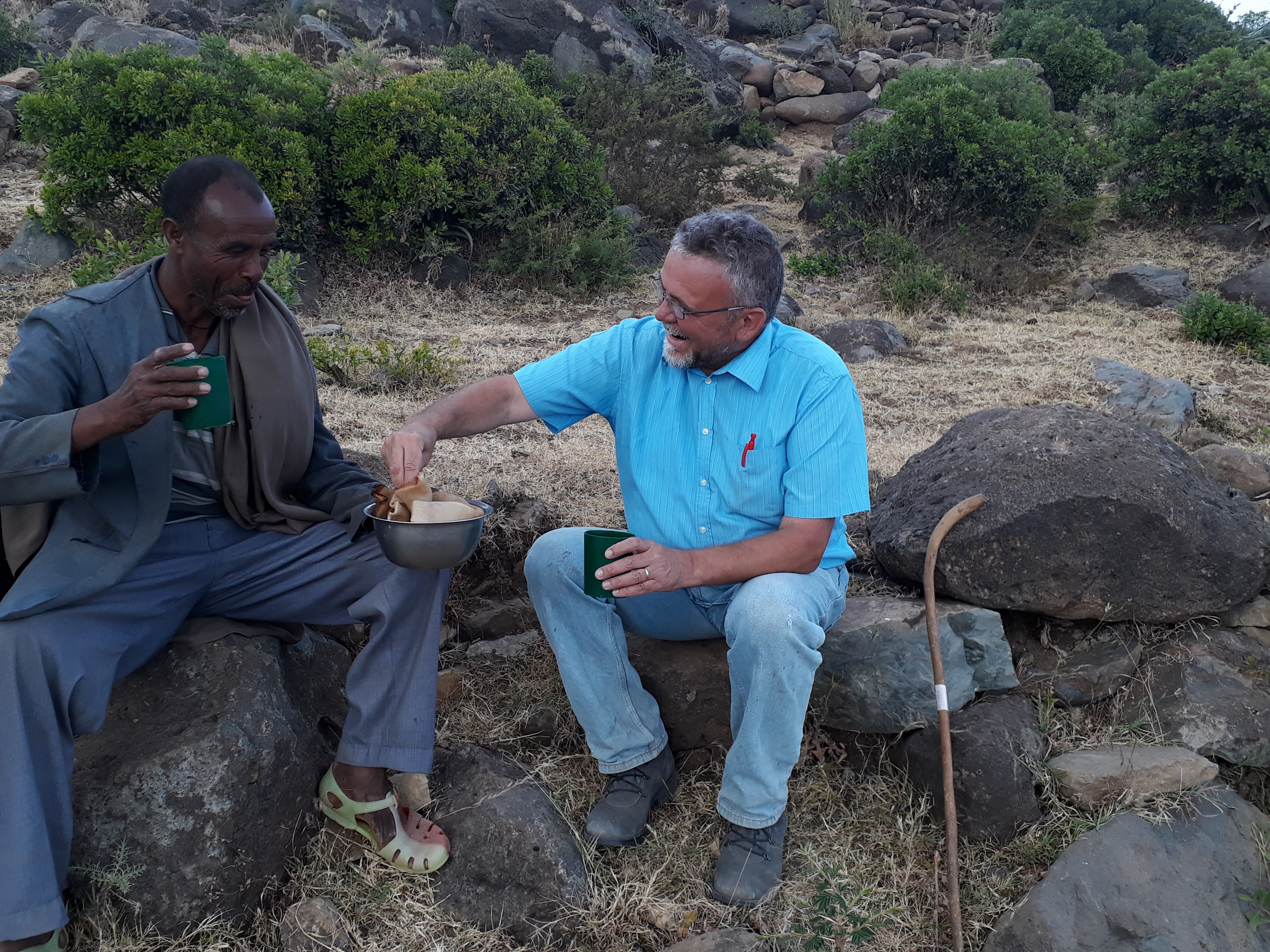
Invitation for siwa and injera on a farm field in Lafa, Dogu’a Tembien

When farmers go to plough their land, and even more when threshing their crops, there will always be siwa for the whole crew of farmers. Typically, the construction owner will also serve siwa to the labourers at house construction sites.

=== Social events ===
Siwa is traditionally served at every social event (baptisms, marriages, graduations, etc.). Typically, the cups are filled up to the edge, and the party's organizer will ensure that they are refilled before the guest can empty their cup.

== Inda Siwa, the traditional beer house ==
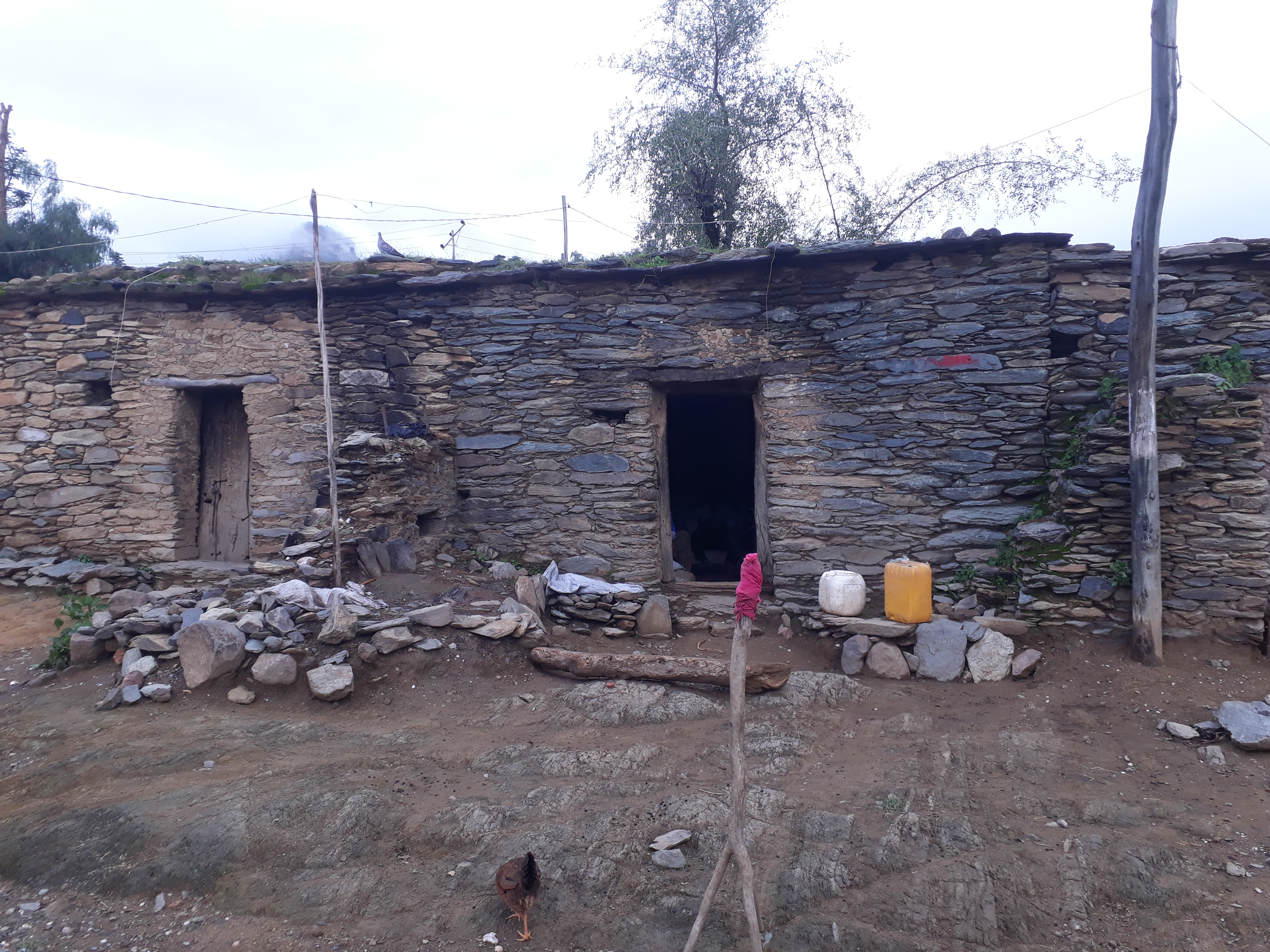
Inda Siwa at Werqamba, Tembien. The red cloth (sometimes a beaker or even a sheet of paper) indicates that siwa is available

Almost every settlement in Tigray holds one or more Inda Siwa, which serve as local bars and which generate off-farm income. Low seats are foreseen around the walls of the room; people drink in group and chat while sipping their siwa. Commonly after some drinks, tongues get loose. If a newcomer joins the group of customers, all will politely welcome him and invite him to sit with them. The owner of the business, mostly a woman, tallies the number of consumptions per customer and may get help from the customers to do her accounting. Frequently, adolescent boys or girls drop in to sell kollo (roasted grains) or buqulti (germinated beans) seasoned with senafiche (home-made mustard). The consumption of these snacks will stimulate the customer to order additional siwa. Smaller inda siwa open only on fixed days of the week, but in any case, all inda siwa will be open on (the eve of) market days.

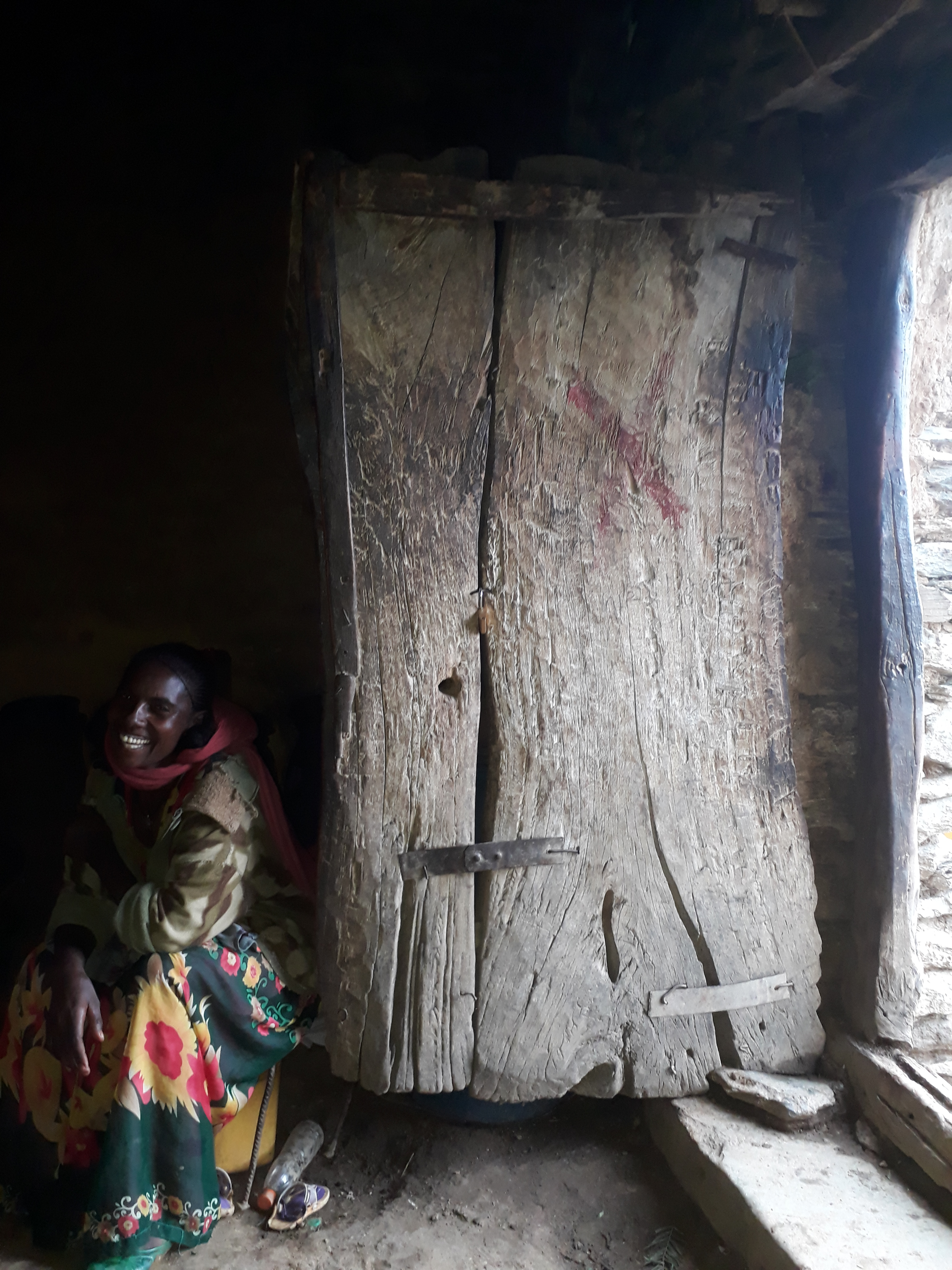
In Inda Siwa, one may often admire vernacular architecture – here the wooden door of a hidmo house

Many Inda Siwa are established in traditional houses, built in natural stone, with a heavy roof of stones and earth (hidmo), a central wooden column (amdi), and a wooden door. Visiting inda siwa is a unique occasion of admiring the traditional house building style of the Tigrayans.

== Competition by industrial beers ==
As living standards increase, the wealthier farmers frequently prefer drinking lager beer. Industrial breweries have seen this emerging market and prepared specific brands targeted at farmers: Balageru (meaning: "the rural people") and Azmera beers (meaning: "good cropping season"). Yet, siwa remains popular; a 2014 music video clip, "Siwa Embeytey", documents the production process and the social function of siwa.
