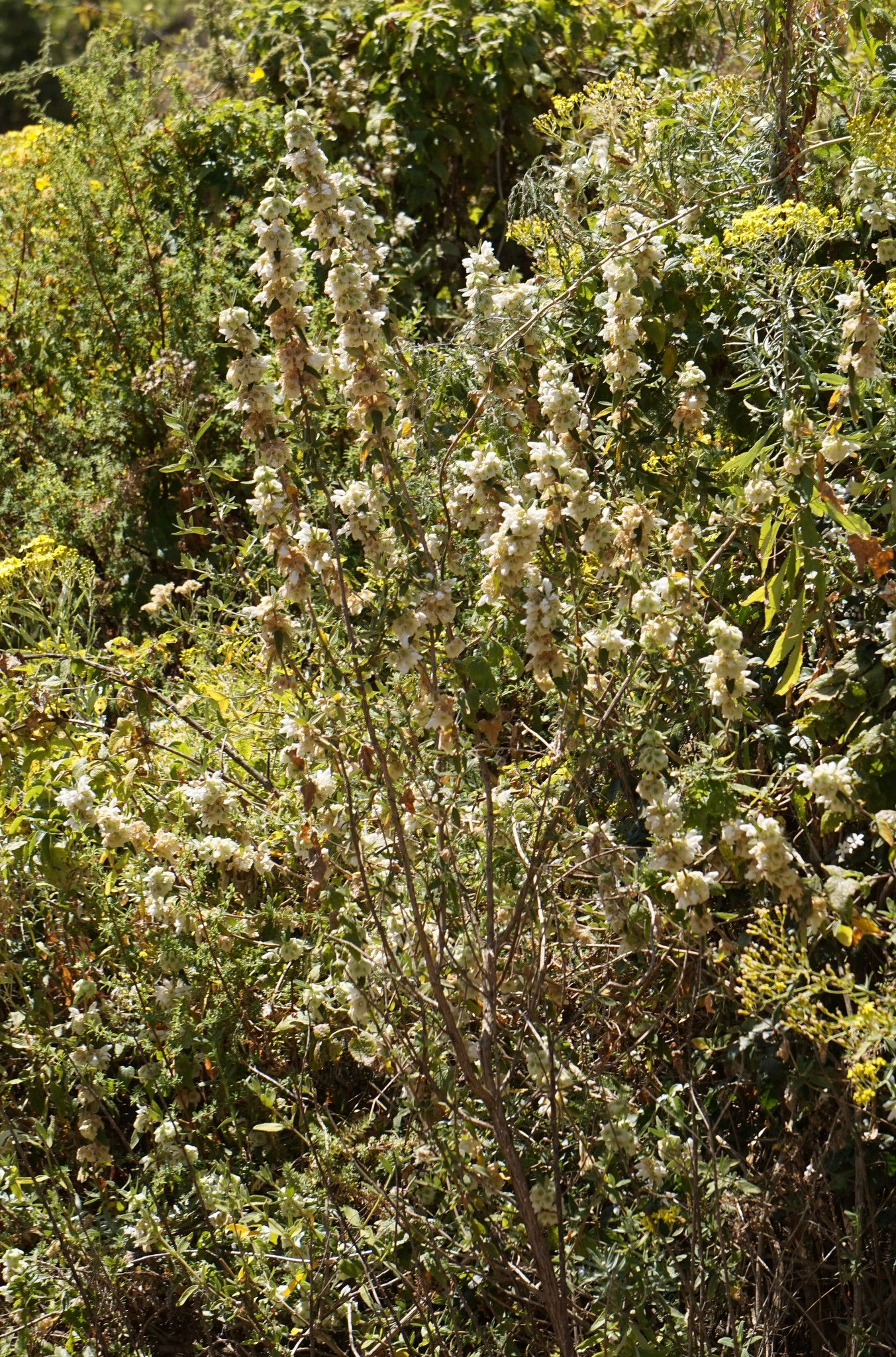
- Otostegia fruticosa

Scientific classification
- Kingdom: Plantae
- Clade: Tracheophytes
- Clade: Angiosperms
- Clade: Eudicots
- Clade: Asterids
- Order: Lamiales
- Family: Lamiaceae
- Subfamily: Lamioideae
- Genus: Otostegia; Benth.

Synonyms
- Dictilis Raf.

= Otostegia =

Genus of flowering plants

Otostegia is a genus of flowering plants in the family Lamiaceae, first described in 1834. It is native to eastern Africa and the Middle East.

Species

1. Otostegia ellenbeckii Gürke - Ethiopia
2. Otostegia ericoidea Ryding - Somalia
3. Otostegia erlangeri Gürke - Ethiopia + Somalia
4. Otostegia fruticosa (Forssk.) Schweinf. ex Penzig - Cameroon, Sudan, Ethiopia, Eritrea, Djibouti, Saudi Arabia, Yemen, Israel, Sinai, Palestine, Jordan
5. Otostegia hildebrandtii (Vatke & Kurtz) Sebald - Somalia
6. Otostegia integrifolia Benth. - Ethiopia + Yemen
7. Otostegia migiurtiana Sebald - Somalia
8. Otostegia modesta S.Moore - Ethiopia + Somalia
9. Otostegia tomentosa A.Rich - Ethiopia + Somalia + Sudan
