= Names of Easter =

Names in Christian traditions

The Christian holiday Easter has several names. The names differ depending on languages, but most are derived from Greek and Latin "pascha", which is taken from the Hebrew פֶּסַח (Pesach), meaning Passover. The modern English term Easter developed from the Old English word Ēastre or Ēostre (Old English pronunciation: [ˈæːɑstre, ˈeːostre]), which itself developed prior to 899, originally referring to the name of the Anglo-Saxon goddess Ēostre.

== English Easter and related ==
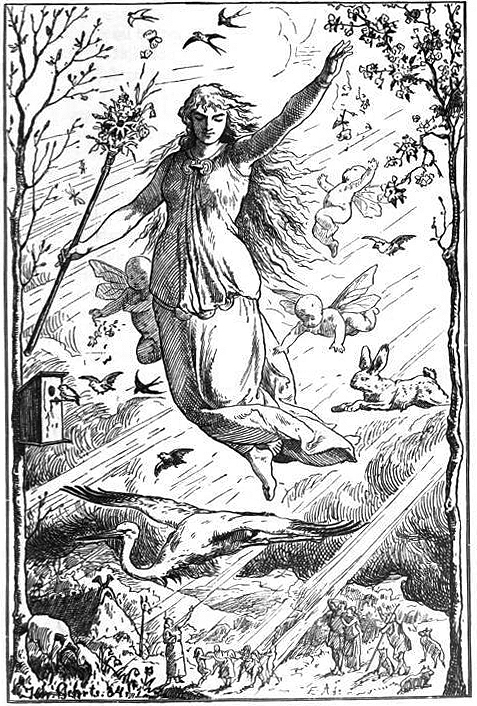
Ostara (1884) by Johannes Gehrts

Old English Eōstre continues into modern English as Easter and derives from Proto-Germanic *austrōn, itself a descendant of the Proto-Indo-European root *aus-, meaning 'to shine' (modern English east also derives from this root).

Writing in the 8th century, the Anglo-Saxon monk Bede describes Ēostre as the name of an Old English goddess and behind the name "Eosturmonath", the equivalent of the month of April. Bede is the only source commenting on this goddess.

Since the 19th century, numerous linguists have observed that the name is linguistically cognate with the names of dawn goddesses attested among Indo-European language-speaking peoples. By way of historical linguistics, these cognates lead to the reconstruction of a Proto-Indo-European dawn goddess; the Encyclopedia of Indo-European Culture (1997) details that "a Proto-Indo-European goddess of the dawn is supported both by the evidence of cognate names and the similarity of mythic representation of the dawn goddess among various [Indo-European] groups” and that “all of this evidence permits us to posit a [Proto-Indo-European] *h_{a}éusōs 'goddess of dawn' who was characterized as a "reluctant" bringer of light for which she is punished. In three of the [Indo-European] stocks, Baltic, Greek and Indo-Iranian, the existence of a [Proto-Indo-European] 'goddess of the dawn' is given additional linguistic support in that she is designated the 'daughter of heaven'."

== From Greek Pascha ==
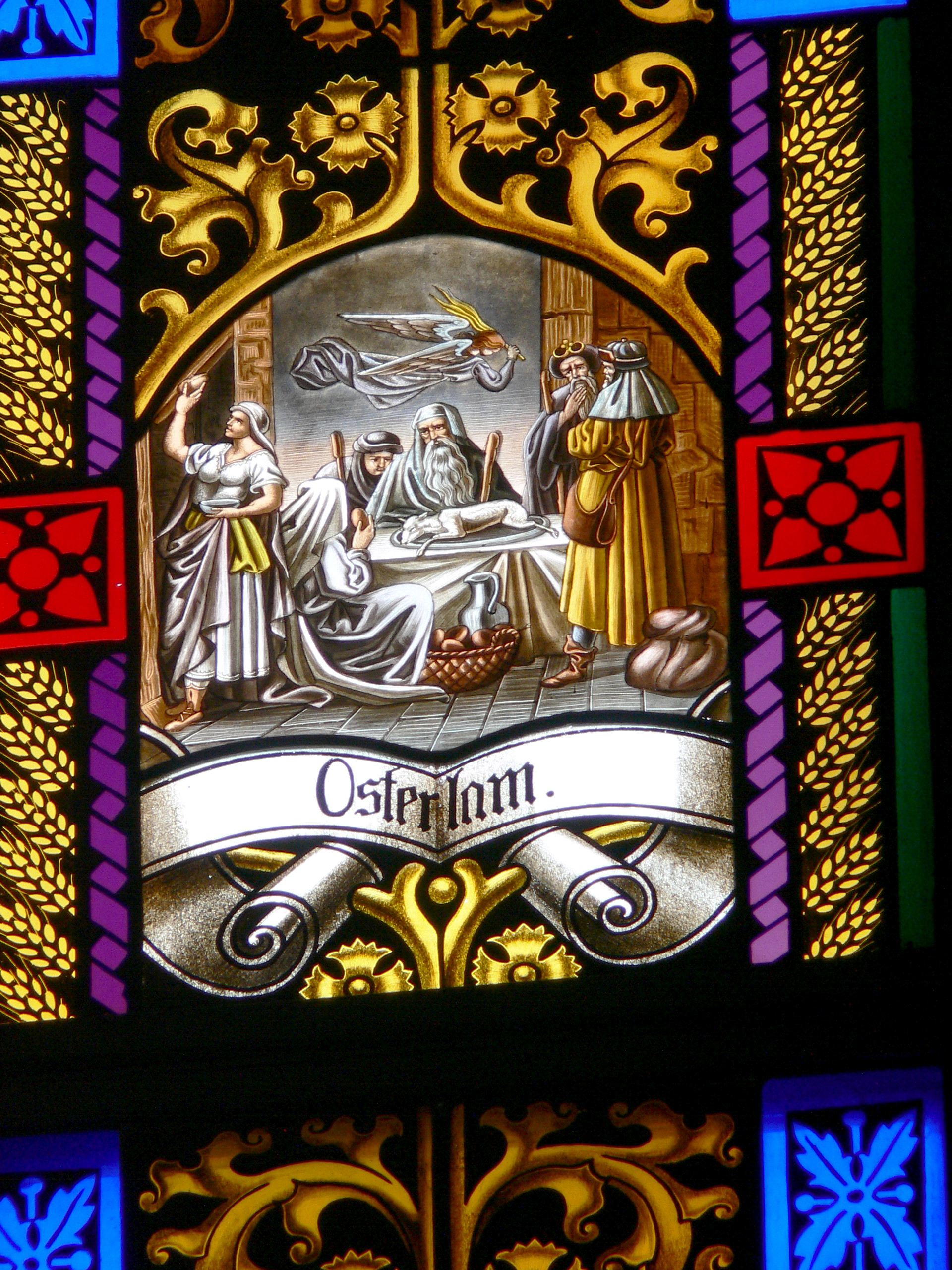
A stained-glass window depicting the Passover Lamb, a concept integral to the foundation of Easter

The festival that early Christians celebrated was called in Greek Πάσχα (Pascha), a transliteration of the Aramaic word פסחא, cognate to Hebrew פֶּסַח (Pesach). The word originally designated the Passover feast of Exodus 12. Paul writes from Ephesus that "Christ our Pascha (Passover) has been sacrificed for us", doubtless not the first interpretation of Exodus 12 as referring to the crucifixion of Jesus. In the Roman province of Asia, second-century Christians known as Quartodecimans continued to celebrate this feast in coincidence with the Jewish feast, but by then Christians elsewhere celebrated it on the following Sunday, the day on which in every week the resurrection of Christ was celebrated.

Latin adopted the Greek term for the feast, and in most European languages, notable exceptions being English, German and the Slavic languages, the feast is today called Pascha or words derived from it. However, in Polish the basic term is Wielkanoc (literally a compound word 'Greatnight'), while Pascha is unusual form. The very day is also called Wielka Niedziela, i.e. 'the Great Sunday'.

In Old English the form Pascan was used by Byrhtferth (c. 970 – c. 1020) and the form Pasches in the Anglo-Saxon Chronicle entry for 1122. Although now limited to specialized uses, the terms the Pasch or Pascha are sometimes used in Modern English. Pace, a dialect form of Pasch, is found in Scottish English and in the dialect of northeastern England, and used especially in combination with the word "egg", as in "Pace Egg play.

In nearly all Romance languages, the name of the Easter festival is derived from the Latin Pascha. In Spanish, Easter is Pascua, in Italian and Catalan Pasqua, in Portuguese Páscoa and in Romanian Paşti. In French, the name of Easter is Pâques and also derives from the Latin word but the s following the a has been lost and the two letters have been transformed into an â with a circumflex accent by elision. In Romanian, the only Romance language of an Eastern church, the word Înviere (resurrection, cf. Greek Ἀνάστασις, [anástasis]) is also used.

Albanian, although not a Romance language, borrows the Latin Pascha as Pashka. The holiday is frequently referred to in the plural, Pashkët. Similarly, Filipino adopted the Spanish term into Pasko (i.e., Pasko ng Pagkabuhay, "Pascha of the Resurrection"). The term, however, is more often used for Christmas.

In all modern Celtic languages the term for Easter is derived from Latin. In the Brittonic languages this has yielded Welsh Pasg, Cornish and Breton Pask. In Goidelic languages the word was borrowed before these languages had re-developed the /p/ sound and as a result the initial /p/ was replaced with /k/. This yielded Irish Cáisc, Gaelic Càisg and Manx Caisht. These terms are normally used with the definite article in Goidelic languages, causing lenition in all cases: An Cháisc, A' Chàisg and Yn Chaisht.

In Dutch, Easter is known as Pasen and in the North Germanic languages Easter is known as påske (Danish and Norwegian), påsk (Swedish), páskar (Icelandic) and páskir (Faroese). The name is derived directly from Hebrew Pesach. The letter å is pronounced /oː/, derived from an older aa, and an alternate spelling is paaske or paask.

In Russia, Pascha (Paskha/Пасха), is a borrowing of the Greek form via Old Church Slavonic.

In Ge'ez and most Ethiopian-Eritrean languages like but not limited to Amharic and Tigrinya, Easter is known as Fasika (ፋሲካ), etymologically descended from the Greek name Pascha (Πάσχα) with the /p/ sound evolving into an /f/ sound, and /s/ turning into /si/. Another word for Fasika that is used more as a description of the holiday than an actual name is Tensae (Ge'ez: ትንሣኤ) which means "to rise". While Fasika (ፋሲካ) is a more widespread and traditional term for Easter.

== Other etymologies ==
Some Slavic languages call it the Great Night, such as the Czech Velikonoce, Slovak Veľká noc and Slovenian Velika noč, following the tradition of the Church of Aquileia. In Bulgarian, Macedonian, Belarusian, and Ukrainian it's called "Great Day", respectively Bulgarian Великден (Velikden), Macedonian Велигден (Veligden), Belarusian Вялікдзень (Vialikdzien`), and Ukrainian Великдень (Velykden`). In Croatian it is called Uskrs and in Serbian Uskrs/Vaskrs, both meaning "resurrection".

Some non-Indo-European languages have unique etymologies for Easter.

In Hungarian, Easter is húsvét— literally, "taking the meat," a reference to traditional customs of abstaining entirely from eating meat during Lent.

In Finnish language Easter is Pääsiäinen which implies 'release' or 'liberation'. The word was created by Finnish bishop and bible translator Mikael Agricola.
