= Tej =

Ethiopian honey wine

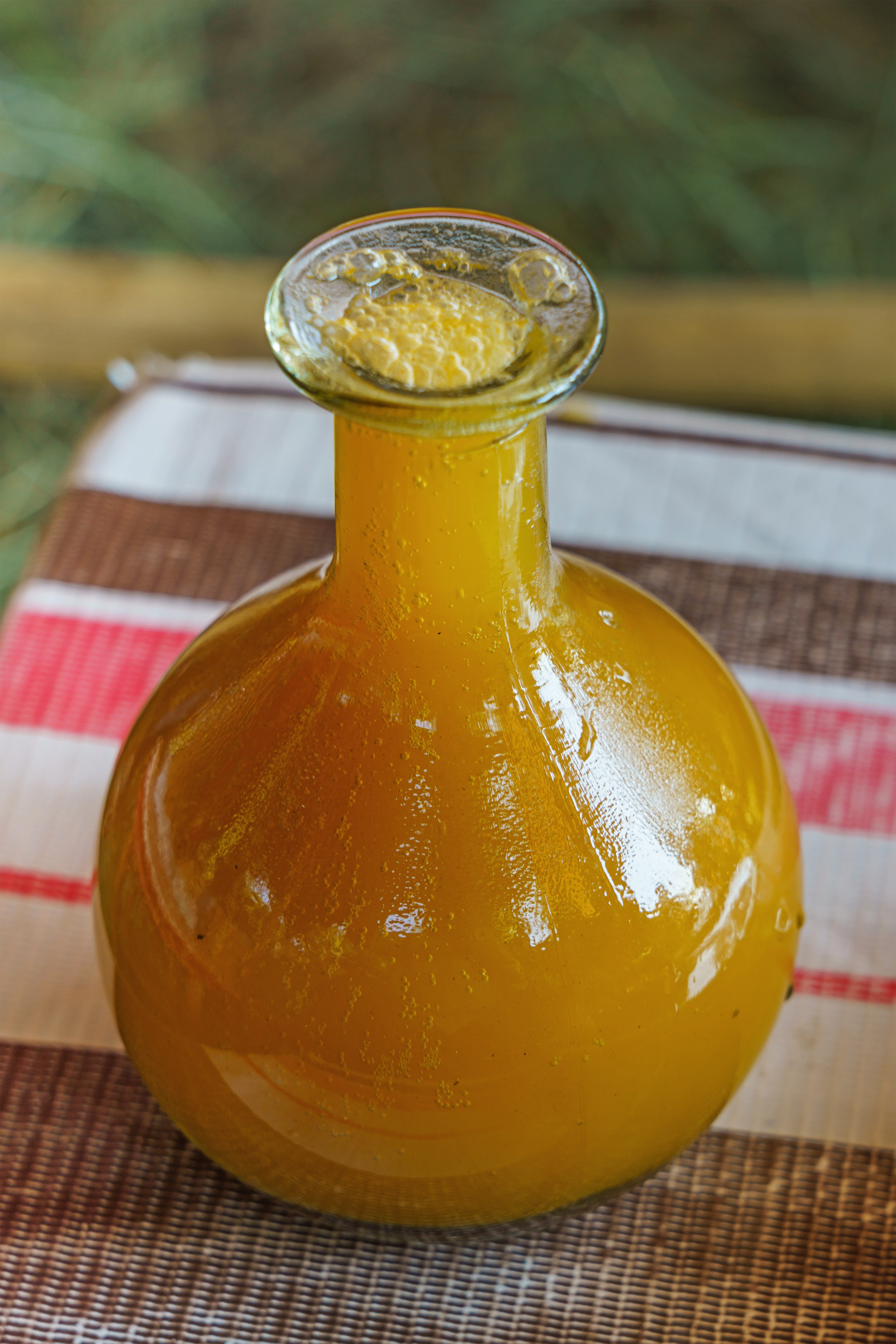
- A berele glass containing unfiltered myes
- Type: Mead
- Origin: Ethiopia
- Colour: Yellow
- Ingredients: Honey, water, gesho

Tej (from Amharic: ጠጅ, romanized: t'äǧ, pronounced [ˈtʼədʒ]; Tigrinya: ሜስ, romanized: més; Oromo: Daadhi) is a honey wine, like mead, that is brewed and consumed in Ethiopia and Eritrea. It has an alcohol content generally ranging from 7 to 11%. It is often home processed and consists of three main ingredients; honey, water and a medicinal shrub called "gesho" (Rhamnus prinoides). Tej is also available commercially to buy in many different types. It is generally consumed during social events such as festivals or weddings, and religious events like Ethiopian New Year (Enkutatash). Consequently, tej forms an important part of Ethiopian society and culture and is considered the national drink of Ethiopia.

In Ethiopia, tej is often homemade or served at tej houses, and is often served in a flask-like pitcher or bottle, called a berele. A different beverage, berz, is Ethiopian honey water.

== History ==
Tej has an extensive history in Ethiopian society and is thought to be one of the oldest alcoholic beverages ever produced. Although tej is largely consumed in Ethiopia, it is not restricted to Ethiopia. Fermented honey drinks are thought to be some of the oldest alcoholic beverages in existence. Tej has been consumed for generations in other countries including Eritrea and other variations of fermented honey beverages have been made throughout the continent, for example other honey meads such as Tanzanian wanzuki and Kenyan Muratina.

It is not known to researchers exactly when honey, water and gesho were first mixed together to create tej. However, excavations at Beta Samati, ancient Aksumite site, have found evidence of the consumption of wine, suggesting the existence of tej for many centuries. By the 16th century it was being used to honor warriors, as when Emperor Sarsa Dengel let the hero Aqba Mikael drink tej in his presence.

Prior to the 1900s, tej was only consumed by the King and others in his presence. It was also only produced in the houses of ruling classes. Honey, the key ingredient in the production of tej, was received as a tax and land rent from the other working classes during that time period. It is now made and available to the broader Ethiopian population and has become the national drink of Ethiopia.

=== Western experience with tej ===
One of the first western written accounts of Ethiopia was created by Father Francisco Álvares, a Portuguese priest that lived in Ethiopia with his mission for six years in the 1500s. He wrote of his experience with Ethiopian wine, specifically mentioning that 'wine of honey' was the best of all. He also recounted a celebration he attended which involved the consumption of tej. He detailed the fact that they were encouraged to continuously drink copious amounts of the honey wine during the celebration.

Another Portuguese missionary, Jeronimo Lobo, had experience with tej in Ethiopia in the 1600s. He wrote that the Ethiopian people commonly drank beer and mead, and people generally drank in excess when gathered together. He also mentioned that it was considered poor manners to allow guests to go without a drink and that the tej was always served by a servant.

Hormuzd Rassam, an Iraqi-Assyrian Assyriologist, wrote of his own experiences with tej in his book published in 1869. After a meeting with the Ethiopian emperor at the time, Emperor Theodorus, he was offered a large bottle of old and clear tej. He was requested to drink it despite his aversion towards it, previously describing tej as so sour it was undrinkable. He tried some and stated he enjoyed it more so than any other alcoholic beverage he had tried previously in Ethiopia.

== Production ==
Tej is a type of wine that is cloudy, and yellowish in colour, sweet and effervescent. The specific flavour of the wine largely depends on where bees are sourcing nectar for their honey production. Geographical location, vegetation, and especially climate are important in determining the taste of the wine. Whilst the exact steps of tej making may differ between different people, it is most frequently made from a mixture of one part honey to five parts water. However, a less expensive version of tej can be made by replacing some of the honey with sugar. In this case, the yellow colour is then created by adding a natural yellow food colouring. The mixture of honey and water is then stirred in a Genbo or Etro (a traditional narrow mouthed vessel), until the honey completely dissolves. The stems and leaves of Rhamnus prinoides are then chopped and boiled in either water or a small portion of the grand mixture. This is done for roughly 45 minutes and once finished it is added to the grand mixture. The vessel containing the mixture is then sealed airtight at the mouth using a cotton cloth. It is then left to ferment for a period of time that can generally range from a few days to months; however, the mixture needs to be stirred daily. After the mixture has fermented for the desired period of time, it needs to be filtered through a cloth before consumption in order to remove the Rhamnus prinoides and any sediment.

Other ingredients and modifications in the steps of production can be introduced to create different variations of tej with different flavours. These can include smoking the fermentation pot in order to achieve a smoky flavour, adding various spices such as ginger or tamarind, other plants such as khat (Catha edulis), and using crude honey as opposed to refined due to the belief it creates a better mead. Early productions of tej also included roasted barley in order to provoke the fermentation process. These early makings of tej would usually only ferment for 5 to 6 days and were meant to be drunk after, not with, the meal. The bark or wood of another related plant, the shrub Rhamnus staddo (sado wood), is also sometimes added to tej. Tej makers generally add a variety of these different roots of plants, barks or herbal ingredients to their brew in order to improve the overall flavour and potency of the tej. As a result of this, producers of tej often do not disclose the exact ingredients added to their specific concoction.

=== Fermentation ===
Generally during the fermentation process, tej is left for a week or longer in warmer weather, and in cooler climates is generally left for 15 to 20 days. The fermentation of tej depends on the different micro-organisms that are present in the ingredients, specifically, their substrates. The lactic acid bacteria present during the making of tej are known to generate an array of chemical compounds during the fermentation process. The acidity, distinctive flavour and aroma of tej are created by the metabolic products of these bacteria. The microorganisms present on the equipment and fermentation vats also cause variations in the tej.

== Sociocultural significance ==
Tej is most often produced through homebrewing and is therefore very readily available to much of the Ethiopian population. As a result of this and the drink's long history, it is used during a number of different important religious and social events. Some of these special religious occasions include Christmas, New Year (Enkutatash), Epiphany (Timkat), Easter (Fasika), and the discovery of the True Cross (Meskel). The social events consist of occasions like inaugural ceremonies, weddings and festivals. Its frequent use during these occasions and extensive history make tej Ethiopia's national drink.

Ethiopia produces the largest amount of honey in Africa, creating approximately 45,300 tonnes (49,900 short tons) annually. The second largest producer is Tanzania, which produces approximately 8,000 tonnes (8,800 short tons) annually. The amount of honey produced showcases its and tej's importance in Ethiopian society. From the total honey produced in Ethiopia, around 80% is used in the production of tej. Therefore, tej also plays an important role in daily life, with honey and honey wines being used for bartering. Tej is commonly consumed in and produced by tej houses, called tejbet. These are located across Ethiopia in villages, towns and cities. Tej is also commercially produced by breweries both within Ethiopia and globally. Subsequently, there are a number of different brands of tej available for purchase, each of which have different flavours and alcohol content.

== Health effects ==
Traditional alcoholic beverages such as tej can be vital sources of calories as well as a source of vitamin B. The presence of vitamin B in tej is a result of the fermenting yeasts, substrate residue and other different microorganisms. Two of the ingredients used in the making of tej, honey and Rhamnus prinoides, also have medicinal importance. Another ingredient occasionally used in tej, Rhamnus staddo, is being examined as a possible antimalarial candidate.

As an alcoholic beverage and ergo a depressant, tej also has potential negative impacts. These impacts are usually associated with risk of dependency and the related potential health risks. Tej has been linked to alcoholism in Ethiopia as a result of two main factors. One such factor is its strong presence and sociocultural significance, which causes it to appear in multiple celebrations throughout the year. The other is because of its nature as a largely home-brewed drink, which makes it easier to attain and afford for most people. Studies have also suggested that tej poses health threats due to its high alcoholic strength. High methanol concentration in tej was another factor identified as a potential hazard to human health.

== Chemistry ==
Tej takes on its yellow, cloudy and effervescent nature due to the contents of the yeasts present in it. These yeasts largely come from the Saccharomyces genus; which are commonly the catalysts of the reaction when converting sugars into ethanol. Yeasts in particular are some of the most dominant microorganisms present in tej. Research into these yeasts determined that over 25% of the yeasts that ferment tej are from the species Saccharomyces cerevisiae. Other yeasts, such as Kluyveromyces bulgaricus which made up 16% of the total, also contribute to the fermentation process. The yeasts specifically belonging to the Kluyveromyces and Saccharomyces species have also been reported to be important in the fermentation of various other wines.

Tej has been studied due to its various chemical and nutritional properties as well as its unique fermentation process. A study by Bahiru, Mehari & Ashenafi (2001) found that each tej has physico-chemical variations. This is a result of the different stages that the randomized microflora, present in the ingredients of tej, are in. The amount and type of the specific yeast species present in each tej also creates differentiations, as it results in differing chemical compositions that would create variations even if the tej came from the same source. It is also due to the spontaneous nature of fermentation which makes each tej unique.

The honey which was used to create tej in the past, and still today, was generally collected from wild nests or produced in 'traditional barrel-type hives'. As a result of this gathering method, the honey also contained wax, pollen, bees and broken combs. These additions; however, served a purpose in the production of tej. The remaining wax floating on the surface of the mixture can make the fermentation process more anaerobic (less oxygenated) and the pollen functions as a yeast nutrient.

The use of honey in the production of tej also results in a significant level of sugar content. Sugars constitute about 80% of honey and dependent on the ratio of honey to water used to create the specific tej, the overall diluted sugar content of the honey generally ranges from 13 to 27%. Alcohol content can also vary greatly between different types of tej. The typical range is 7 to 11% or 7 to 14%. Research has been conducted on tej with alcohol content levels as low as 2.7% and as high as 21.7%.

The pH of tej was found to range from 3.02 to 4.90, meaning it is acidic. This was further confirmed by the titratable acidity levels. These levels, again, could vary as a result of the spontaneous nature of fermentation. However, the mean pH level identified by Bahiru, Mehari & Ashenafi (2001) was significantly higher than other alcoholic beverages such as Korean honey wine, Nigerian oil-palm wine and African mango juice wine.

== See also ==
- Eritrean cuisine
- List of Ethiopian dishes and foods
- Tella, an Ethiopian beer
- Siwa (beer)
