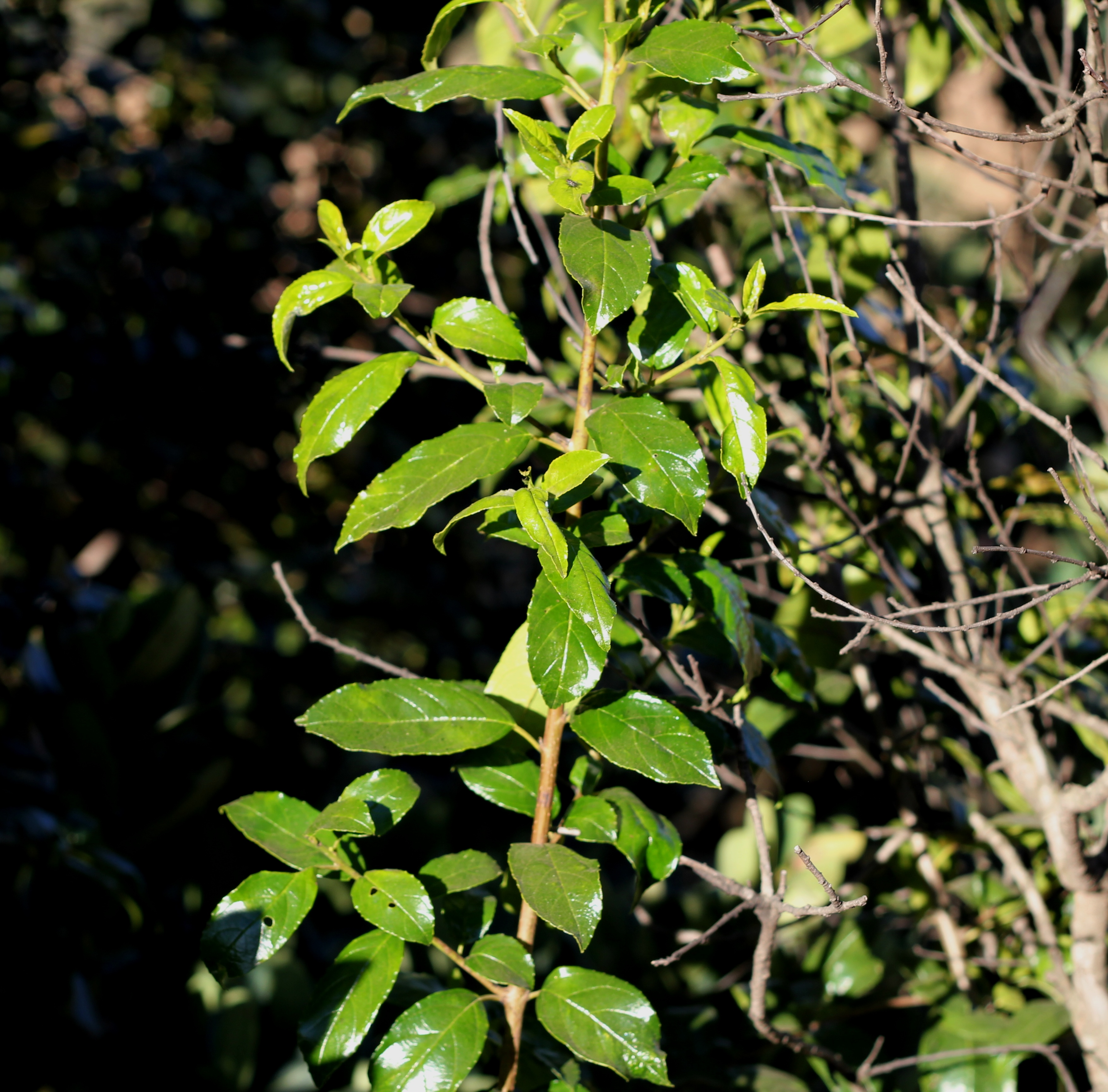
- Habit of Rhamnus prinoides

Conservation status
- Least Concern (IUCN 3.1)

Scientific classification
- Kingdom: Plantae
- Clade: Tracheophytes
- Clade: Angiosperms
- Clade: Eudicots
- Clade: Rosids
- Order: Rosales
- Family: Rhamnaceae
- Genus: Rhamnus
- Species: R. prinoides

Binomial name
- Rhamnus prinoides L'Hér.

Synonyms
- Alaternus prinoides (L'Hér.) Raf.; Celtis rhamnifolia C.Presl, nom. illeg.; Rhamnus celtifolia Thunb.; Rhamnus pauciflora Salisb., nom. illeg. superfl.; Rhamnus pauciflora Hochst. ex A.Rich.; Rhamnus prinoides var. acuminata Kuntze; Rhamnus prinoides var. obtusifolia Kuntze; Ziziphus lucida Moench

= Gesho =

Species of tree

Rhamnus prinoides, the shiny-leaf buckthorn, is an African shrub or small tree in the family Rhamnaceae. Commonly referred to as gesho, it was first scientifically described by French botanist Charles Louis L'Héritier de Brutelle in 1789.

== Description ==
Rhamnus prinoides occurs from Ethiopia, Eritrea and South Sudan through eastern and southern Africa to South Africa, with outlier populations in Cameroon and Yemen, at medium to high elevations. They grow near streams or along forest margins. The small edible fruits are shiny red and berry-like.

== Uses ==
The Rhamnus prinoides plant has many uses amongst the inhabitants of Africa. All parts of the plant are harvested and used for nutrition, medicine or religious purposes.

In Ethiopia and Eritrea, where the plant is known as gesho or gešo, it is used in a manner similar to hops. The stems are boiled and the extract mixed with honey to ferment a mead called tej in Amharic and myes in Tigrinya.

It is also used in the brewing of tella (siwa in Tigrinya), an Ethiopian and Eritrean beer. This local drink is made from gesho as a major ingredient. Gesho leaves are sundried and pounded with mortar and pestle into flour. Barley malt is prepared and sundried and ground. These two ingredients are mixed, in a proportion that varies from maker to maker, and fermented 3 to 5 days on average. Finger millet (or sorghum and maize flour regionally) are baked, and finally mixed with the fermented solution. After 1–2 days of fermentation, the tella can be filtered and consumed in a drink locally called guesh (tsiray in Tigrinya). In Central Kenya the plant is known as "Mûkarakinga" and it is believed to be medicinal. The bark of the plant is cut, boiled and then added to soup.

== Gallery ==
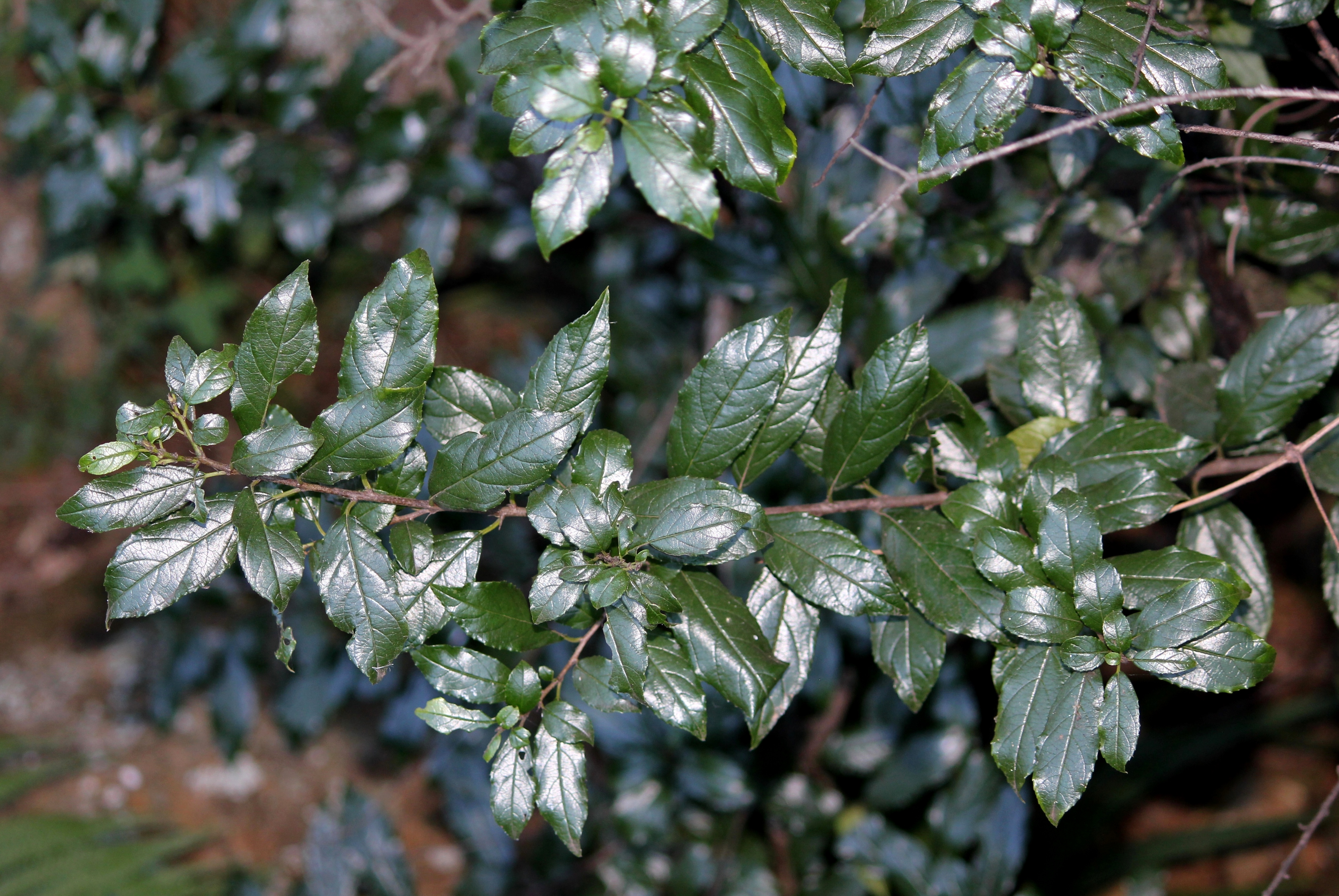
Foliage

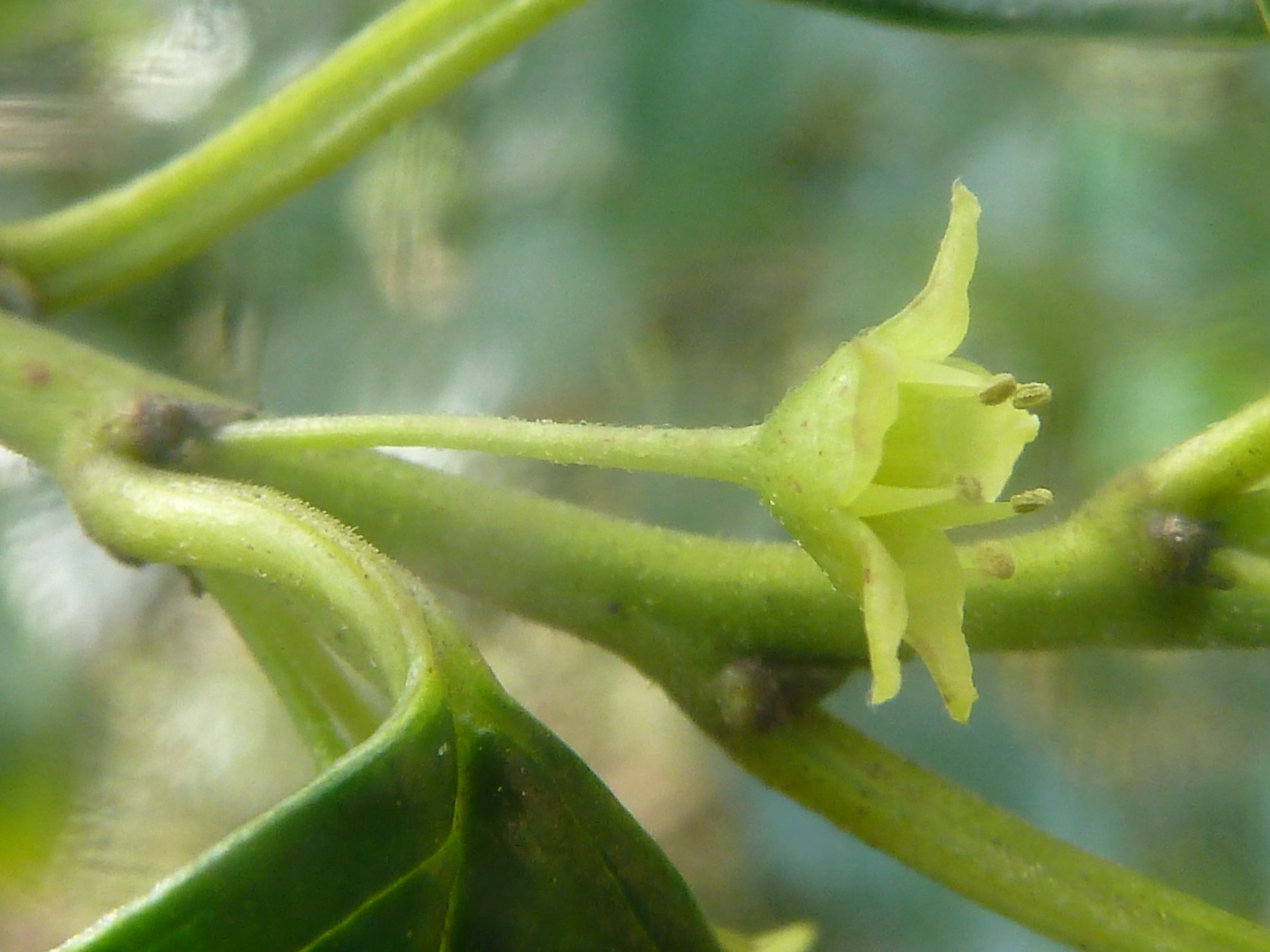
Flower

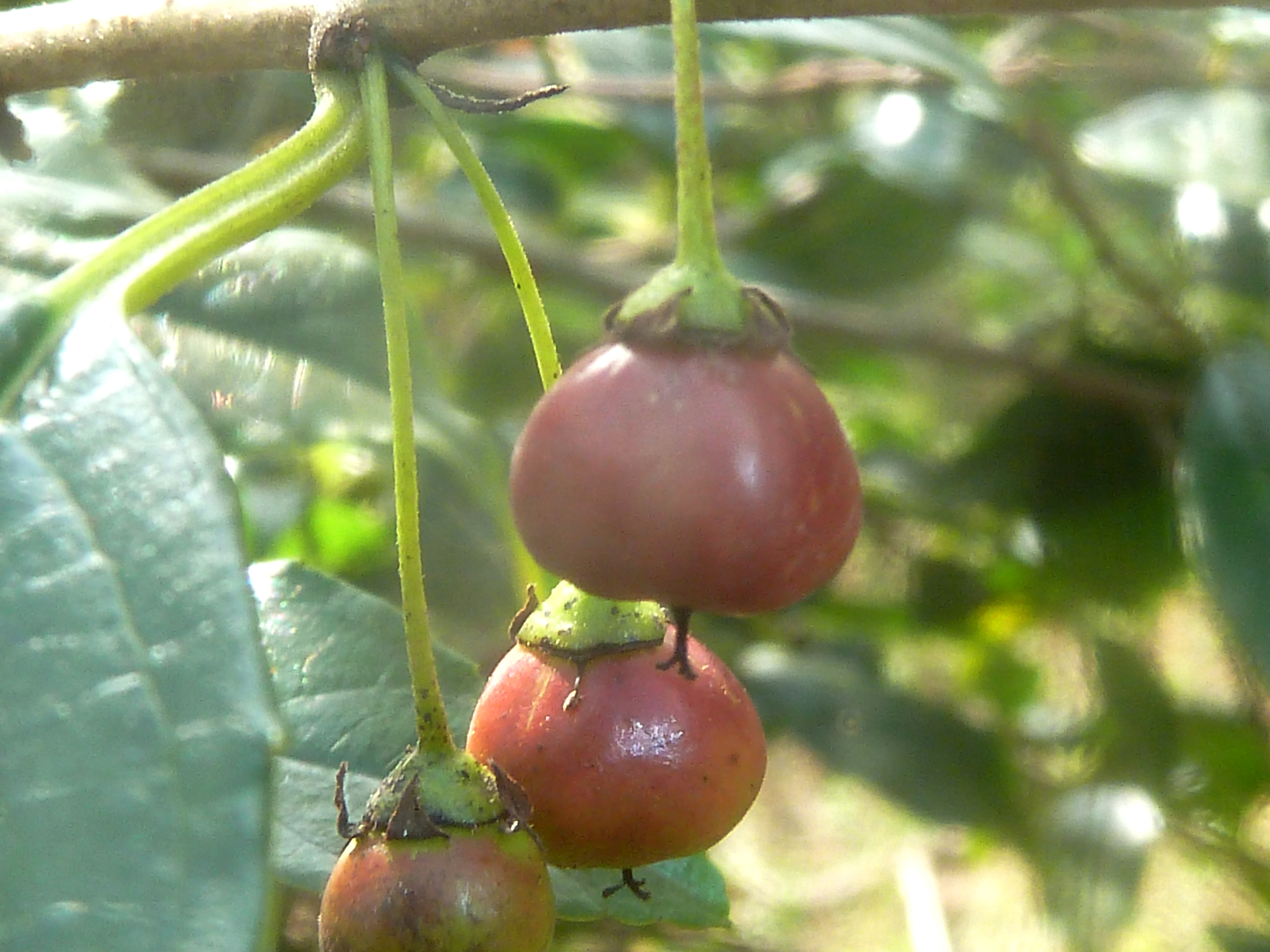
Unripe fruit

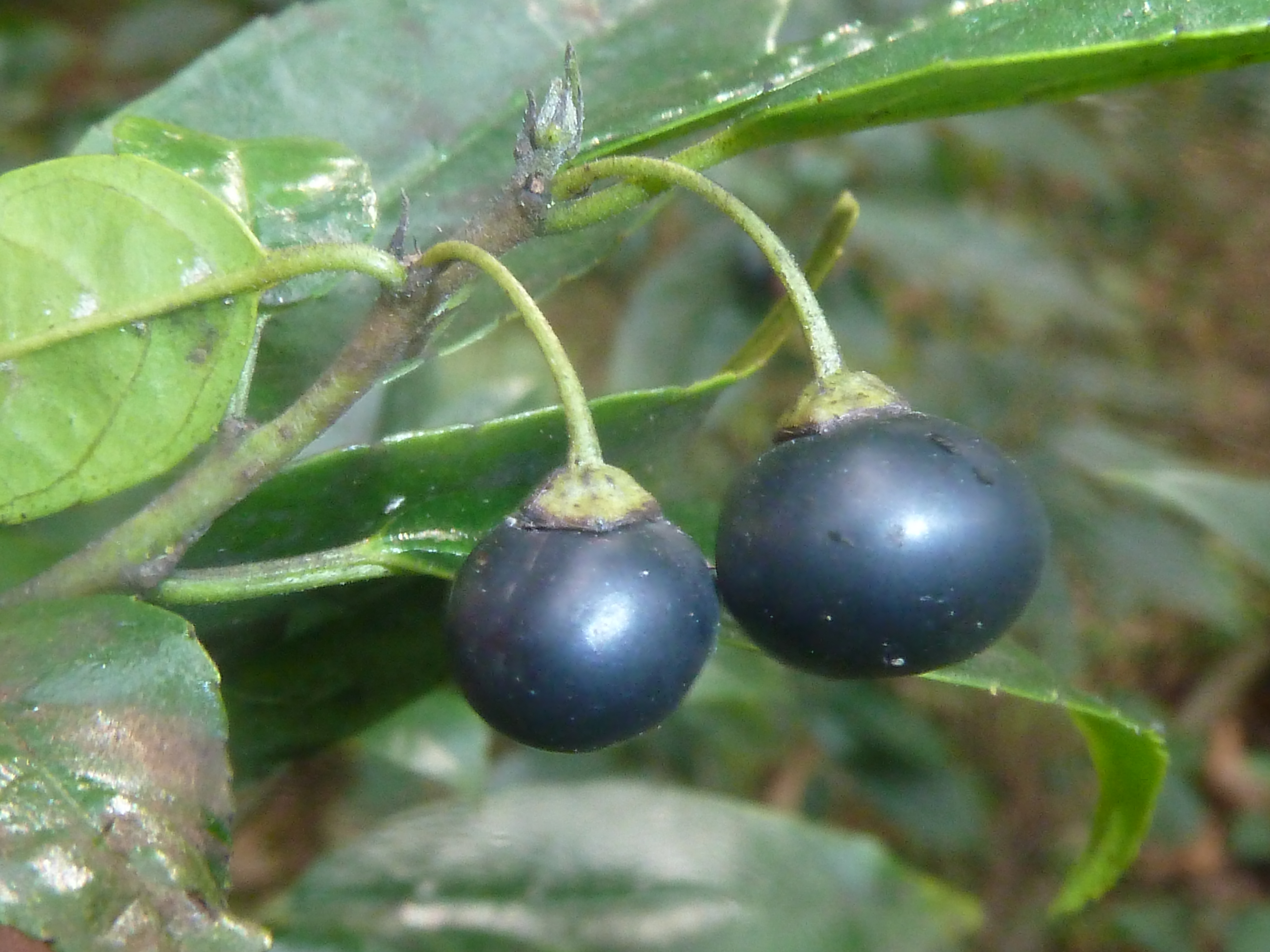
Ripe fruit
