= Tella =

Ethiopian-Eritrean traditional beer

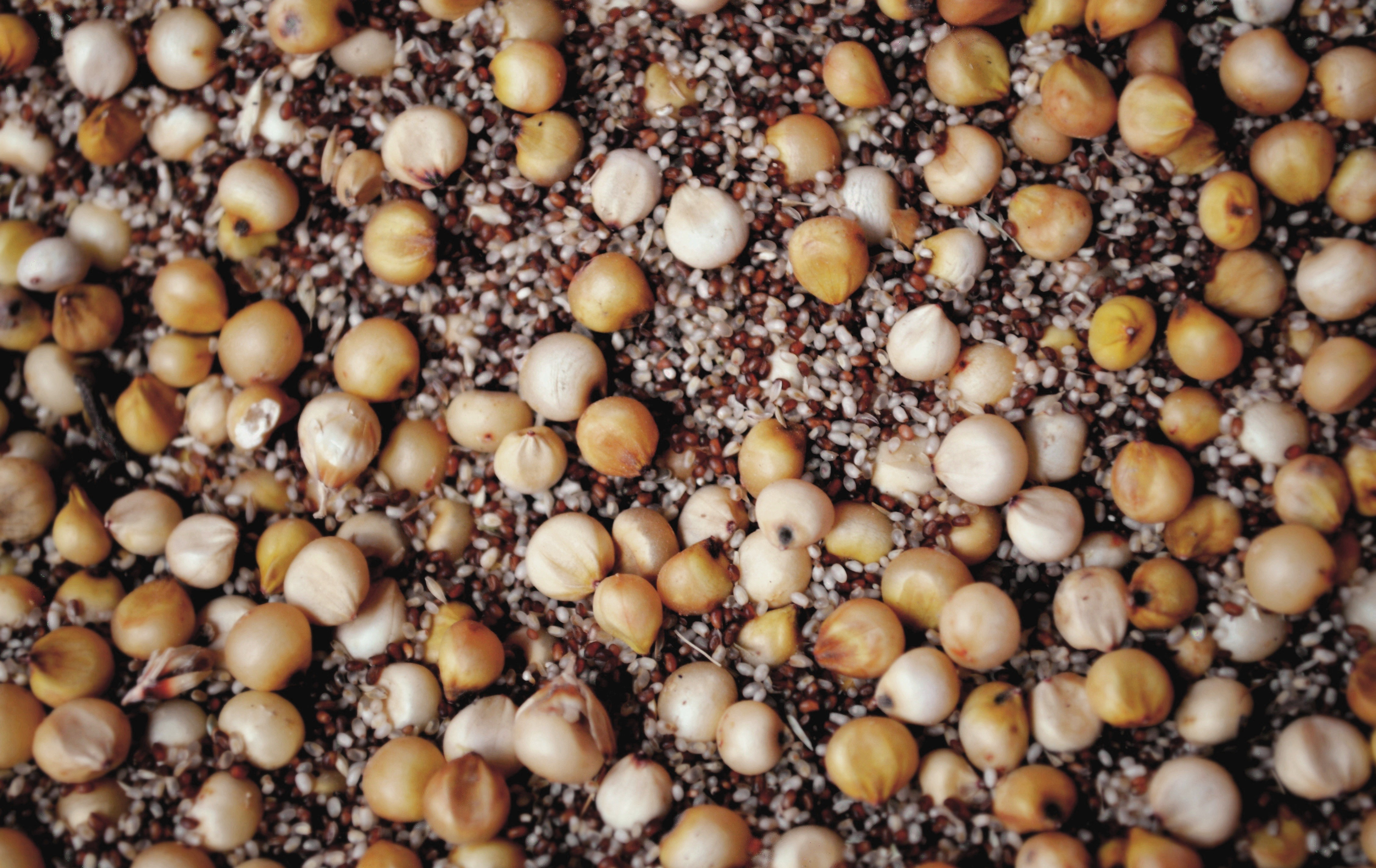
Teff and sorghum, Tella grains

Tella or talla (Amharic ጠላ) is a traditional beer from the Amhara Region of Ethiopia. It is brewed from various grains, which can change depending on location. These typically include barley or teff. Depending on region, wheat, sorghum, or corn may be used; spices can also be added. Dried and ground shiny-leaf buckthorn leaves are used for fermentation. The drink is made in a clay pot. The pot is washed with a plant called grawa. After rinsing it is smoked with weyra or Abyssinian rose. The alcohol content of tella is usually around 2–4 volume percent. Its history as an indigenous traditional beverage has roots tracing back centuries to the Aksumite Empire in northern Ethiopia.

Tella is often home-brewed. It may be offered in tella houses (tellabet) or served in the home. In urban areas, the drink is used on special occasions like holidays or weddings.

Tella was commonly used for kiddush by the Beta Israel (Ethiopian Jews). Tella was used because wine was often unavailable. Due to the availability of wine in Israel, Ethiopian-Israelis generally use wine for kiddush instead of tella.

== See also ==
- Siwa
- Tej, an Ethiopian and Eritrean honey wine
- List of Ethiopian dishes and foods
- Eritrean cuisine
