= Masar =

Masar may refer to:

== People ==
- Masar (surname)
- Masar Caka (1946–2000), Albanian painter
- Masar Ömer (born 1993), Finnish footballer

== Other ==
- Masar Destination, an urban development project in Mecca, Saudi Arabia
- Masar (horse), an Irish-bred racehorse
- Maşar Dasht, a village in Iran
- Masar Ghan, a village in Iran
- Masar, a version of the Hejazi turban

== See also ==
- Masr (disambiguation)
- Massar (disambiguation)
