= Hejazi turban =

Headgear from the Hejaz region of Saudi Arabia

Hejazi turban العِمامة الحِجازيّة
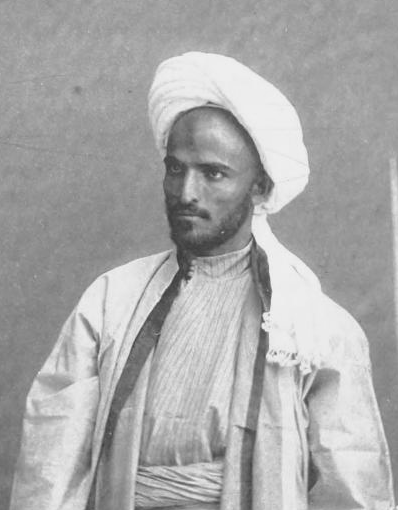
- Example of white Hejazi Turban.
- Type: Arab clothing
- Place of origin: Hejaz, Arabian Peninsula

The Hejazi turban (Arabic: العِمامة الحِجازيّة, ʾimāmah IPA: ʕi.maː.mah), also spelled Hijazi turban, is a type of the turban headdress native to the region of Hejaz in modern-day western Saudi Arabia.

It is but one version of Arabian turbans that have been worn in the Arabian Peninsula from the pre-Islamic era to the present day. Islamic Arabs of the Arabian Peninsula region such as the Quraysh, Ansar, Qahtanites, Kindites, Nabataeans, Qedarites, Adnanites, Himyarites, Lakhmids, Ghassanids, and others used to wear the turban alongside the Keffiyeh which is also popular today in the rest of the Arabian Peninsula.

By the Islamic era, the Hejazi turban became less common in the region and was replaced by the imama. Centuries after that, the imama was replaced by the Ghutrah / Shemagh.

== Versions ==
The Arabian Hejazi turban is still worn today by some Ulama and Imams.

Worn in coloured or white varieties, the turban was a common inherited cultural headwear in the region of Hijaz. The Imamah was the traditional headwear for many in the region, from traders to the religious scholars, and the colours in which it was worn differed between individuals.

In particular, the coloured turban is known as a Ghabanah and was a common head accessory for the inhabitants of Mecca, Madinah and Jeddah in particular. Ghabanah today is the heritage uniform headwear for local traders and the general categories of the prestigious and middle-class. There are several types of Ghabanah, perhaps the most famous is the yellow (Halabi), that is made in Aleppo and is characterized by different inscriptions and is wrapped on a dome-like hollow taqiyah or a Turkish fez or kalpak cap. It is similar to turbans in neighbouring regions, like the masar, a traditional lightly-coloured turban in Oman that is also common in some regions like the south of Yemen and Hadhramaut.

Additionally, sometimes keffiyeh is wrapped around the head in a style resembling a turban.

== Suppression ==
With the Hijaz in particular falling under Saudi control, there have been attempts to suppress local ethnic dress and enforce cultural homogeneity with wider Saudi society. With the introduction of a law in 1964, there was a temporary ban on wearing the traditional turban - local urban Hijazis could no longer wear them and had to wear the Saudi national dress that included a Ghutrah or Shemagh instead.

== See also ==
- Islam and clothing
- Types of hijab
- Kufiyyah
- Agal (accessory)
- Thawb
- Izar
- Bisht
- Litham
- Sirwal
- Taqiyah
