= Bisht (clothing) =

Outer cloak

Bisht بِشْت
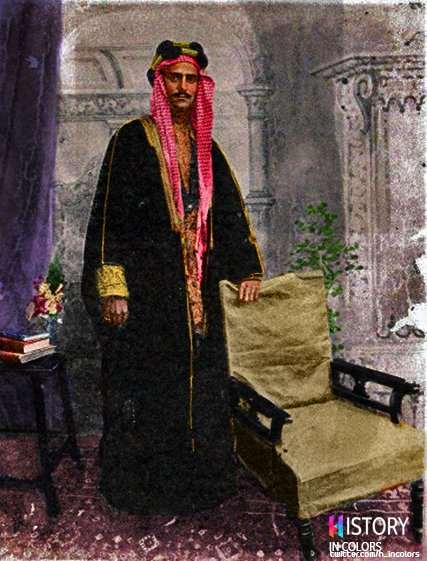
- Sheikh Chassib, son of Sheikh Khazʿal bin Jaber, Crown Prince of the Emirate of Mohammerah, wearing the adorned bisht affiliated with the clothing, in a picture of 1923.
- Type: Arab clothing
- Material: Camel hair and Goat wool and for the wealthy pure gold thread
- Place of origin: Arabian Peninsula
- Introduced: 2300 BCE

Bisht (men's Abaa): skills and practices
- UNESCO Intangible Cultural Heritage
- Country: Bahrain, Iraq, Jordan, Kuwait, Oman, Qatar, Saudi Arabia, Syria, and the United Arab Emirates
- Reference: 02233
- Region: Arab States

Inscription history
- Inscription: 2025 (20th session)
- List: Representative

A bisht (Arabic: بِشْت; plural: بِشُوت bishūt and بْشُوت bshūt), known in some Arabic spoken dialects as mishlaḥ (Arabic: مِشْلَح) or ʿabāʾ (Arabic: عَبَاء), is a traditional men's cloak popular in the Arab world, and worn in general for thousands of years.

The bisht is usually worn over the thawb for special occasions, including weddings, religious prayers, and national events. It is traditionally made out of Camel hair or wool. Historically it served as a functional garment that protects against the harsh weather conditions of the Desert, but today it serves as an important ceremonial piece of clothing that showcases heritage and status among Arab communities.

== Etymology ==
The triliteral root of the word bisht is widely used in Semitic languages, including Arabic, and is related to the Akkadian bishtu, meaning 'nobility' or 'dignity'.

The alternate name of ʿabāʾ (Arabic: عَبَاء) is from the Arabic triliteral root ʿAyn-Bāʾ-Wāw, which relates to 'filling out'.

== History ==
The bisht has been worn in the Arab world for centuries and was originally used as a practical garment made out of wool or camel hair, which made it suitable for the harsh desert weather. it used to be worn by both Bedouin and urban communities and has existed since before the Islamic era, during which it was often worn by leaders and soldiers.

Over time, the bisht became associated with status and importance, especially when worn by important figures during formal occasions. The use of materials such as gold thread embroidery called zari further strengthened its connection to prestige and social standing.

Today, the bisht is mainly worn during special occasions and ceremonial events, rather than everyday life, but still continues to represent culture and tradition.

== Usage ==
Bishts are typically worn at formal events like weddings, funerals, religious events like Eid prayers, and during government or national duties. Bishts are also frequently worn by people who hold positions of authority such as politicians and Islamic scholars, signifying prestige and respect. Wearing a bisht is also viewed as an honor, especially when attending significant events.

The way the bisht is worn also follows certain cultural practices. It is draped over the shoulders and often held on the left side, leaving the right hand free for greetings. It can also be worn in a more structured way during more formal settings to reflect formality and etiquette. The choice of bisht also changes depending on the occasion, the time of day, season, or level of formality.

== Types ==
Bishts differ depending on material, season, and level of formality. Some bishts are made from heavier materials such as camel hair or wool and are worn in winter, while lighter linen bishts are worn during warmer seasons.

There are also differences in quality and design. some bishts are made with finer materials and require more precise and time consuming production, while others are simpler, which makes summer bishts much more expensive.

Color also plays an important role in how the bisht is used. Common colors include black, brown, beige, cream or grey. In Gulf traditions, lighter colors are usually worn during the day, while darker colors are more common for the evening or formal events. Gold and silver embroidery known as 'Zari', is often used for more prestigious bishts.

== Manufacturing ==
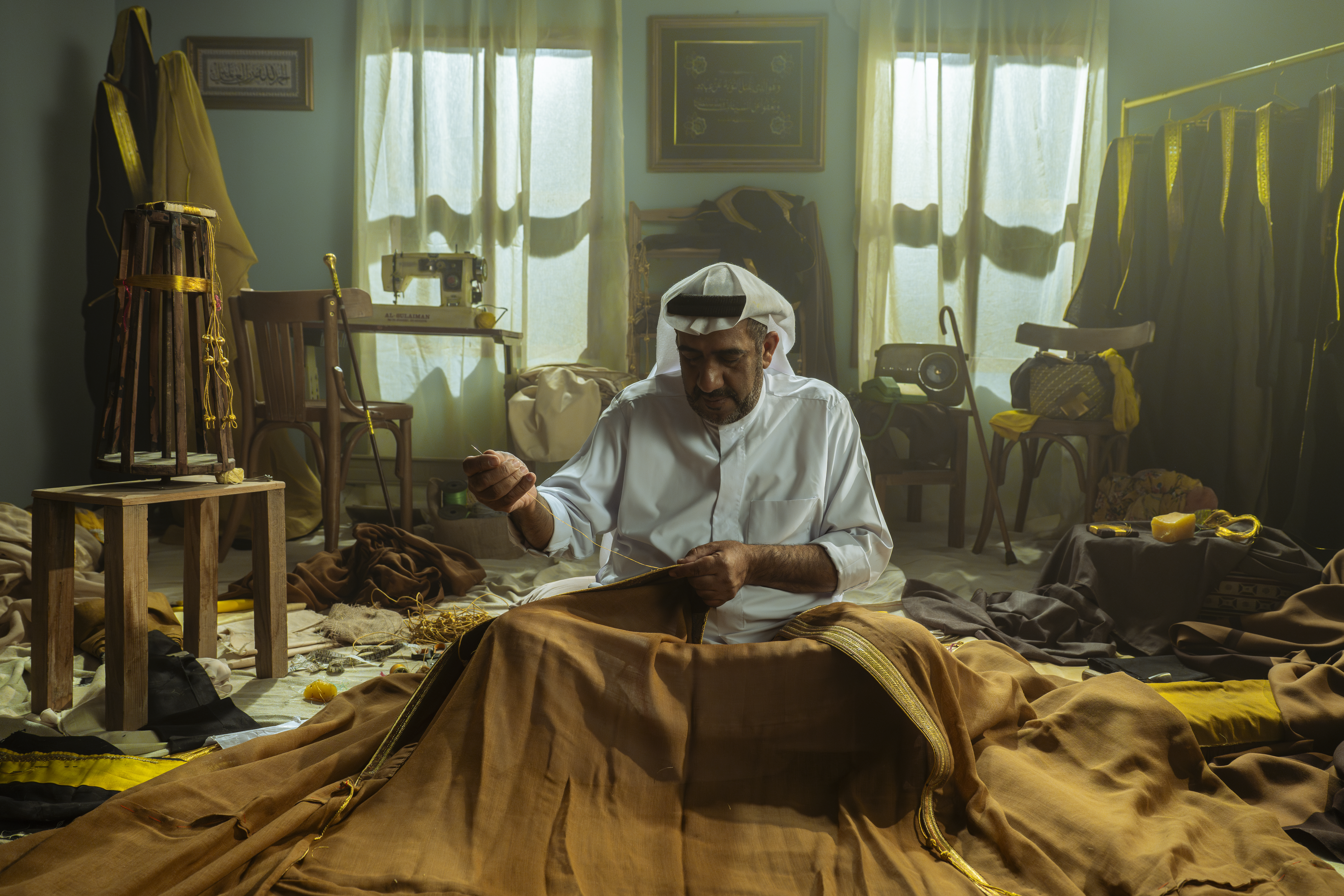
A Saudi man making the Hasawi bisht, also known as the Hasawi mishlah.

Bishts are traditionally made from natural materials such as goat wool and camel hair that is spun and woven into fabric. This process involves several stages and requires a high level of skill and precision.

First, the fibers are prepared and woven into cloth using vertical and horizontal threads. The fabric is then cut into the shape and are sewn together carefully to maintain the structure of the garment. After this, the edges of the bisht are decorated with gold or silver threads known as zari embroidery .

Because this process involves detailed and time consuming work, handmade bishts are usually more expensive than machine made ones. Skilled artisans may spend several days producing a single bisht, and production usually involves a weaver and multiple tailors working together. Certain regions, such as Al Ahsa in Saudi Arabia, are well known for producing high quality bishts using traditional techniques, where the craft has been passed down through generations and continues to play an important part in the region's culture.

== Global Recognition ==
In the 2022 FIFA World Cup final, Qatari Emir Tamim bin Hamad Al Thani placed a bisht on the Argentine captain Lionel Messi before the 35-year-old was handed the trophy. This moment brought global attention to the bisht and introduced it to people beyond the Arab world. What was known within the Arab region became visible on an international stage, showcasing the importance of the garment.

Following this event, interest in the bisht increased internationally, and reports from local manufacturers stated a rise in demand, especially among tourists and international customers who became interested in the bisht and its significance.

== See also ==
- Agal (accessory)
- Arab culture
- Boubou
- Emamah
- Izar
- Kanzu
- Kufiyyah
- Litham
- Poncho
- Thawb
