= Vasmaq =

Vasmaq or Vesmaq (Persian: وسمق) may refer to:

- Vasmaq, Hamadan
- Vasmaq, Tafresh, Markazi Province
- Vesmaq, Zarandieh, Markazi Province
