= Chenaqchi (disambiguation) =

Chenaqchi is a village in East Azerbaijan Province, Iran

Chenaqchi or Chanaqchi or Chonaqchi (Persian: چناقچي), also rendered as Chunaqcheh and Janaqchi, may also refer to:

- Chenaqchi-ye Olya, Markazi Province
- Chenaqchi-ye Sofla, Markazi Province
- Batıçanakçı, Bağlar, formerly known as Chanaqchi
