= Gamcha =

Traditional scarf originated in eastern Indian subcontinent

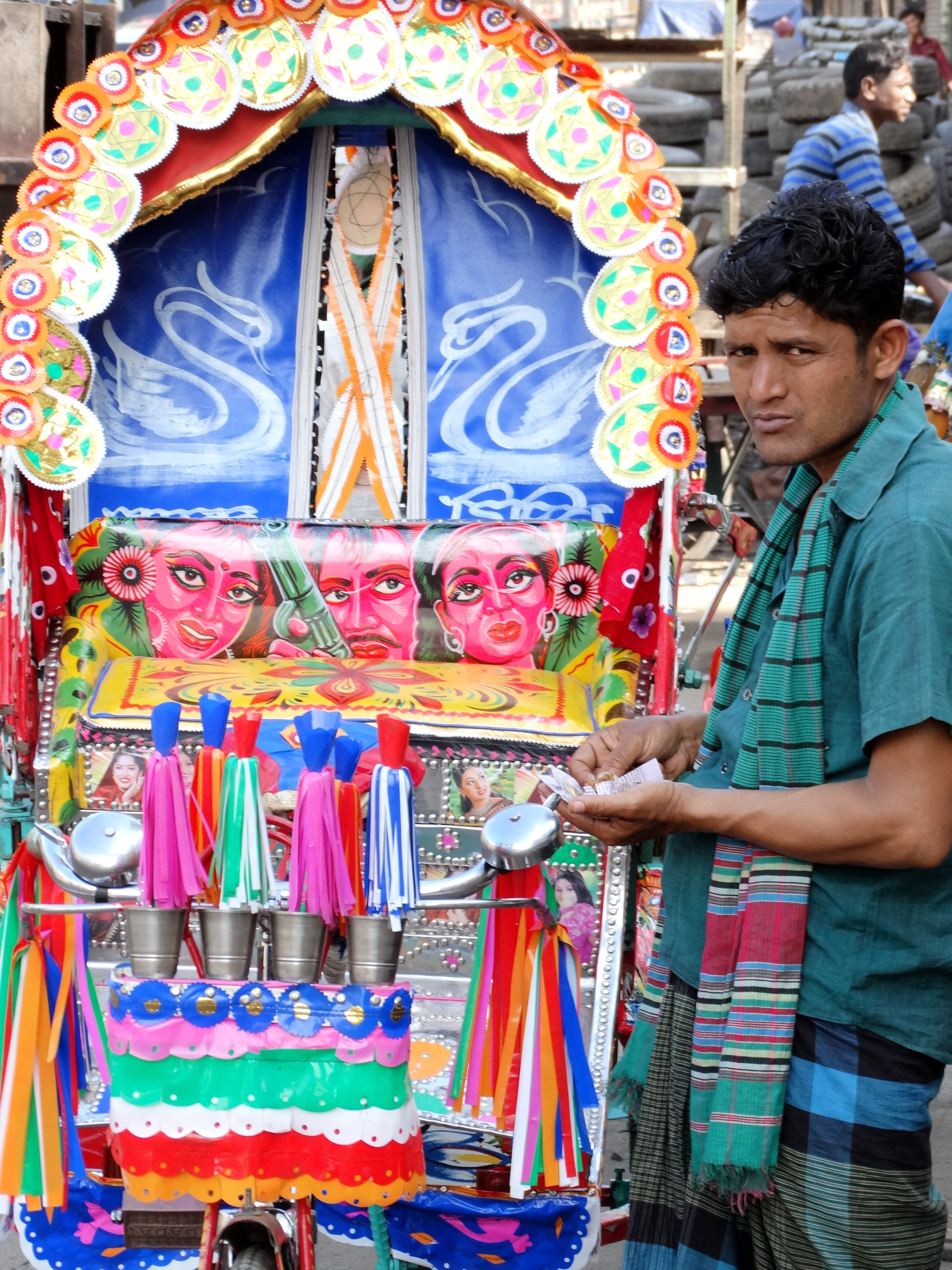
Bangladeshi Rickshaw Puller wearing traditional Gamcha

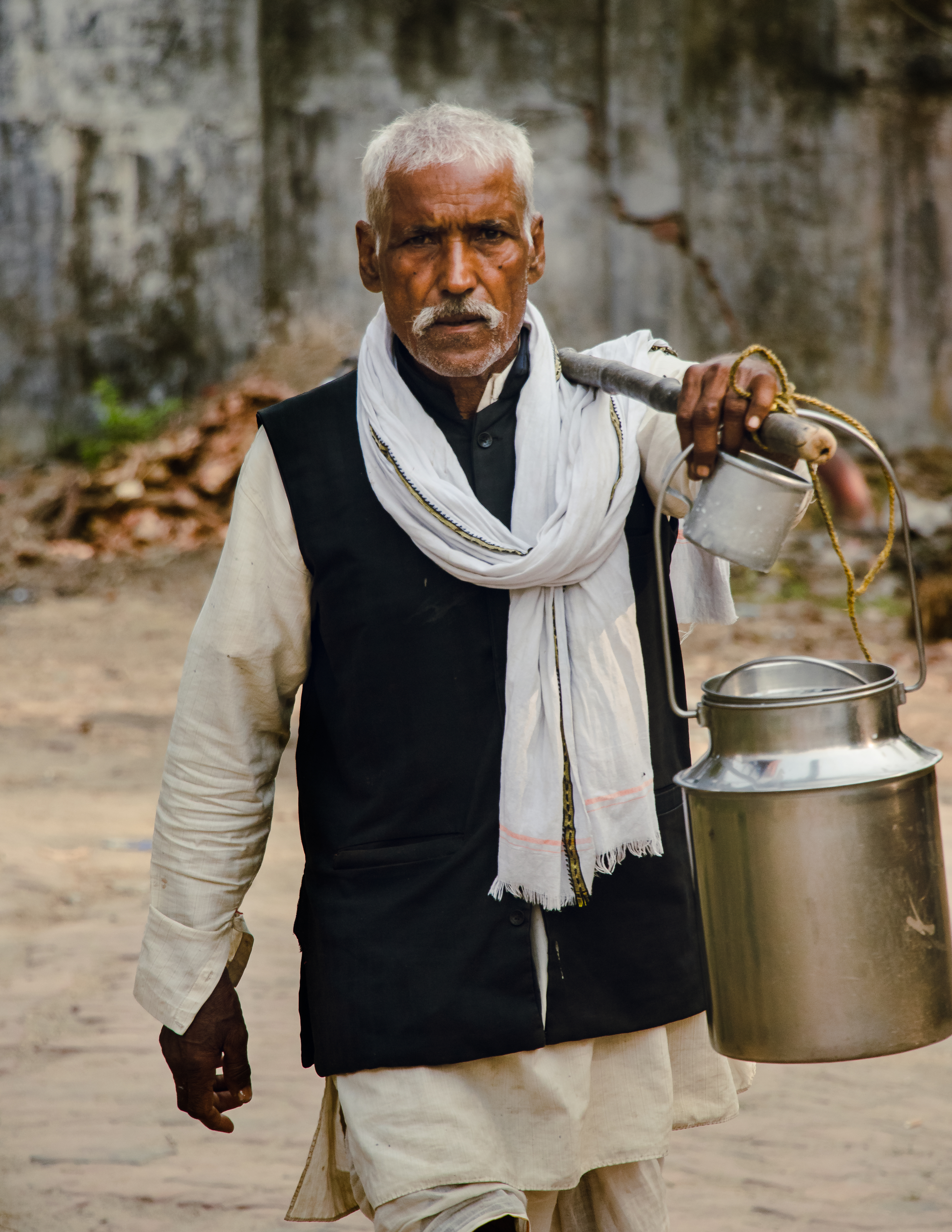
Milk salesman wearing Gamchha in Nepal

Gamcha (or Gamchhā (Bhojpuri), Gāmchhā, Gāmuchhā (Odia), Gamusā (Assamese) and Angochha) is a rectangular piece of traditional coarse cotton cloth, sometimes with a checked design, worn as traditional scarf by men in the Indian subcontinent, mainly in Eastern India (including Assam), Bangladesh, as well as in eastern Terai of Nepal. It also became bit popular in other cultures of India and now in what is known as Pakistan after the Indian partition, as well as various parts of South and Southeast Asia. The word "Gamcha" is Assamese word which comes from two very simple and commonly used Assamese words, (গা) ga which means "Body", and (মুছা) mucha which means "wipe". Literally translated, it means 'something to wipe the body with' however, interpreting the word gamcha as the towel is misleading. It is often worn on one side of the shoulder. Its appearance varies from region to region, and it has been traditionally worn as a scarf by the Odia men, Bhojpuriya men and Bengali men. Gamcha is also a headwear for Bengali men in West Bengal and Bangladesh. Gamucha was also mentioned in Odia Mahabharata by Sarala Dasa as part of the traditional dress of Odia men. Weavers of traditional tantubaya or jugi community migrated from Bangladesh to Tripura and weavers of Odisha produce good quality gamucha.

The gamcha is most commonly found with check and striped patterns of red, orange or green. Plain white gamchhas with coloured (embroidered or printed) borders from Odisha and Assam (for traditional Assamese Gamcha, see Gamosa) are local handicrafts, and may be worn around the neck with traditional Indian attire. In western areas, gamchas are primarily made in red colour and are plain like cloth. In southern India, gamucha is more coarse and are available in various dyes. Even homemade lightweight fur towels are also popularly termed as gamchhas. Gamucha are worn by the South Asian people, especially in the Indian states of Assam, Bihar, Odisha, West Bengal, Jharkhand and the Bhojpuri region, because they are better suited to the country's tropical, humid climate. They may also be found in hamams as a traditional male loincloth and towel worn during bathing and massage.

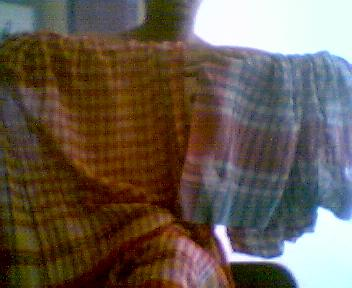
A pair of gamchhas with typical check patterns

== Other uses ==
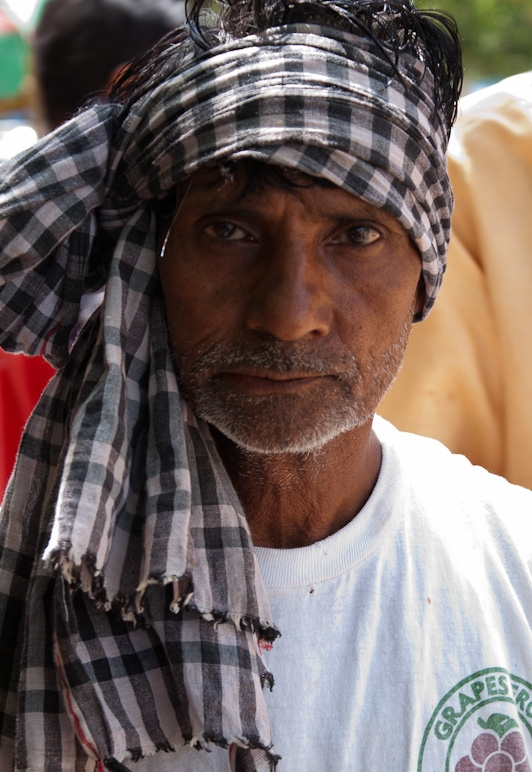
A fruit vendor wearing a gamchha tied as a headscarf.

=== Cultural symbol ===
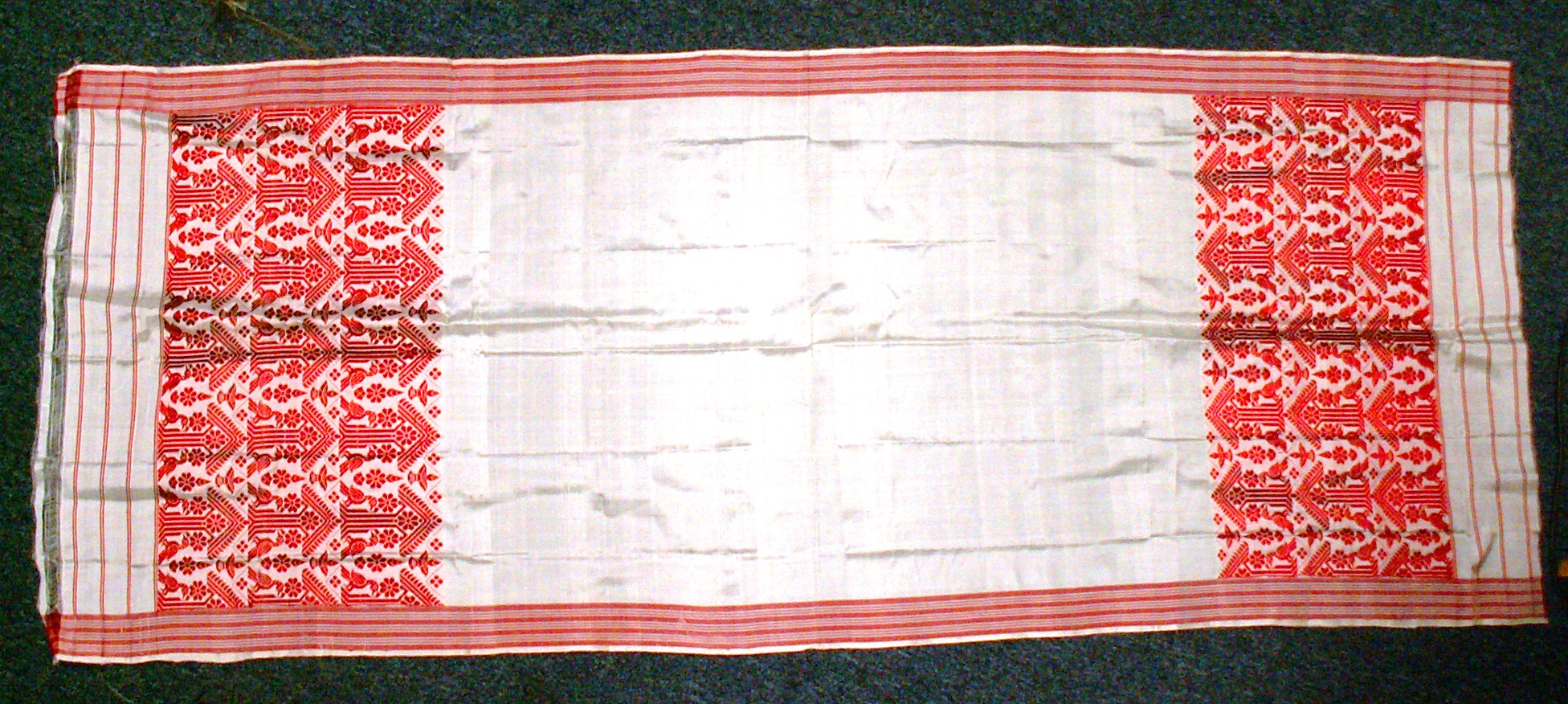
An Assamese Gamusa with embroidery designs.

Assamese gamosa or gamusa in Assam has a place of special use: it is given as a token of honour and respect to esteemed guest. In Bihu Dance male dancers wear it as a headscarf. The traditional Assamese dress is complete only when one wears a gamusa.

In the time of the Ahom kingdom, Ahom soldiers' wives used to weave a gamusa within a night and present it to her husband to ensure safety and victory.

=== Handkerchief or Towel ===
Gamcha is also used sometimes as a handkerchief or towel for personal use such as wiping the face.

==== Loincloth and headscarf ====
Gamcha is also worn as knee long loin cloths by people of the poorer sections of society, especially menial labourers and farm workers. They are also used as a headscarf, similar to the Middle Eastern keffiyeh in rural areas.

=== Safety ===
Gamchas can be turned into an effective weapon against wolves, leopards, wild dogs or feral dogs or even dacoits, by knotting a large stone pebble into one end and using it like bolas.

=== Face mask ===
Farmers were already using it in rural areas for various purposes, Gamcha became an alternative cloth face mask in rural India. The WHO guidelines for the necessary use of masks for protection from COVID increased its importance, and it became a choice of face masks by simply wearing on face. The need for this traditional piece of clothing has risen further since the Prime Minister of India made a television speech wearing Gamcha(a Manipuri gamcha, also known as Meitei Lengyan). It was trending since then in urban areas too.

== Commercial aspects ==
Gamcha is produced as a primary handloom product by traditional weavers. Presently the production of coarse handmade gamucha is slowing down in Odisha. A 1,455.3 metre long Gamucha displayed in Delhi created world record as it became world's longest hand woven piece of cloth.

== See also ==
- Agal (accessory), Arabian headdress
- Gingham, scarf from Malaysia
- Keffiyeh, traditional Middle Eastern headdress
- Krama, Cambodian scarf
- Tagelmust, scarf from Sahara
- Turban, head scarf
- Lungi
- Grameen check
