= Jawbi =

Iraqi music and dance genre

Jawbi, Al-Jawbi or Al-Jawbia, (Arabic: جوبي، الجوبي أو الجوبية), is an Iraqi Bedouin and village music and dance genre that is danced by a group in a circle.

== Description ==
It is called Dabke in the Levant, and is often performed at festivals and wedding celebrations. Jawbi group consists of a group of five to ten dancers, and these groups are called Ahl Al-Jawbi, (means: People of Jawbi). When singing this genre of music, they use Arghul, Shabbabeh and Drum. Al-Jawbi is a group oriental dance known in northern, central and southern Iraq and is very popular in western Iraq and in the provinces of Al-Anbar, Saladin, Nineveh and Iranian Arabs in Khuzestan. Jawbi dance costume consists of Thawb, Keffiyeh and Agal and their dance forms It consists of coordinated movements by the Jawbi dancers holding each other's hands, the first of whom dances with the Misbaha.

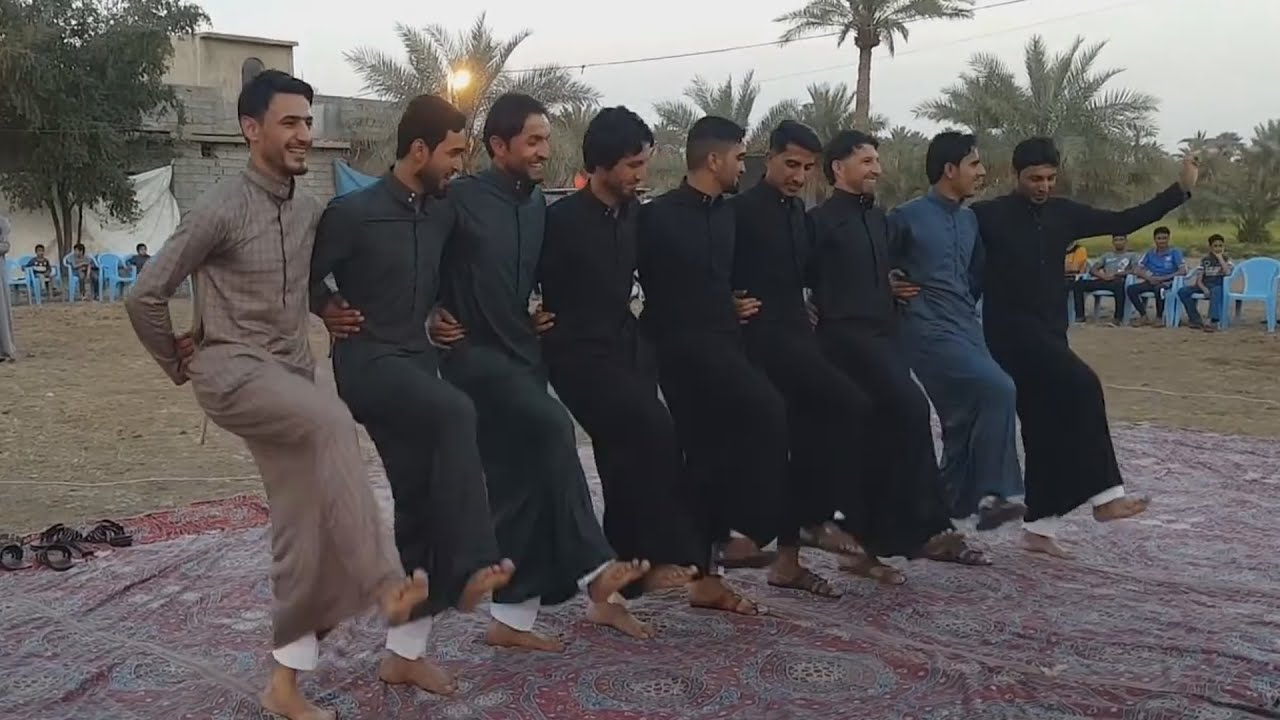
Ahl Al-Jawbi group are dancing
