= Vidar, Markazi =

Village in Markazi province, Iran

Vidar Persian: ويدر
- Village
- Location within Iran
- Coordinates: 35°19′31″N 50°06′46″E
- Country: Iran
- Province: Markazi
- County: Zarandiyeh
- District: Kharqan
- Rural District: Alvir

Population (2016)
  - Total: 497
- Time zone: UTC+3:30 (IRST)

Vidar (Persian: ويدر) (Note: Also romanized as Vīdar) is a village in Alvir Rural District of Kharqan District in Zarandiyeh County, Markazi province, Iran.

== Demographics ==
=== Language and ethnicity ===
The people of Vidar are Tat and speak Vidari Tati.

=== Population ===
At the time of the 2006 National Census, the village's population was 238 in 84 households. The following census in 2011 counted 183 people in 78 households. The 2016 census measured the population of the village as 497 people in 191 households.
