= Abbasabad, Kharqan =

Village in Markazi province, Iran

Abbasabad Persian: عباس اباد
- Village
- Location within Iran
- Coordinates: 35°22′48″N 49°59′02″E
- Country: Iran
- Province: Markazi
- County: Zarandiyeh
- District: Kharqan
- Rural District: Alvir

Population (2016)
  - Total: 411
- Time zone: UTC+3:30 (IRST)

Abbasabad (Persian: عباس اباد) (Note: Also romanized as ‘Abbāsābād) is a village in Alvir Rural District of Kharqan District in Zarandiyeh County, Markazi province, Iran.

== Demographics ==
=== Population ===
At the time of the 2006 National Census, the village's population was 424 in 130 households. The following census in 2011 counted 272 people in 88 households. The 2016 census measured the population of the village as 411 people in 133 households.
