= Aftabru =

Village in Markazi province, Iran

Aftabru Persian: افتابرو
- Village
- Location within Iran
- Coordinates: 35°28′23″N 50°03′58″E
- Country: Iran
- Province: Markazi
- County: Zarandiyeh
- District: Kharqan
- Rural District: Alvir

Population (2016)
  - Total: 81
- Time zone: UTC+3:30 (IRST)

Aftabru (Persian: افتابرو) (Note: Also romanized as Āftābrū) is a village in Alvir Rural District of Kharqan District in Zarandiyeh County, Markazi province, Iran.

== Demographics ==
=== Population ===
At the time of the 2006 National Census, the village's population was 87 in 23 households. The following census in 2011 counted 51 people in 13 households. The 2016 census measured the population of the village as 81 people in 24 households.
