= Ajan, Markazi =

Village in Markazi province, Iran

Ajan Persian: اجان
- Village
- Location within Iran
- Coordinates: 35°22′22″N 49°57′15″E
- Country: Iran
- Province: Markazi
- County: Zarandiyeh
- District: Kharqan
- Rural District: Duzaj

Population (2016)
  - Total: 337
- Time zone: UTC+3:30 (IRST)

Ajan (Persian: اجان) (Note: Also romanized as Ājān) is a village in Duzaj Rural District of Kharqan District in Zarandiyeh County, Markazi province, Iran.

== Demographics ==
=== Population ===
At the time of the 2006 National Census, the village's population was 246 in 72 households. The following census in 2011 counted 114 people in 37 households. The 2016 census measured the population of the village as 337 people in 116 households.
