= Band-e Amir, Markazi =

Village in Markazi province, Iran

Band-e Amir Persian: بندامير
- Village
- Location within Iran
- Coordinates: 35°16′10″N 50°03′00″E
- Country: Iran
- Province: Markazi
- County: Zarandiyeh
- District: Kharqan
- Rural District: Alvir

Population (2016)
  - Total: 335
- Time zone: UTC+3:30 (IRST)

Band-e Amir (Persian: بندامير) (Note: Also romanized as Band Amīr and Band-e Amīr) is a village in Alvir Rural District of Kharqan District in Zarandiyeh County, Markazi province, Iran.

== Demographics ==
=== Population ===
At the time of the 2006 National Census, the village's population was 132 in 44 households. The following census in 2011 counted 77 people in 29 households. The 2016 census measured the population of the village as 335 people in 117 households.
