= Alvir =

Village in Markazi province, Iran

Alvir Persian: الوير
- Village
- Location within Iran
- Coordinates: 35°23′12″N 50°00′08″E
- Country: Iran
- Province: Markazi
- County: Zarandiyeh
- District: Kharqan
- Rural District: Alvir

Population (2016)
  - Total: 578
- Time zone: UTC+3:30 (IRST)

Alvir (Persian: الوير) (Note: Also romanized as Alvīr; also known as Avīr) is a village in, and the capital of, Alvir Rural District in Kharqan District of Zarandiyeh County, Markazi province, Iran. The previous capital of the rural district was the village of Razeqan, now a city.

== Demographics ==
=== Language ===
The population speaks the Alviri-Vidari language.

=== Population ===
At the time of the 2006 National Census, the village's population was 435 in 167 households. The following census in 2011 counted 364 people in 145 households. The 2016 census measured the population of the village as 578 people in 213 households, the most populous in its rural district.
