= Akhtaj =

Village in Markazi province, Iran

Akhtaj Persian: اختاج
- Village
- Location within Iran
- Coordinates: 35°27′52″N 49°41′23″E
- Country: Iran
- Province: Markazi
- County: Zarandiyeh
- District: Kharqan
- Rural District: Alishar

Population (2016)
  - Total: 18
- Time zone: UTC+3:30 (IRST)

Akhtaj (Persian: اختاج) (Note: Also romanized as Ākhtāj; also known as Ākhtāch) is a village in Alishar Rural District of Kharqan District in Zarandiyeh County, Markazi province, Iran.

== Demographics ==
=== Population ===
At the time of the 2006 National Census, the village's population was 19 in five households. The following census in 2011 counted a population below the reporting threshold. The 2016 census measured the population of the village as 18 people in six households.
