= Ali Shar =

Ali Shar may refer to:

- A character in One Thousand and One Nights; see List of One Thousand and One Nights characters#Ali Shar
- Ali Shar, Iran, a village in Markazi Province, Iran
