= Varchand =

Village in Markazi province, Iran

Varchand Persian: ورچند
- Village
- Location within Iran
- Coordinates: 35°26′30″N 49°37′57″E
- Country: Iran
- Province: Markazi
- County: Zarandiyeh
- District: Kharqan
- Rural District: Alishar

Population (2016)
  - Total: 176
- Time zone: UTC+3:30 (IRST)

Varchand (Persian: ورچند) (Note: Also romanized as Warchānd; also known as Darjand and Varjand) is a village in Alishar Rural District of Kharqan District in Zarandiyeh County, Markazi province, Iran.

== Demographics ==
=== Population ===
At the time of the 2006 National Census, the village's population was 117 in 32 households. The following census in 2011 counted 185 people in 61 households. The 2016 census measured the population of the village as 176 people in 68 households.
