= Chahar Hadd =

Village in Markazi province, Iran

Chahar Hadd Persian: چهارحد
- Village
- Location within Iran
- Coordinates: 35°22′17″N 49°33′01″E
- Country: Iran
- Province: Markazi
- County: Zarandiyeh
- District: Kharqan
- Rural District: Duzaj

Population (2016)
  - Total: 463
- Time zone: UTC+3:30 (IRST)

Chahar Hadd (Persian: چهارحد) (Note: Also romanized as Chahār Ḩad and Chahār Ḩadd; also known as Chahār Hāt, Chār Ḩadd, and Chārhāt) is a village in Duzaj Rural District of Kharqan District in Zarandiyeh County, Markazi province, Iran.

== Demographics ==
=== Population ===
At the time of the 2006 National Census, the village's population was 193 in 48 households. The following census in 2011 counted 107 people in 34 households. The 2016 census measured the population of the village as 463 people in 142 households.
