= Tireh, Markazi =

Village in Markazi province, Iran

Tireh Persian: تيره
- Village
- Location within Iran
- Coordinates: 35°25′25″N 49°36′26″E
- Country: Iran
- Province: Markazi
- County: Zarandiyeh
- District: Kharqan
- Rural District: Duzaj

Population (2016)
  - Total: 198
- Time zone: UTC+3:30 (IRST)

Tireh (Persian: تيره) (Note: Also romanized as Tīreh) is a village in Duzaj Rural District of Kharqan District in Zarandiyeh County, Markazi province, Iran.

== Demographics ==
=== Population ===
At the time of the 2006 National Census, the village's population was 216 in 48 households. The following census in 2011 counted 186 people in 63 households. The 2016 census measured the population of the village as 198 people in 65 households.
