= Hesar, Zarandiyeh =

Village in Markazi province, Iran

Hesar Persian: حصار
- Village
- Location within Iran
- Coordinates: 35°26′09″N 49°54′45″E
- Country: Iran
- Province: Markazi
- County: Zarandiyeh
- District: Kharqan
- Rural District: Duzaj

Population (2016)
  - Total: 89
- Time zone: UTC+3:30 (IRST)

Hesar (Persian: حصار) (Note: Also romanized as Ḩeşār; also known as Ashahr) is a village in Duzaj Rural District of Kharqan District in Zarandiyeh County, Markazi province, Iran.

== Demographics ==
=== Population ===
At the time of the 2006 National Census, the village's population was 65 in 23 households. The following census in 2011 counted 31 people in 15 households. The 2016 census measured the population of the village as 89 people in 33 households.
