= Mil, Markazi =

Village in Markazi province, Iran

Mil Persian: ميل
- Village
- Location within Iran
- Coordinates: 35°26′40″N 50°00′13″E
- Country: Iran
- Province: Markazi
- County: Zarandiyeh
- District: Kharqan
- Rural District: Alvir

Population (2016)
  - Total: 172
- Time zone: UTC+3:30 (IRST)

Mil (Persian: ميل) (Note: Also romanized as Mīl) is a village in Alvir Rural District of Kharqan District in Zarandiyeh County, Markazi province, Iran.

== Demographics ==
=== Population ===
At the time of the 2006 National Census, the village's population was 276 in 76 households. The following census in 2011 counted 181 people in 50 households. The 2016 census measured the population of the village as 172 people in 57 households.
