= Musaabad, Kharqan =

Village in Markazi province, Iran

Musaabad Persian: موسي اباد
- Village
- Location within Iran
- Coordinates: 35°27′03″N 50°01′57″E
- Country: Iran
- Province: Markazi
- County: Zarandiyeh
- District: Kharqan
- Rural District: Alvir

Population (2016)
  - Total: Below reporting threshold
- Time zone: UTC+3:30 (IRST)

Musaabad (Persian: موسي اباد) (Note: Also romanized as Mūsáābād) is a village in Alvir Rural District of Kharqan District in Zarandiyeh County, Markazi province, Iran.

== Demographics ==
=== Population ===
At the time of the 2006 National Census, the village's population was 79 in 22 households. The following censuses in 2011 and 2016 counted a population below the reporting threshold.
