= Gorg Baghi =

Village in Markazi province, Iran

Gorg Baghi Persian: گرگ باغي
- Village
- Location within Iran
- Coordinates: 35°31′36″N 49°41′18″E
- Country: Iran
- Province: Markazi
- County: Zarandiyeh
- District: Kharqan
- Rural District: Alishar

Population (2016)
  - Total: 132
- Time zone: UTC+3:30 (IRST)

Gorg Baghi (Persian: گرگ باغي) (Note: Also romanized as Gorg Bāghī; also known as Bāgh Garā, Gar-i-Bāgh, Gar-i-Bāqi, Gorg Bāgh, and Kūr-e Bāgh) is a village in Alishar Rural District of Kharqan District in Zarandiyeh County, Markazi province, Iran.

== Demographics ==
=== Population ===
At the time of the 2006 National Census, the village's population was 221 in 52 households. The following census in 2011 counted 182 people in 53 households. The 2016 census measured the population of the village as 132 people in 40 households.
