= Boluband =

Village in Markazi province, Iran

Boluband Persian: بلوبند
- Village
- Location within Iran
- Coordinates: 35°17′57″N 50°02′01″E
- Country: Iran
- Province: Markazi
- County: Zarandiyeh
- District: Kharqan
- Rural District: Alvir

Population (2016)
  - Total: 426
- Time zone: UTC+3:30 (IRST)

Boluband (Persian: بلوبند) (Note: Also romanized as Bolūband; also known as Būlband and Bulupund) is a village in Alvir Rural District of Kharqan District in Zarandiyeh County, Markazi province, Iran.

== Demographics ==
=== Population ===
At the time of the 2006 National Census, the village's population was 144 in 53 households. The following census in 2011 counted 94 people in 33 households. The 2016 census measured the population of the village as 426 people in 138 households.
