= Kabud Kamar =

Village in Markazi province, Iran

Kabud Kamar Persian: كبودكمر
- Village
- Location within Iran
- Coordinates: 35°26′10″N 49°58′30″E
- Country: Iran
- Province: Markazi
- County: Zarandiyeh
- District: Kharqan
- Rural District: Duzaj

Population (2016)
  - Total: 517
- Time zone: UTC+3:30 (IRST)

Kabud Kamar (Persian: كبودكمر) (Note: Also romanized as Kabūd Kamar; also known as Kukmar) is a village in Duzaj Rural District of Kharqan District in Zarandiyeh County, Markazi province, Iran.

== Demographics ==
=== Population ===
At the time of the 2006 National Census, the village's population was 729 in 171 households. The following census in 2011 counted 411 people in 120 households. The 2016 census measured the population of the village as 517 people in 162 households.
