= Khizam =

Type of Omani headwear

Khizam خزام
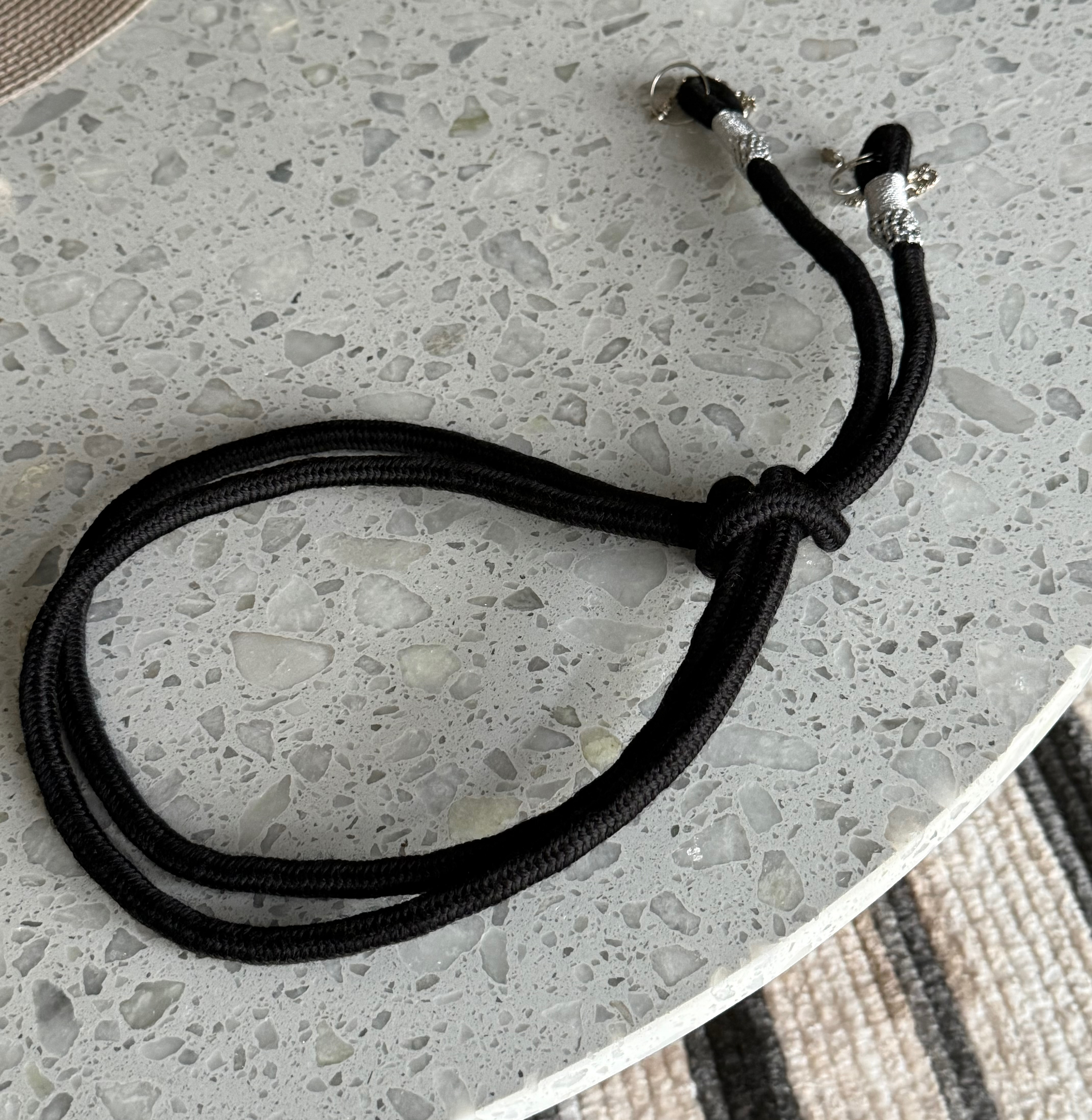
- The Khizam
- Type: Arab clothing
- Material: Wool
- Place of origin: Oman

The Khizam (Arabic: الخزام), also known as the Ṣaqā' (Arabic: صقاع) is an iqal traditionally worn by Omani men.

A doubled black cord, it is tied upon a Musar on the wearer's head. Traditionally made of wool, it ends with a round silver ring at one end and a silver chain on which the wearer hangs whatever silver jewellery he wants. Originally only worn by Bedouins to keep the Musar stable on the head whilst travelling in the desert, it has since spread beyond Bedouins and is worn across the nation.

== See also ==
- Ghutra
- Thawb
