= Amirabad, Zarandiyeh =

Village in Markazi province, Iran

Amirabad Persian: ورامه
- Village
- Location within Iran
- Coordinates: 35°26′47″N 49°43′22″E
- Country: Iran
- Province: Markazi
- County: Zarandiyeh
- District: Kharqan
- Rural District: Alishar

Population (2016)
  - Total: 404
- Time zone: UTC+3:30 (IRST)

Amirabad (Persian: اميراباد) (Note: Also romanized as Amīrābād; also known as Amīrābād-e Salī Darreh) is a village in Alishar Rural District of Kharqan District in Zarandiyeh County, Markazi province, Iran.

== Demographics ==
=== Population ===
At the time of the 2006 National Census, the village's population was 228 in 54 households. The following census in 2011 counted 171 people in 56 households. The 2016 census measured the population of the village as 191 people in 59 households.
