= Chelesban =

Village in Markazi province, Iran

Chelesban Persian: چلسبان
- Village
- Location within Iran
- Coordinates: 35°19′06″N 49°52′40″E
- Country: Iran
- Province: Markazi
- County: Zarandiyeh
- District: Kharqan
- Rural District: Alvir

Population (2016)
  - Total: 335
- Time zone: UTC+3:30 (IRST)

Chelesban (Persian: چلسبان) (Note: Also romanized as Chelasban, Chelasbān, and Chelesbān; also known as Chillis Pān) is a village in Alvir Rural District of Kharqan District in Zarandiyeh County, Markazi province, Iran.

== Demographics ==
=== Population ===
At the time of the 2006 National Census, the village's population was 557 in 169 households. The following census in 2011 counted 437 people in 141 households. The 2016 census measured the population of the village as 335 people in 125 households.
