= Duzaj =

Village in Markazi province, Iran

Duzaj Persian: دوزج
- Village
- Location within Iran
- Coordinates: 35°23′44″N 49°49′22″E
- Country: Iran
- Province: Markazi
- County: Zarandiyeh
- District: Kharqan
- Rural District: Duzaj

Population (2016)
  - Total: 117
- Time zone: UTC+3:30 (IRST)

Duzaj (Persian: دوزج) (Note: Also romanized as Dūzaj) is a village in, and the capital of, Duzaj Rural District in Kharqan District of Zarandiyeh County, Markazi province, Iran. It was the capital of Alishar Rural District until its capital was transferred to the village of Alishar.

== Demographics ==
=== Population ===
At the time of the 2006 National Census, the village's population was 120 in 46 households. The following census in 2011 counted 298 people in 74 households. The 2016 census measured the population of the village as 117 people in 52 households.
