= Berah Mum =

Village in Markazi province, Iran

Berah Mum Persian: بره موم
- Village
- Location within Iran
- Coordinates: 35°18′06″N 49°55′12″E
- Country: Iran
- Province: Markazi
- County: Zarandiyeh
- District: Kharqan
- Rural District: Alvir

Population (2016)
  - Total: 160
- Time zone: UTC+3:30 (IRST)

Berah Mum (Persian: بره موم) (Note: Also romanized as Barah Mūm and Berah Mūm; also known as Berah Mūn and Wīramain) is a village in Alvir Rural District of Kharqan District in Zarandiyeh County, Markazi province, Iran.

== Demographics ==
=== Population ===
At the time of the 2006 National Census, the village's population was 69 in 21 households. The following census in 2011 counted 52 people in 14 households. The 2016 census measured the population of the village as 160 people in 61 households.
