= Baryeh =

Village in Markazi province, Iran

Baryeh Persian: بريه
- Village
- Location within Iran
- Coordinates: 35°20′23″N 49°49′12″E
- Country: Iran
- Province: Markazi
- County: Zarandiyeh
- District: Kharqan
- Rural District: Duzaj

Population (2016)
  - Total: 82
- Time zone: UTC+3:30 (IRST)

Baryeh (Persian: بريه) is a village in Duzaj Rural District of Kharqan District in Zarandiyeh County, Markazi province, Iran.

== Demographics ==
=== Population ===
At the time of the 2006 National Census, the village's population was 44 in nine households. The following census in 2011 counted 49 people in 13 households. The 2016 census measured the population of the village as 82 people in 25 households.
