= Alishar, Iran =

Village in Markazi province, Iran

Alishar Persian: علي شار
- Village
- Location within Iran
- Coordinates: 35°25′40″N 49°47′47″E
- Country: Iran
- Province: Markazi
- County: Zarandiyeh
- District: Kharqan
- Rural District: Alishar

Population (2016)
  - Total: 1,048
- Time zone: UTC+3:30 (IRST)

Alishar (Persian: علي شار) (Note: Also romanized as ‘Alī Shār and ‘Alīshār) is a village in, and the capital of, Alishar Rural District in Kharqan District of Zarandiyeh County, Markazi province, Iran. The previous capital of the rural district was the village of Duzaj, now in Duzaj Rural District.

== Demographics ==
=== Population ===
At the time of the 2006 National Census, the village's population was 1,487 in 401 households. The following census in 2011 counted 1,367 people in 394 households. The 2016 census measured the population of the village as 1,048 people in 366 households, the most populous in its rural district.

== In literature ==
The 14th-century author Hamdallah Mustawfi listed Alishar as one of the main villages in the district of Kharraqan.
