= Warma =

Warma may refer to:

- Aleksander Warma (1890-1970), Estonian statesman
- Warma, Iran, a village in Markazi Province, Iran
- Warma people, a people of Benin

== See also ==
- Warmia
