= Eynabad, Markazi =

Village in Markazi province, Iran

Eynabad Persian: عين اباد
- Village
- Location within Iran
- Coordinates: 35°22′16″N 49°53′14″E
- Country: Iran
- Province: Markazi
- County: Zarandiyeh
- District: Kharqan
- Rural District: Duzaj

Population (2016)
  - Total: 98
- Time zone: UTC+3:30 (IRST)

Eynabad (Persian: عين اباد) (Note: Also romanized as ‘Eynābād; also known as Anār and Anāra) is a village in Duzaj Rural District of Kharqan District in Zarandiyeh County, Markazi province, Iran.

== Demographics ==
=== Population ===
At the time of the 2006 National Census, the village's population was 174 in 66 households. The following census in 2011 counted 132 people in 50 households. The 2016 census measured the population of the village as 98 people in 38 households.
