= Qeshlaq-e Moftabad =

Village in Markazi province, Iran

Qeshlaq-e Moftabad Persian: قشلاق مفت آباد
- Village
- Location within Iran
- Coordinates: 35°29′28″N 50°05′50″E
- Country: Iran
- Province: Markazi
- County: Zarandiyeh
- District: Kharqan
- Rural District: Alvir

Population (2016)
  - Total: 53
- Time zone: UTC+3:30 (IRST)

Qeshlaq-e Moftabad (Persian: قشلاق مفت آباد) (Note: Also romanized as Qeshlāq-e Moftābād) is a village in Alvir Rural District of Kharqan District in Zarandiyeh County, Markazi province, Iran. The 2016 census measured the population of the village as 53 people in 15 households.
