= Litham =

Mouth-veil worn by North African nomads

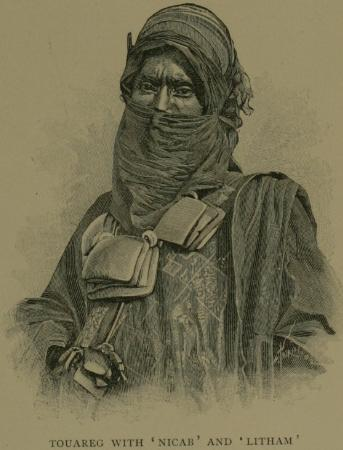
- Tuareg man wearing a litham
- Type: mouth-veil
- Material: cloth
- Place of origin: North Africa
- Manufacturer: Tuareg, and Sanhaja people

Litham (Arabic: لِثَام, romanized: lithām, sometimes pronounced lifam) is a mouth-veil which the Tuareg and other West and North African (namely Sahelian) nomads, particularly men, have traditionally used to cover the lower part of their face.

== Role and significance ==
The litham has served as protection from the dust and extremes of temperature characterizing the desert environment. In cases of blood feuds, it also served as protection against violence by making the wearer difficult to recognize. Wearing of the litham is not viewed as a religious requirement, although it was apparently thought to provide magical protection against evil forces.

== History and practice ==
Ancient African rock engravings depicting human faces with eyes but no mouth or nose suggest that the origins of litham are not only pre-Islamic but even pre-historic. The litham was commonly worn among the Berber Sanhaja tribes in north-west Africa. Its use by the Almoravids, who originated from a Sanhaja clan, gave it a political significance during their conquests in the 11th and 12th centuries. This practice gave rise to Almoravids being pejoratively nicknamed al-mulaththamun (the muffled ones). The Almohads, who succeeded the Almoravids as the dominant dynasty in the North African region, opposed the practice of wearing the litham, claiming that it is forbidden for men to imitate what they saw as "women's dress", but they never managed to suppress its use.

Among the Tuareg, men wear the litham, also called tagelmust, while women go unveiled. Tuareg boys start wearing the litham at the onset of puberty and the veil is regarded as a mark of manhood. It is considered improper for a man to appear unveiled in front of elders, especially those from his wife's family. The Tuareg litham is made of several pieces of Sudanese cloth which are sewn together to yield a strip about four yards long.

== Tagelmust and litham ==
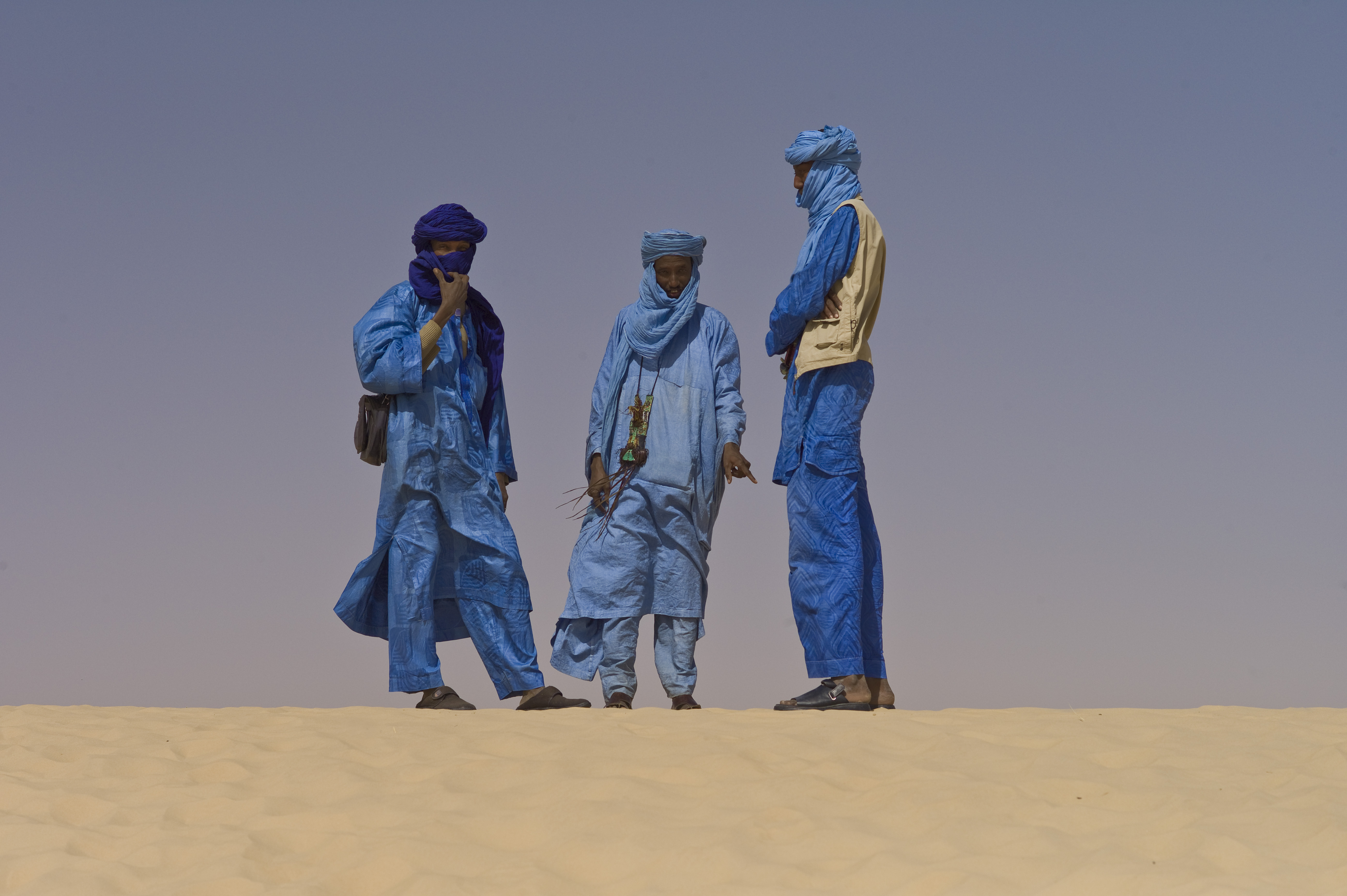
Tagelmusts, worn by three Tuareg men

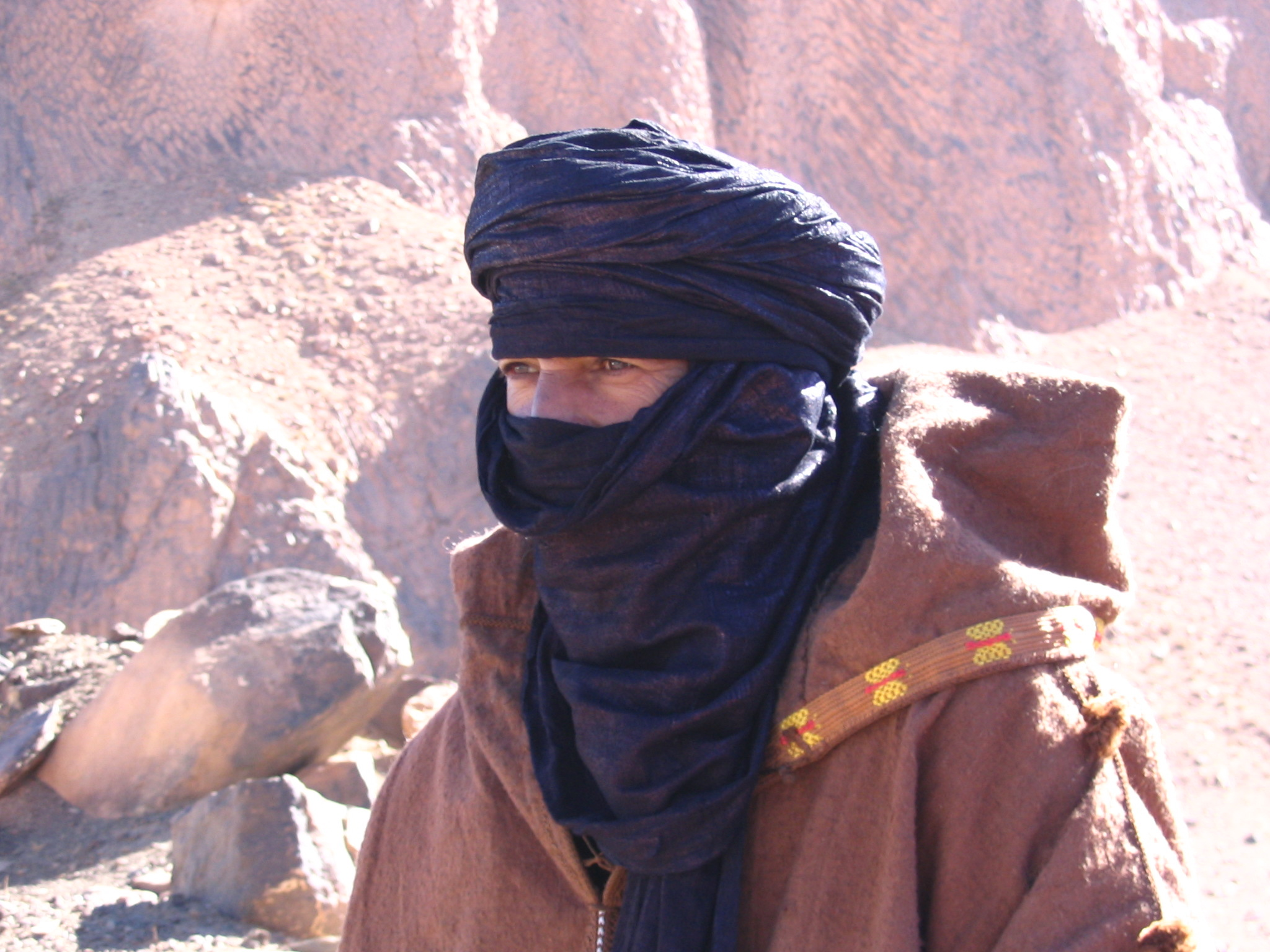
A tagelmust, worn by a man

The tagelmust (also known as cheich, cheche and litham) is an indigo-dyed cotton litham, with the appearance of both a veil and a turban. The cloth may exceed 10 metres (33 ft) in length. It is mostly worn by Tuareg Berber men, the Hausa of the far northern Sahel region and the Songhai. In recent times, other colors have come into use, with the indigo veils saved for use on special occasions. It usually has many layers that cover the head, and it drapes down to loosely cover the neck.

The tagelmust covers the head. It prevents the inhalation of wind-borne sand by its wearers in the Sahara region. The indigo is believed by many of the wearers to be healthy and beautiful, with a buildup of indigo in the skin of the wearer being generally considered to protect the skin, and denote affluence. Because of the scarcity of water, the tagelmust is often dyed by pounding in dried indigo instead of soaking it. The dye often permanently leaches into the skin of the wearer, and because of this, the Tuareg are often referred to as the "blue men of the desert".

Among the Tuareg, men who wear the tagelmust are called Kel Tagelmust lit. 'people of the veil'. The tagelmust is worn only by adult males and taken off only in the presence of close family. Tuareg men often find shame in showing their mouth or nose to strangers or people of a higher standing than themselves and have been known to hide their features using their hands if a tagelmust is unavailable. The tagelmust has other cultural significance, since the manner in which it is wrapped and folded is often used to show clan and regional origin, and the darkness to which it is dyed shows the wealth of the wearer.

== In literature and folklore ==
A number of legends were invented to explain the custom of male veiling. When one fell in battle and lost his litham, his friends could not recognize him until it was put back on. The word litham and its derivatives have been widely used in Arabic literature, in particular by the poets, who commonly employed puns between the general meaning of litham as veil and the verbal root lathama, which means "to kiss". In One Thousand and One Nights women use the litham to disguise themselves as men. The classical dictionary Lisan al-Arab by Ibn Manzur treats lifam as a separate word, describing it as a mouth veil worn by women.

== See also ==
- Agal (accessory)
- Alasho, a similar turban veil worn by Hausa men
- Bisht
- Hejazi turban
- Imama Turban
- Islam and clothing
- Izaar
- Keffiyeh
- Niqāb, the Arabic term for a face veil worn by women
- Pandama, worn by Mandaean men
- Sirwal
- Taqiyah
- Thawb
- Types of hijab
