= Lar, Markazi =

Village in Markazi province, Iran

Lar Persian: لار
- Village
- Location within Iran
- Coordinates: 35°22′11″N 49°42′38″E
- Country: Iran
- Province: Markazi
- County: Zarandiyeh
- District: Kharqan
- Rural District: Duzaj

Population (2016)
  - Total: 142
- Time zone: UTC+3:30 (IRST)

Lar (Persian: لار) (Note: Also romanized as Lār) is a village in Duzaj Rural District of Kharqan District in Zarandiyeh County, Markazi province, Iran.

== Demographics ==
=== Population ===
At the time of the 2006 National Census, the village's population was 149 in 51 households. The following census in 2011 counted 124 people in 45 households. The 2016 census measured the population of the village as 142 people in 56 households.
