= Azbizan =

Village in Markazi province, Iran

Azbizan Persian: ازبيزان
- Village
- Location within Iran
- Coordinates: 35°18′15″N 49°53′46″E
- Country: Iran
- Province: Markazi
- County: Zarandiyeh
- District: Kharqan
- Rural District: Alvir

Population (2016)
  - Total: 194
- Time zone: UTC+3:30 (IRST)

Azbizan (Persian: ازبيزان) (Note: Also romanized as Azbīzān; also known as Azbazān, Azbezān, and Azbīzan) is a village in Alvir Rural District of Kharqan District in Zarandiyeh County, Markazi province, Iran.

== Demographics ==
=== Population ===
At the time of the 2006 National Census, the village's population was 454 in 134 households. The following census in 2011 counted 194 people in 66 households. The 2016 census measured the population of the village as 194 people in 80 households.
