= Manjinqan =

Village in Markazi province, Iran

Manjinqan Persian: منجينقان
- Village
- Location within Iran
- Coordinates: 35°21′46″N 49°50′24″E
- Country: Iran
- Province: Markazi
- County: Zarandiyeh
- District: Kharqan
- Rural District: Duzaj

Population (2016)
  - Total: 273
- Time zone: UTC+3:30 (IRST)

Manjinqan (Persian: منجينقان) (Note: Also romanized as Manjīnqān; also known as Manjeghan, Manjeqān, Menjqān, and Minjgān) is a village in Duzaj Rural District of Kharqan District in Zarandiyeh County, Markazi province, Iran.

== Demographics ==
=== Population ===
At the time of the 2006 National Census, the village's population was 287 in 76 households. The following census in 2011 counted 213 people in 61 households. The 2016 census measured the population of the village as 273 people in 86 households.
