= Mullah =

Title commonly given to local Islamic clerics or mosque leaders

Mullah (/ˈmʌlə, ˈmʊlə, ˈmuːlə/) is an honorific title for Muslim clergy and imams. The term is widely used in Iran, Afghanistan, Pakistan, India, and Bangladesh, Azerbaijan, Central Asia, and parts of Russia (such as the North Caucasus and the Volga-Ural region). the term applies to religious figures ranging from local village prayer leaders to scholars with higher education in Islamic theology and Shariah.

Mullahs, in formal terms, are graduates of a madrasa in countries such as Afghanistan and Pakistan. In the more rural areas of Central Asia, Russia, and the Caucasus, however, the title has been applied informally for generations to any literate Muslim who can recite the Quran and lead prayers in the local mosque. In these communities, they serve as mosque imams, deliver sermons, and perform religious rites such as birth and funeral ceremonies.

The title has also been used in some Mizrahi, Iranian (Persian), Afghan, Bukharian, Kaifeng, and Sephardic Jewish communities in reference to the community's leadership, especially its religious leadership.

Since the 1980s, the term has developed to have a pejorative connotation in certain contexts, especially in India.

A mullah with his students in Artvin (then part of the Russian Empire, now in northeastern Turkey), early 20th century

== Etymology ==
The word mullah is derived from the Persian word mullā (Persian: ملا), itself borrowed from the Arabic word mawlā (Arabic: مولى), meaning "master" and "guardian", with mutation of the initial short vowels.

== Usage ==
=== Historical usage ===
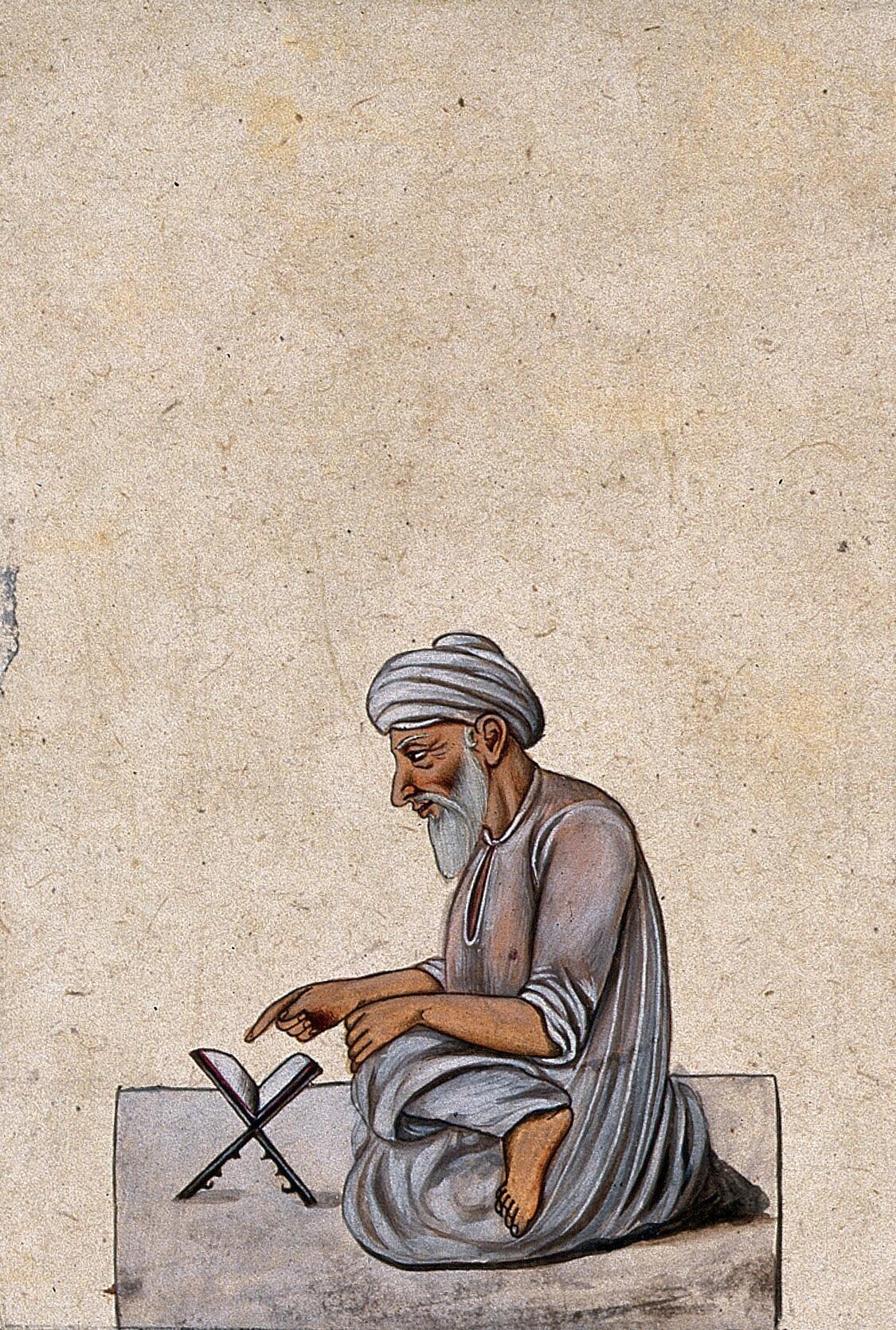
Painting of a mullah (Muslim scholar) reading a book. Gouache by an Indian artist, c. 19th century

The term has also been used among Iranian Jews, Bukharian Jews, and Afghan Jews to refer to the community's religious and/or secular leadership. In Kaifeng, China, the historic Chinese Jews who managed the synagogue were called "mullahs".

=== Modern usage ===
It is the term commonly used for village or neighborhood mosque leaders in large parts of the Muslim world, particularly Iran, Turkey, Caucasus, Central Asia, West Asia, South Asia, Eastern Arabia, the Balkans and the Horn of Africa. In other regions, a different term may be used, such as imam in the Maghreb.

In Afghanistan and Pakistan, the title is given to graduates of a madrasa or Islamic school, who are then able to become a mosque leader, a teacher at a religious school, a local judge in a village or town, or to perform religious rituals. A person who is still a student at a madrasa and yet to graduate is a talib.

The Afghan Taliban was formed in 1994 by men who had graduated from, or at least attended, madrasas. They called themselves taliban, the plural of talib, or "students". Many of the leaders of the Taliban were titled Mullah, although not all had completed their madrasa education. Someone who goes on to complete postgraduate religious education receives the higher title of Mawlawi.

In India, the title is used more generally to denote a 'Muley' or Muslim Jat.

In Iran, until the early 20th century, the term mullah was used in Iranian seminaries to refer to low-level clergy who specialized in telling stories of Ashura, rather than teaching or issuing fatwas. However, in recent years, among Shia clerics, the term ruhani (spiritual) has been promoted as an alternative to mullah, which, since at least the 1980s, has developed a pejorative connotation, and is even considered a religious slur in certain contexts (especially in India and Iran).

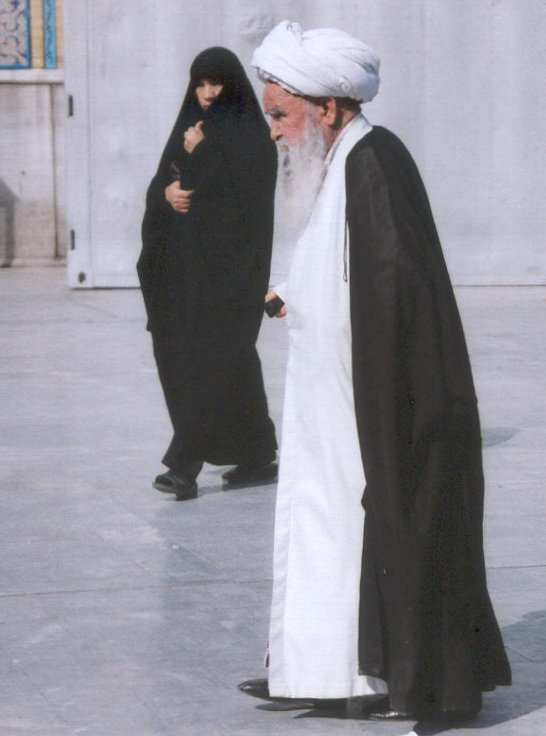
Iranian mullah and a veiled woman in Qom, Iran

== Training and duties ==
Ideally, a trained mullah will have studied the traditional Islamic sciences, not limited to:

- Classical Arabic
  - Naḥw (syntax)
  - Sarf (word morphology)
  - Balagha (rhetoric)
  - Shi'r (poetry)
  - Adab (literature)
- Tarikh (history)
- Fiqh (Islamic law)
  - Rulings pertaining to their school of jurisprudence and the rulings of other schools of jurisprudence
  - The principles of jurisprudence pertaining to their school of jurisprudence and the principles of other schools of jurisprudence
  - The evidences of their school of thought for principles and rulings, the evidences of others, how they differ and why
- Hadith (Islamic traditions)
  - Exegesis
  - The principles of exegesis
- Aqidah (Islamic creed)
- Mantiq (logic)
- Ilm-ul-Kalaam (Islamic scholastic theology)
- The Quran
  - The meanings of the Quran
  - the principles and rules of Quranic exegesis
- Tasawwuf or Sufism (mystic practices in Islam)

Some mullahs will specialise in certain fields after completing the above foundational studies. Common specialties are:

- Takhassus fil Iftah – after which they qualify as a mufti and can issue fatwas (legal rulings)
- Takhassus fil Hadith – specialisation in hadith studies
- Takhassus fil Aqidah – specialisation in aqidah studies

Such figures often have memorized the Quran, and historically would memorise all the books they studied. However in the modern era they instead memorise the founding books of each field (sometimes in the form of poetry to aid memorisation).

Uneducated villagers may frequently classify a literate Muslim with a less than complete Islamic training as their "mullah" or religious cleric. Mullahs with varying levels of training lead prayers in mosques, deliver religious sermons, and perform religious ceremonies such as birth rites and funeral services. Three kinds of knowledge are applied most frequently in interpreting Islamic texts (i.e. the Quran, hadiths, etc.) for matters of Shariah, i.e., Islamic law.

Mullahs have frequently been involved in politics, but only recently have they served in positions of power, since Shia Islamists seized power in Iran in 1979.

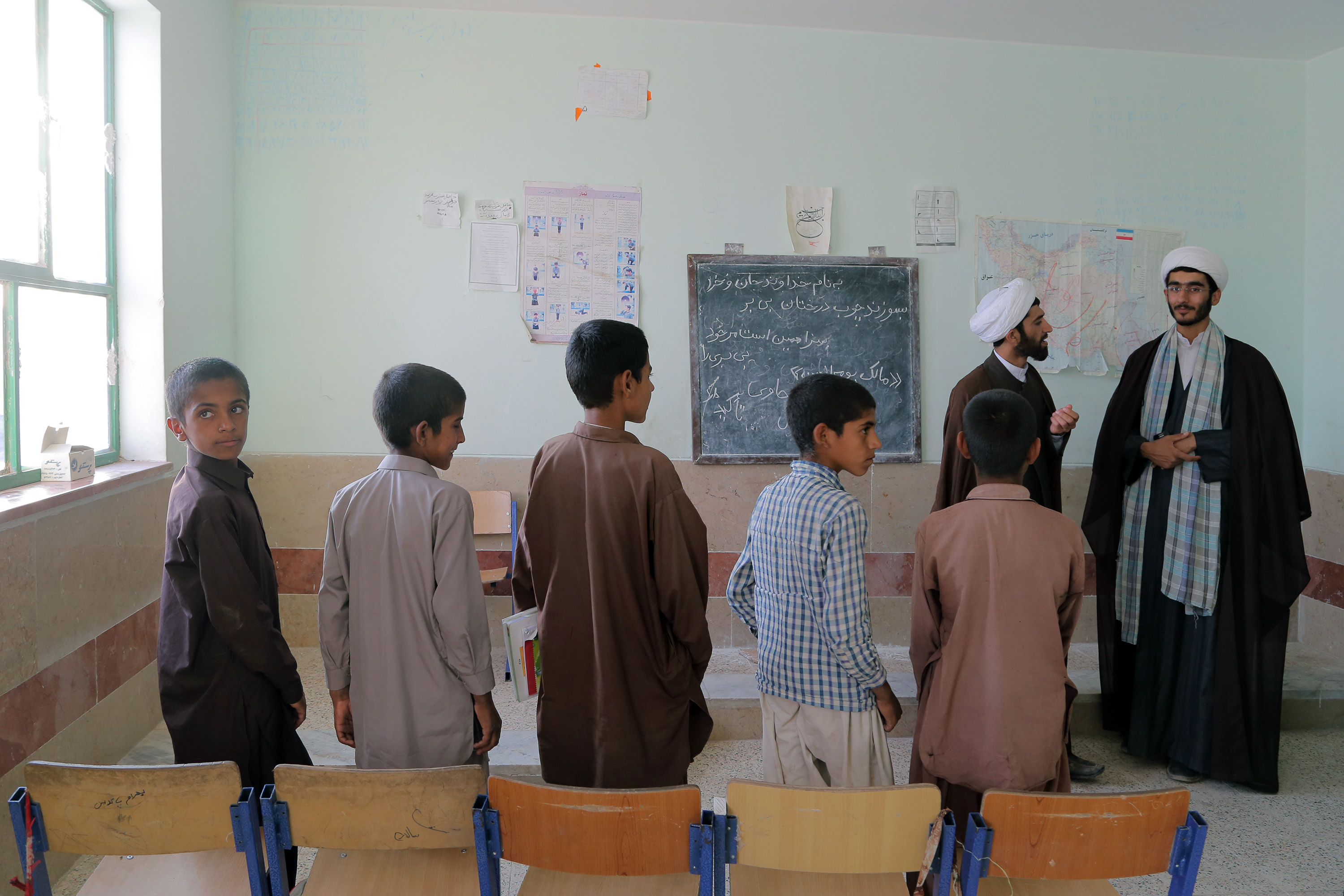
Mullahs in Iran teaching children

== Dress ==
The dress of a Mullah usually consists of a type of turban called an ammama, a long coat with sleeves and buttons called a qaba (similar to a cassock), and a long gown or cloak, open at the front, known as a rada. The rada is usually made either of brown wool or black muslin, and is sleeveless but has holes through which the arms may be inserted. In Shiism, the turban is usually white, but those who are sayyid may wear a black turban.

An Iranian Shia mullah in traditional clerical attire (wearing an ammama turban and aba cloak) reading the Quran on a public bus

== See also ==
Other Islamic honorifics and titles

- Allamah
- Marja'
- Maulana
- Maulvi
- Mohyeddin
- Seghatoleslam
- Sheikh
- Ulema - Muslim legal scholars

Related topics

- Darul uloom - a type of Islamic school
