= Razeqan =

City in Markazi province, Iran

Razeqan Persian: رازقان
- City
- Location within Iran
- Coordinates: 35°19′50″N 49°57′19″E
- Country: Iran
- Province: Markazi
- County: Zarandiyeh
- District: Kharqan
- Established as a city: 2000

Population (2016)
  - Total: 826
- Time zone: UTC+3:30 (IRST)

Razeqan (Persian: رازقان) (Note: Also romanized as Rāzeqān and Rāzqān, also known as Razeghi) is a city in, and the capital of, Kharqan District in Zarandiyeh County, Markazi province, Iran. As a village, it served as the capital of Alvir Rural District until its capital was transferred to the village of Alvir. The village of Razeqan was converted to a city in 2000.

== Demographics ==
=== Population ===
At the time of the 2006 National Census, the city's population was 426 in 138 households. The following census in 2011 counted 497 people in 152 households. The 2016 census measured the population of the city as 826 people in 290 households.
