= Massar =

Massar may refer to:

== People ==
- Frank Massar, British martial artist
- Kathryn Johnston Massar, Little League baseball player
- Robert J. Massar, founding partner of Dearborn-Massar

== Other ==
- 18946 Massar, an asteroid
- Al-Massar, an alternate name for Tunisian political party Social Democratic Path

== See also ==
- Masar (disambiguation)
