= Alvir Rural District =

Rural district in Markazi province, Iran

Alvir Rural District Persian: دهستان الوير
- Rural District
- Location within Iran
- Coordinates: 35°22′N 50°01′E
- Country: Iran
- Province: Markazi
- County: Zarandiyeh
- District: Kharqan
- Established: 1987
- Capital: Alvir

Population (2016)
  - Total: 3,463
- Time zone: UTC+3:30 (IRST)

Alvir Rural District (Persian: دهستان الوير) is in Kharqan District of Zarandiyeh County, Markazi province, Iran. Its capital is the village of Alvir. The previous capital of the rural district was the village of Razeqan, now a city.

== Demographics ==
=== Population ===
At the time of the 2006 National Census, the rural district's population was 3,187 in 1,046 households. There were 2,110 inhabitants in 734 households at the following census of 2011. The 2016 census measured the population of the rural district as 3,463 in 1,240 households. The most populous of its 20 villages was Alvir, with 578 people.

=== Other villages in the rural district ===
- Abbasabad
- Aftabru
- Azbizan
- Band-e Amir
- Berah Mum
- Boluband
- Chelesban
- Mil
- Musaabad
- Qeshlaq-e Moftabad
- Vesmaq
- Vidar
