= Alviri-Vidari dialect =

Tati language of Iran

Alviri-Vidari
- Native to: Iran
- Language family: Indo-European: Indo-Iranian; Iranian; Western; Northwestern; Adharic; Tatic; Southern Tatic; Alviri-Vidari
- Dialects: Alvir; Vidar

Language codes
- ISO 639-3: avd
- Glottolog: alvi1241
- ELP: Alviri-Vidari

Alviri-Vidari (Tati: الویری-ویدری) is a dialect of the Tati language spoken in Iran, near Saveh in the Markazi Province. Alvir and Vidar are the villages of its speakers.

== Phonology ==
Alviri consonants are the same as those of Persian.

== Grammar ==
Alviri, similar to many other Tati dialects, has preserved grammatical gender distinctions.

== Works cited ==
Yarshater, Ehsan (1964). "The Dialects of Alvir and Vidar". In Redard, Georges (ed.). Indo-Iranica: Mélanges présentés à Georg Morgenstierne. Wiesbaden: Harrassowitz. pp. 177–187.
