= Meserqan =

Village in Markazi province, Iran

Meserqan Persian: مصرقان
- Village
- Location within Iran
- Coordinates: 35°22′00″N 49°46′18″E
- Country: Iran
- Province: Markazi
- County: Zarandiyeh
- District: Kharqan
- Rural District: Duzaj

Population (2016)
  - Total: 892
- Time zone: UTC+3:30 (IRST)

Meserqan (Persian: مصرقان) (Note: Also romanized as Meşerqān; also known as Masar Ghan and Mīsarqān) is a village in Duzaj Rural District of Kharqan District in Zarandiyeh County, Markazi province, Iran.

== Demographics ==
=== Population ===
At the time of the 2006 National Census, the village's population was 452 in 143 households. The following census in 2011 counted 864 people in 258 households. The 2016 census measured the population of the village as 892 people in 227 households, the most populous in its rural district.
