= Masr =

Masr may refer to:

- Egypt, "Masr" is the name for Egypt in Egyptian Arabic.
- Masr, Iran, a village in Isfahan Province, Iran.

== See also ==
- Masar (disambiguation)
