= Alishar Rural District =

Rural district in Markazi province, Iran

Alishar Rural District Persian: دهستان عليشار
- Rural District
- Location within Iran
- Coordinates: 35°29′N 49°49′E
- Country: Iran
- Province: Markazi
- County: Zarandiyeh
- District: Kharqan
- Established: 1987
- Capital: Alishar

Population (2016)
  - Total: 1,969
- Time zone: UTC+3:30 (IRST)

Alishar Rural District (Persian: دهستان عليشار) is in Kharqan District of Zarandiyeh County, Markazi province, Iran. Its capital is the village of Alishar. The previous capital of the rural district was the village of Duzaj.

== Demographics ==
=== Population ===
At the time of the 2006 National Census, the rural district's population was 2,349 in 626 households. There were 2,093 inhabitants in 629 households at the following census of 2011. The 2016 census measured the population of the rural district as 1,969 in 669 households. The most populous of its six villages was Alishar, with 1,048 people.

=== Other villages in the rural district ===
- Akhtaj
- Amirabad
- Gorg Baghi
- Varameh
- Varchand
