= Chenaqchi-ye Olya =

Village in Markazi province, Iran

Chenaqchi-ye Olya Persian: چناقچي عليا
- Village
- Location within Iran
- Coordinates: 35°22′35″N 49°39′36″E
- Country: Iran
- Province: Markazi
- County: Zarandiyeh
- District: Kharqan
- Rural District: Duzaj

Population (2016)
  - Total: 178
- Time zone: UTC+3:30 (IRST)

Chenaqchi-ye Olya (Persian: چناقچي عليا) (Note: Also romanized as Chenāqchī-ye 'Olyā and Chonāqchī-ye 'Olyā; also known as Chenāqchī-ye Bālā, Chunāqcheh 'Uliya, and Janāqchī-ye Bālā) is a village in Duzaj Rural District of Kharqan District in Zarandiyeh County, Markazi province, Iran.

== Demographics ==
=== Population ===
At the time of the 2006 National Census, the village's population was 262 in 74 households. The following census in 2011 counted 210 people in 59 households. The 2016 census measured the population of the village as 178 people in 51 households.
