= Varameh =

Village in Markazi province, Iran

Varameh Persian: ورامه
- Village
- Location within Iran
- Coordinates: 35°26′36″N 49°52′34″E
- Country: Iran
- Province: Markazi
- County: Zarandiyeh
- District: Kharqan
- Rural District: Alishar

Population (2016)
  - Total: 404
- Time zone: UTC+3:30 (IRST)

Varameh (Persian: ورامه) (Note: Also romanized as Varāmeh; also known as Warma) is a village in Alishar Rural District of Kharqan District in Zarandiyeh County, Markazi province, Iran.

== Demographics ==
=== Population ===
At the time of the 2006 National Census, the village's population was 277 in 82 households. The following census in 2011 counted 180 people in 64 households. The 2016 census measured the population of the village as 404 people in 130 households.
