= Vesmaq, Zarandiyeh =

Village in Markazi province, Iran

Vesmaq Persian: وسمق
- Village
- Location within Iran
- Coordinates: 35°18′20″N 50°04′30″E
- Country: Iran
- Province: Markazi
- County: Zarandiyeh
- District: Kharqan
- Rural District: Alvir

Population (2016)
  - Total: 179
- Time zone: UTC+3:30 (IRST)

Vesmaq (Persian: وسمق) (Note: Also romanized as Vasmaq; also known as Vīsmāch) is a village in Alvir Rural District of Kharqan District in Zarandiyeh County, Markazi province, Iran.

== Demographics ==
=== Population ===
At the time of the 2006 National Census, the village's population was 292 in 123 households. The following census in 2011 counted 172 people in 73 households. The 2016 census measured the population of the village as 179 people in 71 households.
