= Chenaqchi-ye Sofla =

Village in Markazi province, Iran

Chenaqchi-ye Sofla Persian: چناقچي سفلي
- Village
- Location within Iran
- Coordinates: 35°25′02″N 49°39′59″E
- Country: Iran
- Province: Markazi
- County: Zarandiyeh
- District: Kharqan
- Rural District: Duzaj

Population (2016)
  - Total: 378
- Time zone: UTC+3:30 (IRST)

Chenaqchi-ye Sofla (Persian: چناقچي سفلي) (Note: Also romanized as Chanāqchī-ye Soflá, Chenāqchī-ye Soflá, and Chonāqchī-ye Soflá; also known as Chanāqchī-ye Pā’īn and Chunāqcheh Sufla) is a village in Duzaj Rural District of Kharqan District in Zarandiyeh County, Markazi province, Iran.

== Demographics ==
=== Population ===
At the time of the 2006 National Census, the village's population was 377 in 89 households. The following census in 2011 counted 370 people in 89 households. The 2016 census measured the population of the village as 378 people in 125 households.
