= Duzaj Rural District =

Rural district in Markazi province, Iran

Duzaj Rural District Persian: دهستان دوزج
- Rural District
- Location within Iran
- Coordinates: 35°22′N 49°44′E
- Country: Iran
- Province: Markazi
- County: Zarandiyeh
- District: Kharqan
- Established: 1995
- Capital: Duzaj

Population (2016)
  - Total: 3,797
- Time zone: UTC+3:30 (IRST)

Duzaj Rural District (Persian: دهستان دوزج) is in Kharqan District of Zarandiyeh County, Markazi province, Iran. Its capital is the village of Duzaj.

== Demographics ==
=== Population ===
At the time of the 2006 National Census, the rural district's population was 3,314 in 916 households. There were 3,109 inhabitants in 918 households at the following census of 2011. The 2016 census measured the population of the rural district as 3,797 in 1,190 households. The most populous of its 16 villages was Meserqan, with 892 people.

=== Other villages in the rural district ===
- Ajan
- Baryeh
- Chahar Hadd
- Chenaqchi-ye Olya
- Chenaqchi-ye Sofla
- Eynabad
- Hesar
- Kabud Kamar
- Lar
- Manjinqan
- Tireh
