= Masar (surname) =

Masar (Slovak/Czech: Masár, Masař; feminine: Masárová, Masařová) are occupational surnames meaning butcher in some Slavic languages. Notable people with the surname include:

- Dušan Masár (born 1962), Czech wrestler
- Ella Masar (born 1986), American-Canadian soccer player
- Felix Masár (born 1955), Czechoslovak canoeist
- Rebeka Masarova (born 1999) Spanish tennis player
- Vladimír Masár (born 1958), Slovak economist
