= Vasmaq, Tafresh =

Vasmaq وسمق
- Village
- Location within Iran
- Coordinates: 34°54′43″N 49°35′01″E
- Country: Iran
- Province: Markazi
- County: Tafresh
- Bakhsh: Central
- Rural District: Rudbar

Population (2006)
  - Total: 175
- Time zone: UTC+3:30 (IRST)
  - Summer (DST): UTC+4:30 (IRDT)

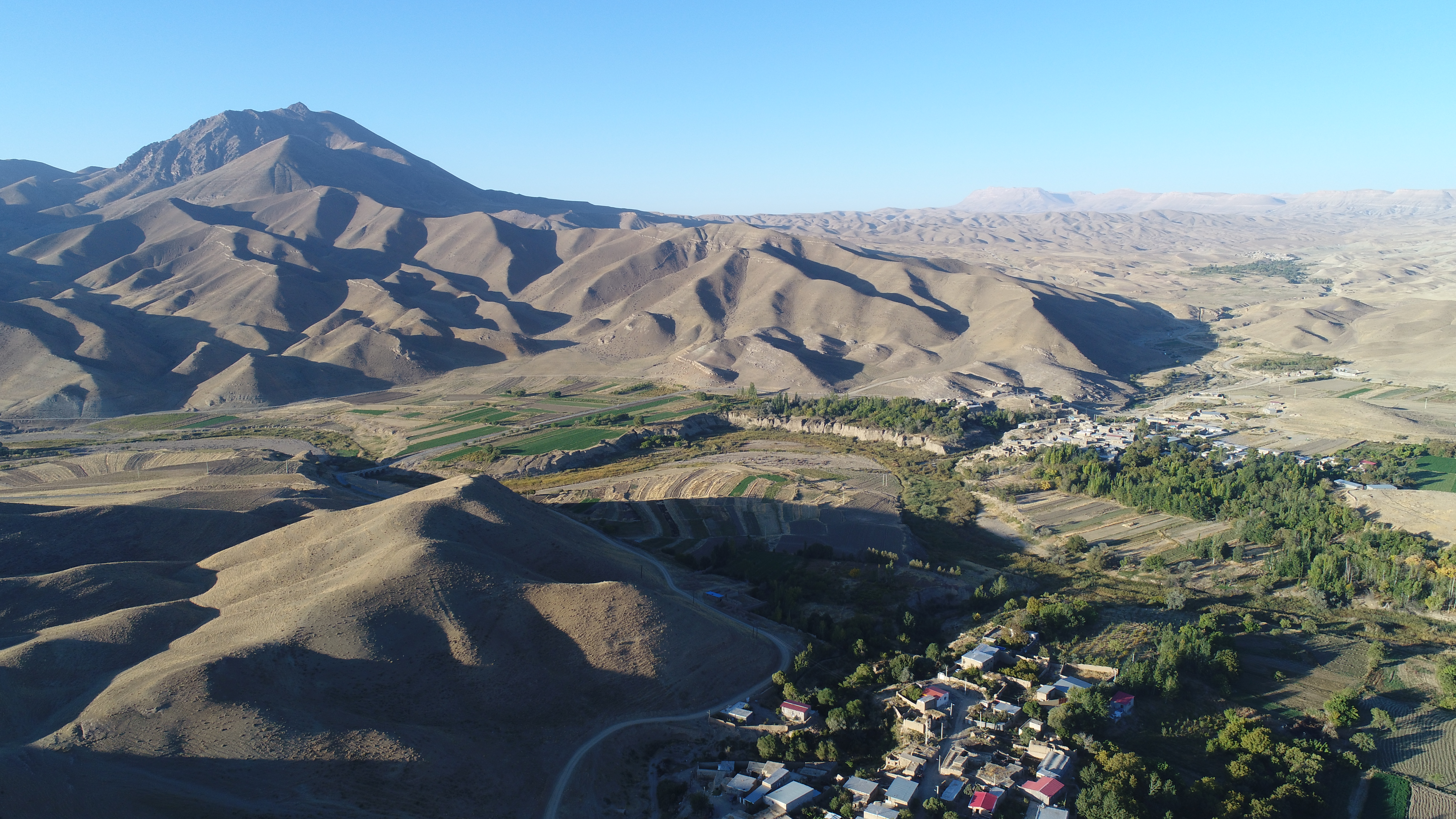
A view from Mount Amjak towards southwest; Vasmaq is on the middle right side of the

Vasmaq (Persian: وسمق; also known as Vashmak) is a village in Rudbar Rural District, in the Central District of Tafresh County, Markazi Province, Iran. At the 2006 census, its population was 175, in 49 families.
