= Agal (accessory) =

Cord that secures a keffiyeh on the head

Agal عِقَال
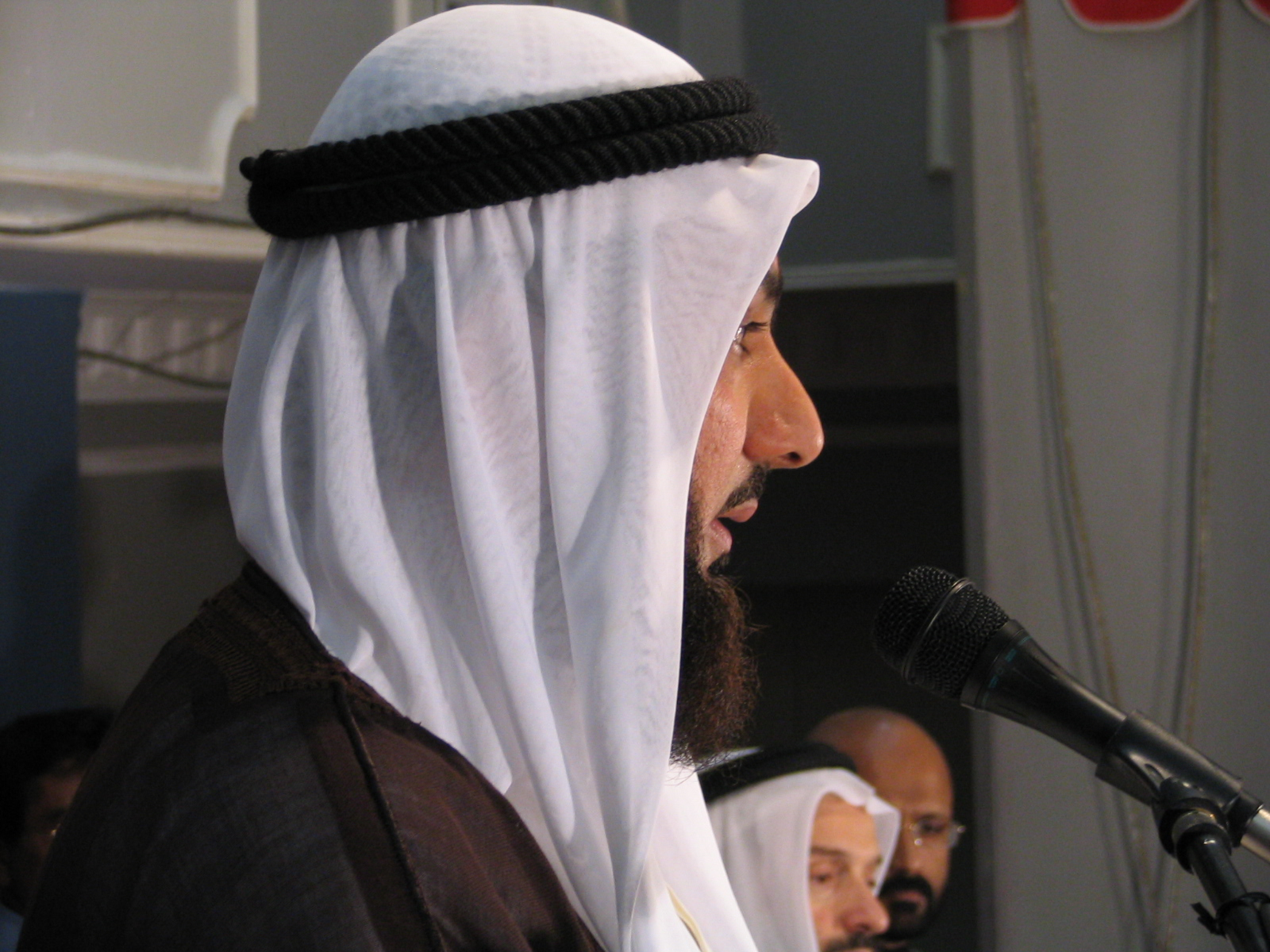
- A man wearing a white keffiyeh with an agal on top of it
- Type: Arab clothing
- Material: Goat hair
- Place of origin: Arabian Peninsula

An agal (Arabic: عِقَال; also spelled iqal, egal, or igal) is a clothing accessory traditionally worn by tribal Arab men. It is a doubled black cord used to keep a keffiyeh in place on the wearer's head. Agals are traditionally made of goat or camel hair. Modern agals typically use cord manufactured for this purpose (rulers of Bahrain in particular are known for wearing elaborate agal designs), but plain rope is still occasionally utilized.

It is traditionally worn by Arabs from the Arabian Peninsula (except Yemen and Oman), Iraq, Jordan, tribes in Syria, Sinai and Sharqia in Egypt, the south of the Maghreb, parts of Palestine, the Negev in Israel, and Khuzestan in Iran.

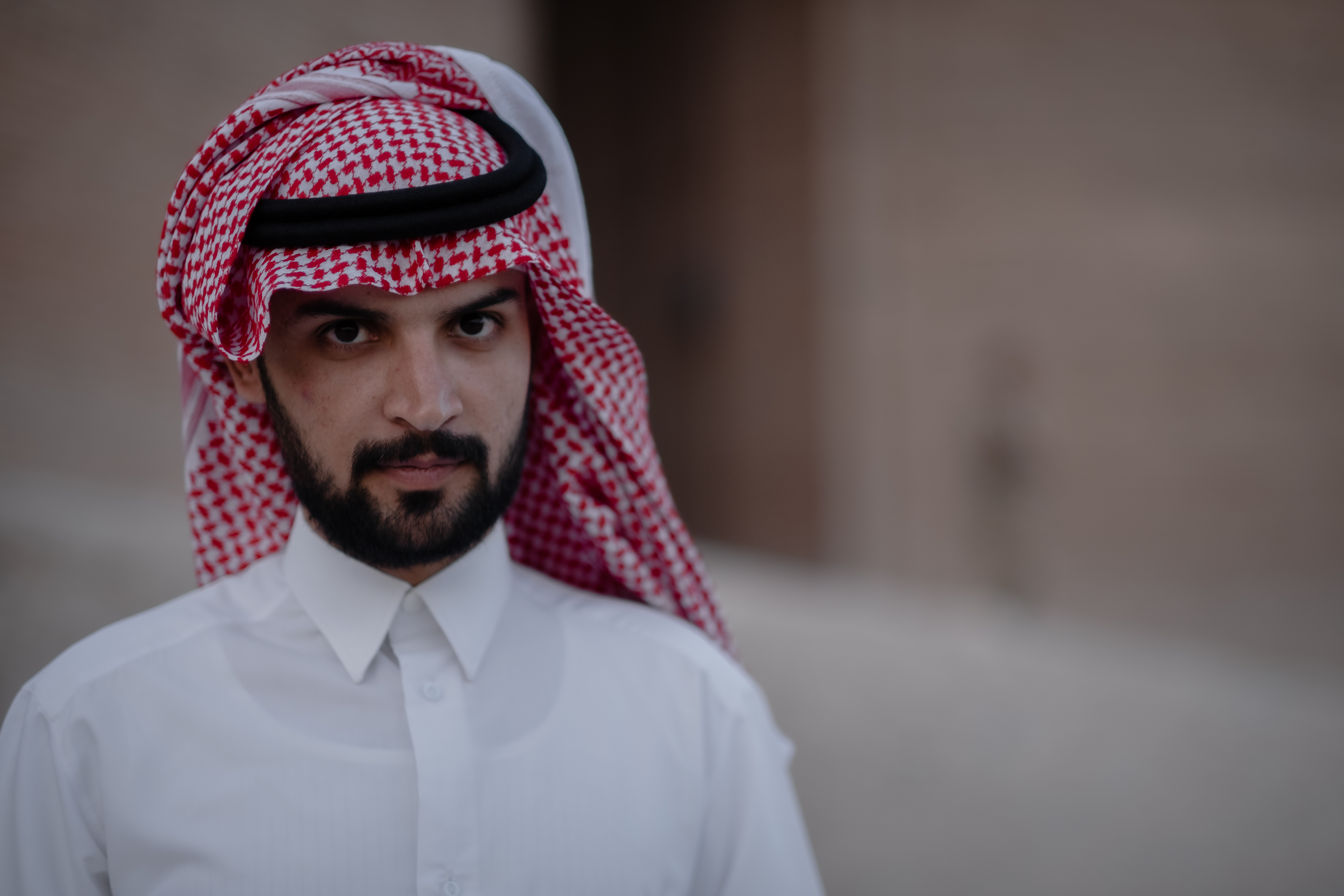
An Iraqi man wearing the agal over a keffiyeh

The use of the agal and ghutra is depicted in bas-reliefs and statues across the Middle East dating as far back as ancient times. In his book Iran in the Ancient East, the archaeologist and Iranologist Ernst Herzfeld, in referring to the Susa bas-reliefs, points to the ancient agal as unique headwear of Elamites that distinguished them from other nations.

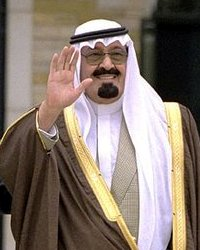
King Abdullah of Saudi Arabia wearing the agal.

== See also ==
- Khizam
- Shemagh
- Bisht
- Izar
- Litham
- Sirwal
- Taqiyah
- Thawb
- Keffiyeh

== Sources ==
- Lindisfarne, N.; Ingham, B. (1997). "Head wear". Languages of Dress in the Middle East. Curzon. pp. 45–47. ISBN 978-0-7007-0671-6.
