= Ammama =

Type of headwear for Muslim men

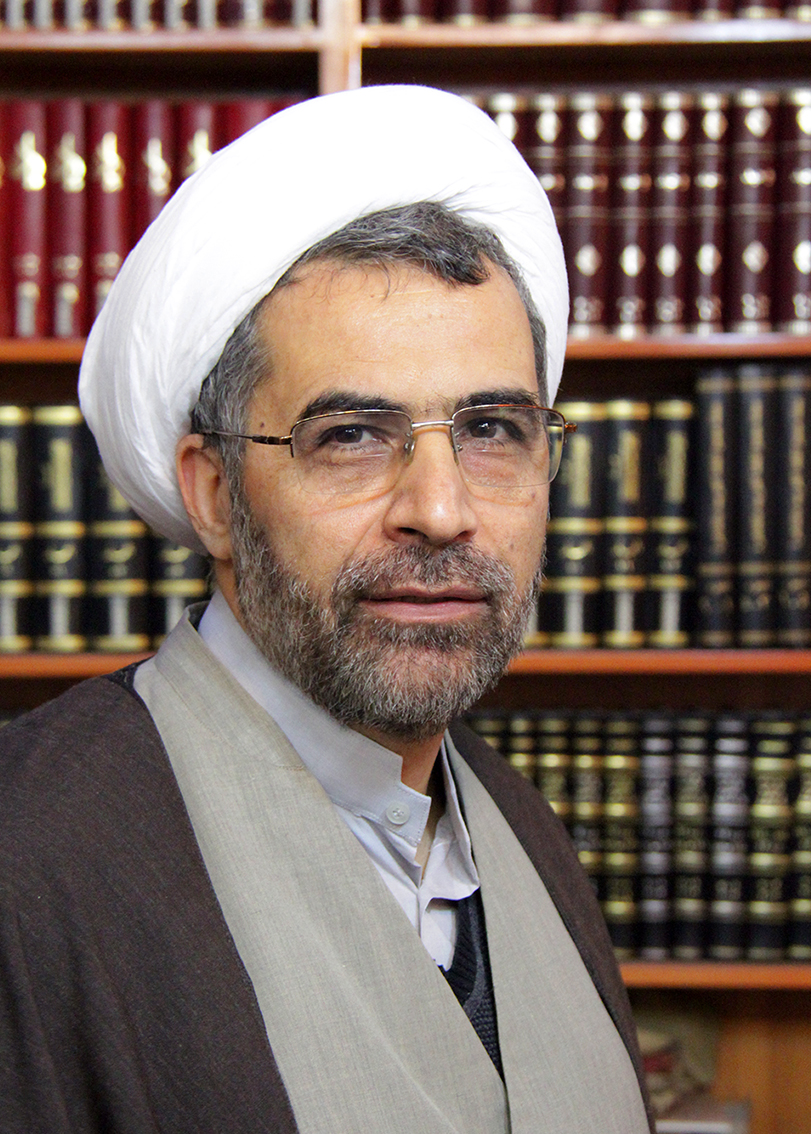
Rasul Jafarian with a turban

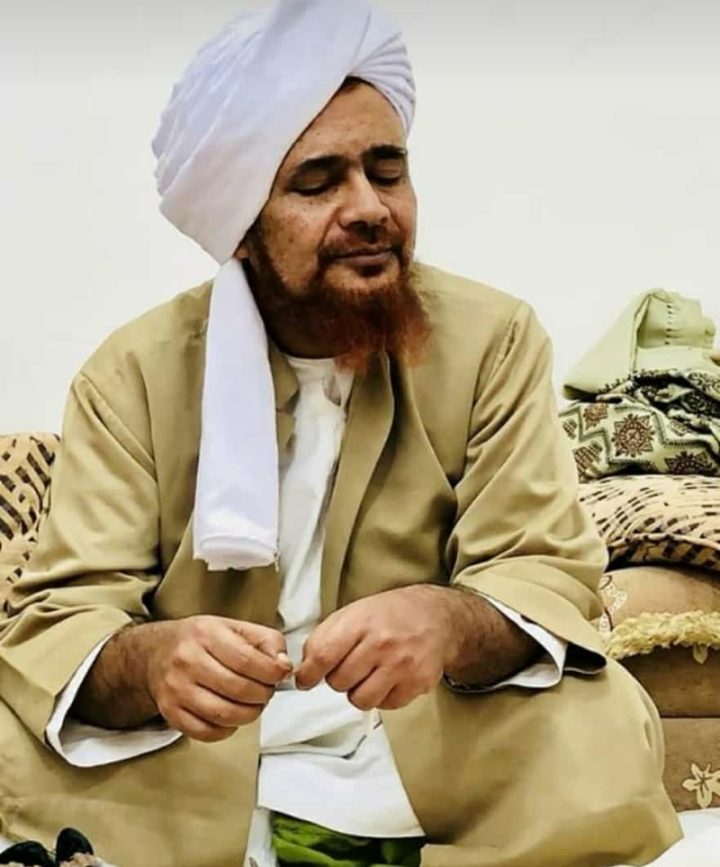
Habib Umar bin Hafiz wearing an Imama.

Imama or Ammama or 'Emma (Persian : عمامه, Arabic: عمامة; Egyptian Arabic: عمة IPA: [ˈʕem.mæ] or AMMĀMA, Arabic ʿEMĀMA) is a type of turban.

It is symbolically significant to Muslim men. It is common especially with men in Iran, Afghanistan and Yemen, as well as North Africa. Wearing this headgear symbolizes authority, strength and honor.

The Muslim headwear for men typically consists of two portions. The first portion is the solid cap, known as a taqiyah. The second portion is the outer cloth wrap, known as an Imama (the turban). Some scholars instruct Muslim men to either wear both together, or none at all, as a way to distinguish Muslim men from non-Muslim men.

== Hadith sources of the custom ==
Amamma wearing is mentioned in the Hadith literature.

Abu Dawud mentioned in his Sunan that Muhammad said, "The difference between us and the pagans is that we wear the 'imama on top of the qalansuwa," therefore Muslim men must wear both pieces or neither.

Also, Muslim men by hadith are instructed to follow a specific style of the turban wrapping, with the excess length hanging behind the back of the neck. "The best and most authentic style is to allow the loose end to hang from the back between the shoulder blades".

It has also been related that Muhammad said "Adopt wearing the turban for indeed it is the mantle of the Angels and hang the tail of it on your backs!" [Tabarānī, al-Kabīr from Ibn ʿUmar; Bayhaqī, Shuʿab al-Īman].

It has also been related that Muhammad said "Increase in discernment! Turbans are the crowns of the Arabs." [Bayhaqī, Shuʿab al-Īman from Usamah bin ʿUmayr ].

Muslim men are not required to wear the Imama during prayer, although it is preferred to do so. Wearing the full Imama is an act of Sunnah.

Some hadith state it is preferred that regular Muslim men wear normal sized Imama, while scholars should wear larger ones to distinguish themselves visually. “In the Qunya [it is stated], ‘A long turban and the wearing of spacious clothing is commendable (hasan) for the scholars who are the signs of guidance as opposed to all other people.” [Zada, Majma` al-Anhur]

== See also ==
- Jellabiya
