= Keffiyeh =

Traditional headdress worn by men in the Middle East

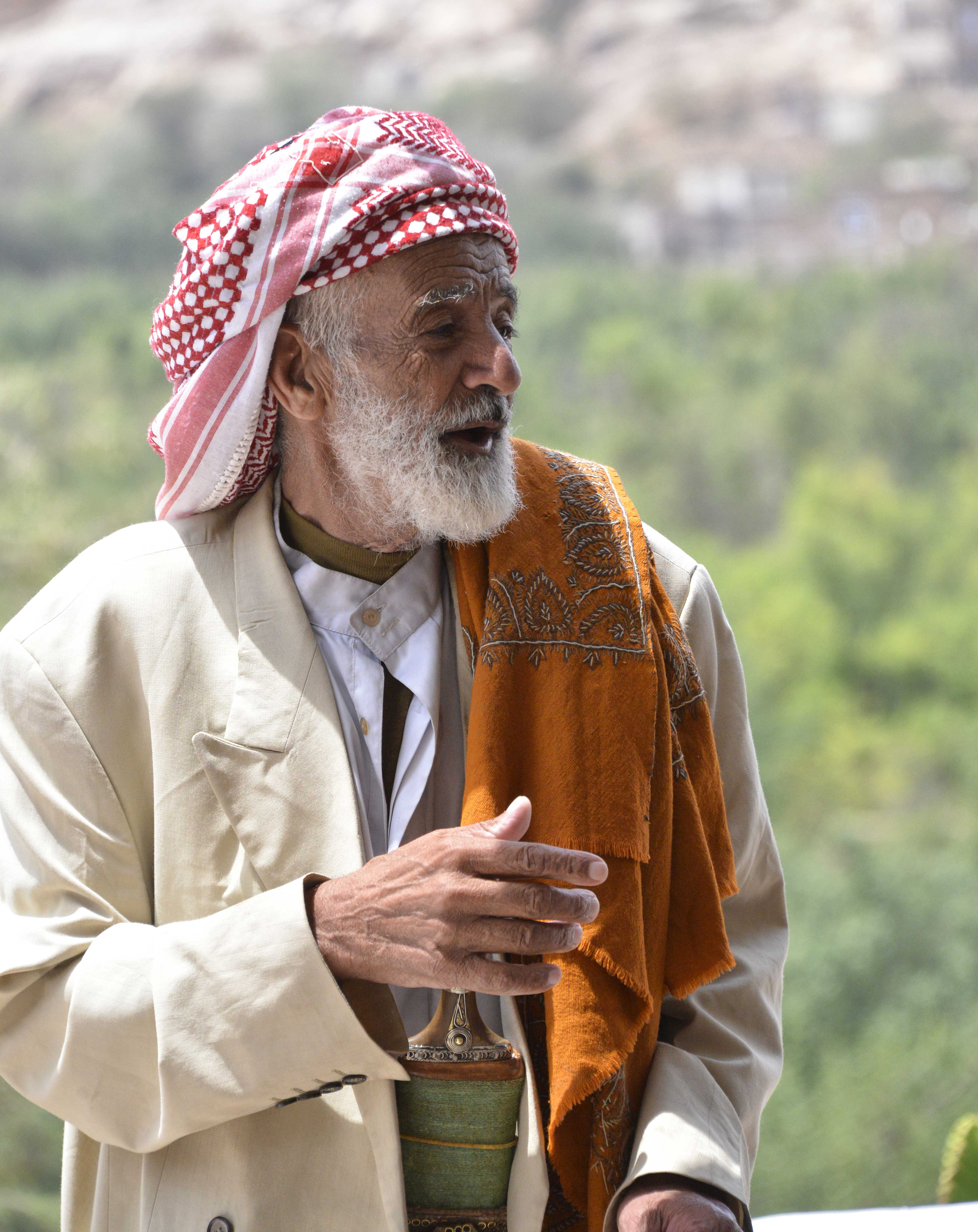
Yemeni man wearing a keffiyeh in turban-style and a Yemeni shawl on his shoulder

The keffiyeh (Arabic: كُوفِيَّة, romanized: kūfīyah), also regionally known as a hattah (حَطَّة, ḥaṭṭa), ghutrah (غُتْرَة), shemagh (شُمَاغ),sudra (Hebrew: סוּדָר; Aramaic: סודרא) or chafiyeh (Persian: چَفْیِه) is a traditional headdress worn by men from parts of the Middle East and North Africa. It is fashioned from a square scarf, and is usually made of cotton. The keffiyeh is commonly found in arid regions, as it protects from sunburn, dust, and sand. A head cord, agal, is often used by Arabs to keep the keffiyeh in place.

== Etymology ==
=== Keffiyeh ===
The word keffiyeh appeared in Arabic after the Crusades, and probably descends from a European loanword, sharing an etymology with the English "coif". Some argue that it was imported indirectly through Arabic: الكفة, "cuff".

Murtada al-Zabidi derives keffiyeh from Arabic: الكهف, "cave", due to the rounded shape of the headscarf. A folk etymology associates it with the city of Kufa, Iraq.

=== Ghutrah ===
The word ghutrah (Arabic: غُتْرَة, romanized: ḡutra) comes from the Arabic root ghatr (غتر) which means "to cover". The early pictures of Arabs invariably show them wearing turbans, and it is unclear when the keffiyeh became acceptable for the upper classes. While the written reports of ghutrah date back to the early 18th century, the earliest known picture is from the 19th century (Abdullah bin Saud Al Saud, made before his execution in 1819).

=== Sudra ===
The etymology of sudra is disputed. Ernest Klein traces the term to Greek soudárion, borrowed from Latin sūdārium, meaning a handkerchief or cloth for wiping perspiration, whereas Marcus Jastrow considered the resemblance to the Latin word coincidental. The Babylonian Talmud also offers a traditional interpretation connecting the word to the Hebrew phrase sod Adonai lire'av (סוד ה׳ ליראיו), meaning "The secret of the Lord is with those who fear Him", from Psalm 25:14.

== Origin ==
Headscarves are used by various communities throughout the arid regions of the Middle East as protection against the sun, wind, sand, and dust. The keffiyeh was traditionally associated among Bedouins as a practical protection from the sun.

== Varieties and variations ==
Man wearing a white ghutrah with black agal

Middle Eastern Arabs, Kurds, Chaldo-Assyrians, Jews, and Yazidis wear this headpiece. According to Anastas al-Karmali, Johannes Cotovicus mentioned a 16th-century Jewish keffiyeh. Historically, after contact with Arabs, some Kurds abandoned their traditional turban in favor of the keffiyeh and agal. Iraqi Turkmen wear it and call it Jamadani, while Omanis call it a mussar. No matter its name, it is available in multiple colours and styles with many different methods of tying it, depending on regional origin and the nature of occasion. Omanis do not use the agal, instead tying it over the kuma for formal occasions.

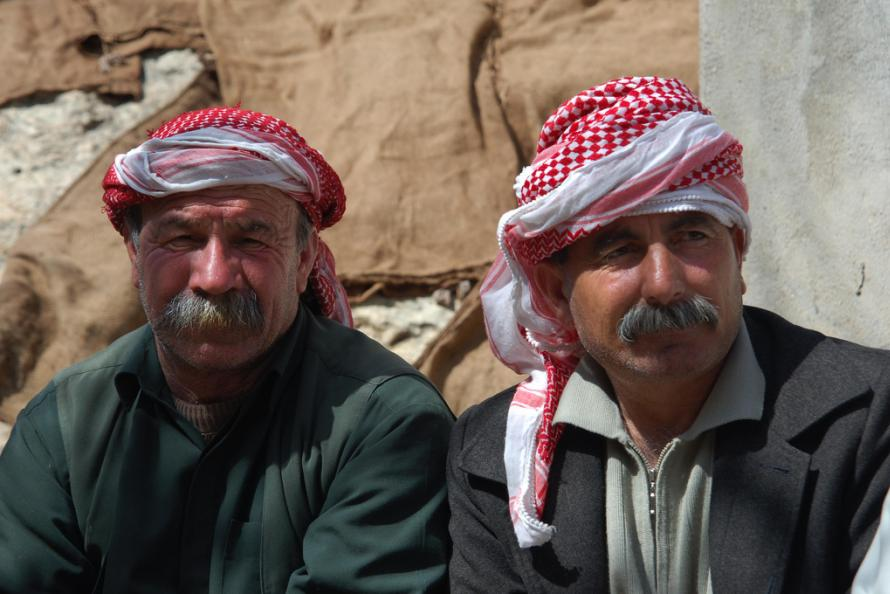
Yazidi men wearing keffiyehs

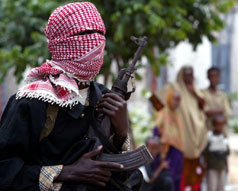
Somali insurgent wearing keffiyeh during the Ethiopian occupation of Somalia

During his sojourn with the Marsh Arabs of Iraq, Gavin Young noted that the local sayyids—"venerated men accepted [...] as descendants of the Prophet Muhammad and Ali ibn Abi Talib"—wore dark green keffiyeh in contrast to the black-and-white checkered examples typical of the area's inhabitants.

=== Jordanian shemagh ===
Another type of keffiyeh is the shemagh, which is a scarf that is red-and-white, checkered and has tassels. The bigger the tassels, the more important the person. This red-and-white keffiyeh is associated with Jordan and is its national symbol. The shemagh is worn mostly in Jordan and by Bedouin communities. It is made from cotton. The Jordanian shemagh and the Palestinian keffiyeh are different in regard to color and geographical meanings.

=== Palestinian keffiyeh ===
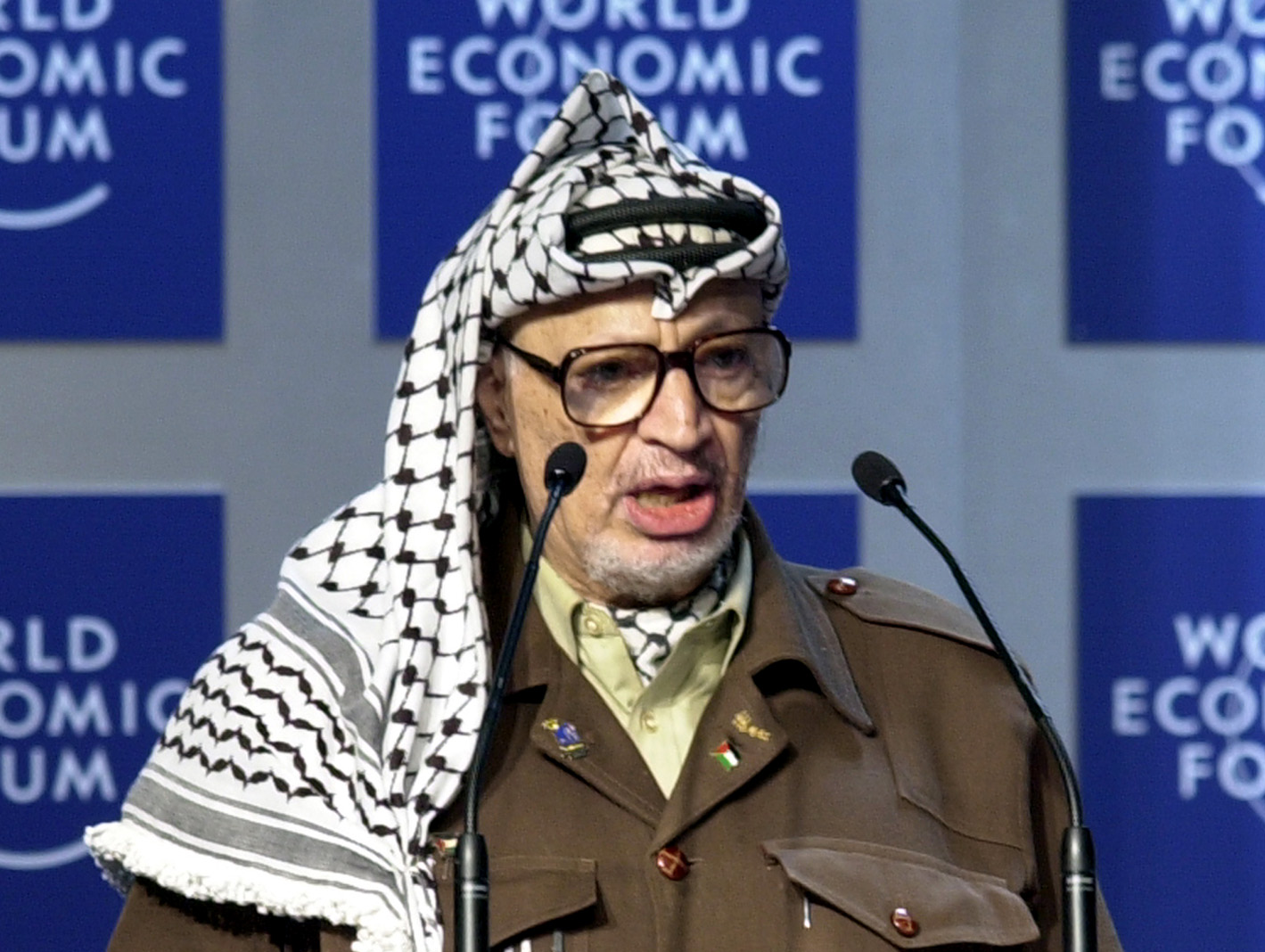
Yasser Arafat wearing his iconic fishnet pattern keffiyeh in 2001

Prior to the 1930s, Arab villagers and peasants wore the white keffiyeh and agal (rope) while city residents and the educated elite wore the Ottoman tarbush (fez). During the 1936–1939 Arab revolt in Palestine, Arab rebel commanders ordered all Arabs to don the keffiyeh. In 1938, British Mandatory High Commissioner in Palestine, Harold MacMichael, reported to the Foreign Office: "This ‘order’ has been obeyed with surprising docility and it is not an exaggeration to say that in a month eight out of every ten tarbushes in the country had been replaced by the [keffiyeh and] ‘agal’." Following the end of the revolt, most residents either reverted to wearing the tarbush or elected to go hatless.

The black and white chequered keffiyeh dates to the 1950s when Sir John Bagot Glubb, a British officer, wanted to distinguish his Palestinian soldiers (black and white keffiyeh) from his Jordanian forces (red and white keffiyeh).

The black and white keffiyeh’s prominence increased during the 1960s with the beginning of the Palestinian resistance movement and its adoption by Palestinian leader Yasser Arafat.

From the mid-20th century onward, the Palestinian keffiyeh became increasingly associated with Palestinian national identity, a process shaped by broader political developments and symbolic usage, including its prominence in the public image of Yasser Arafat. The Palestinian keffiyeh functions primarily as a politicized symbol of Palestinian national identity and solidarity. It is widely used in protests and political imagery regarding the conflict, both locally, and internationally.

=== Jewish sudra ===
Historical Jewish head coverings in the Middle East also included the sudra (Hebrew: סודר; Aramaic: סודרא), a wrapped cloth worn as a head covering or scarf. The sudra is mentioned in the Babylonian Talmud and was used as a kerchief or turban in Babylonia during in the .

=== Other shemagh variations ===
Other regional shemagh variations are the Egyptian Sinai shemagh and the Saudi shemagh (also known as a ghutrah).

== Other cultural symbolisms ==
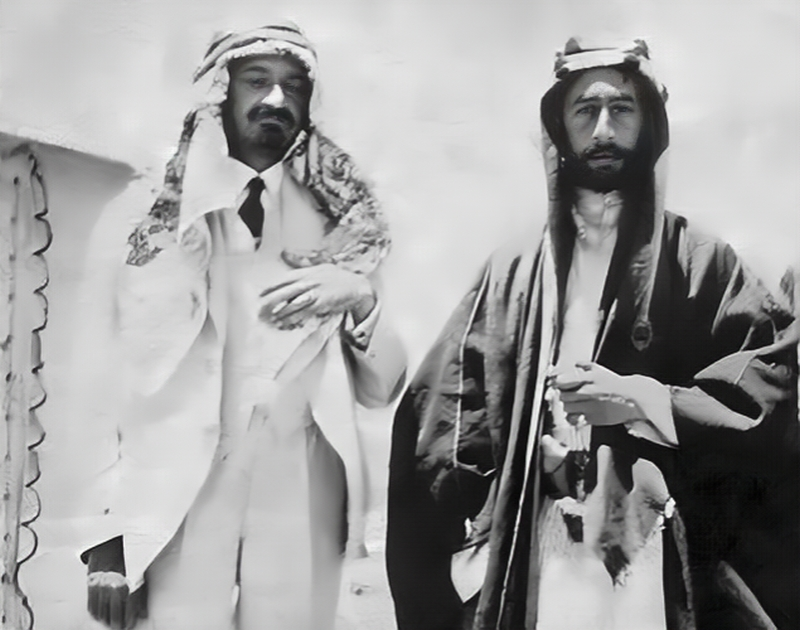
Faisal I and Chaim Weizmann wearing keffiyehs during a 1918 meeting

Early Jewish migrants to Mandatory Palestine adopted the Keffiyeh because they saw it as part of the authentic local lifestyle. Up until the 2000s, Turkey banned the keffiyeh because it was considered a symbol of solidarity with the PKK.

== Non-regional use of keffiyeh ==
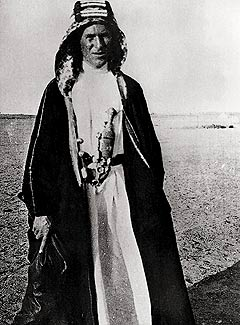
T. E. Lawrence at Rabegh, north of Jeddah, in 1917

British Colonel T. E. Lawrence (better known as Lawrence of Arabia) was probably the best-known Western wearer of the keffiyeh and agal during his involvement in the Arab Revolt in World War I. This image of Lawrence was later popularized by the film epic about him, Lawrence of Arabia, in which he was portrayed by Peter O'Toole.

Some Zionist immigrants to Ottoman Palestine and British Mandatory Palestine are documented as having worn the keffiyeh in certain contexts, particularly among specific youth movements, agricultural workers, and members of early defense organizations such as Hashomer. In some cases, this reflected practical use in a local environment, while in others it was part of broader cultural and visual trends in which local dress was incorporated into identity formation. Studio photography from the period also shows some Jewish residents dressed in local style clothing, including the keffiyeh, as part of staged portraits that reflected contemporary aesthetic and cultural influences.

The 1920s' silent-film era of American cinema saw studios take to Orientalist themes of the exotic Middle East, possibly due to the view of Arabs as part of the Allies of World War I, and keffiyehs became a standard part of the theatrical wardrobe. These films and their male leads typically had Western actors in the role of an Arab, often wearing the keffiyeh with the agal (as with The Sheik and The Son of the Sheik, starring actor Rudolph Valentino).

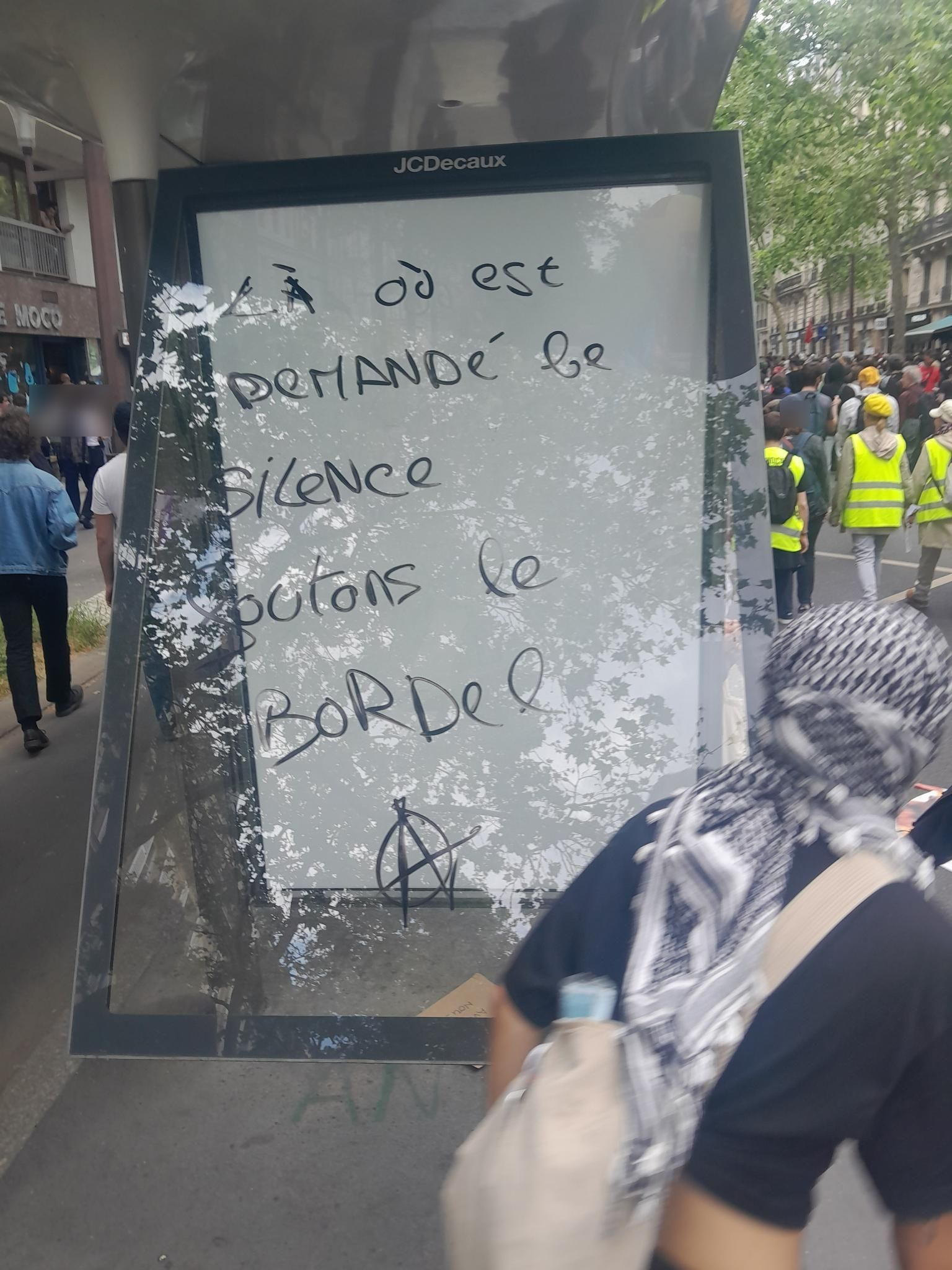
Anarchist with a keffiyeh next to a vandalized ad pannel reading : 'When they ask for silence, let's make chaos Ⓐ', Paris 2026

During the Iraq and Afghanistan wars, members of the United States Armed Forces began wearing keffiyeh for practical reasons. While the scarves were never issued by the American armed forces directly, many private tactical equipment retailers marketed and sold them to service personnel in the Marines and Army. The scarves were usually dyed into color schemes that closely matched the service uniforms, and bore symbols that appealed to Western consumers (e.g., skull and cross bones, Gadsden snakes, and Spartan helmets). Black and coyote-brown keffiyeh are still commonly worn by military veterans without any implied support for Arab nationalism or similar causes, and at times can carry the opposite message.

== Fashion trend ==
As with other articles of clothing worn in wartime, such as the T-shirt, fatigues and khaki pants, the keffiyeh has been seen as chic among non-Middle Easterners in the West. Keffiyehs became popular in the UK in the 1970s and then in the United States in the late 1980s at the start of the First Intifada, when bohemian girls and punks wore keffiyehs as scarves around their necks. In the early 2000s, keffiyehs were very popular among youths in Tokyo, who often wore them with camouflage clothing. The trend recurred in the mid-2000s in the United States, Europe, Canada and Australia, when the keffiyeh became popular as a fashion accessory, usually worn as a scarf around the neck in hipster circles. Stores such as Urban Outfitters and TopShop stocked the item. However, after some controversy over the retailer's decision to label the items "anti-war scarves", Urban Outfitters pulled it. In spring 2008, keffiyehs in colors such as purple and mauve were given away in issues of fashion magazines in Spain and France. In the UAE, males are inclining towards more Western headgear while women are developing preferences for dupatta—the traditional head cover of South Asia. The appropriation of the keffiyeh as a fashion statement by non-Middle Eastern wearers separate from its political and historical meaning has been the subject of controversy in recent years. While it is often worn as a symbol of solidarity with the Palestinian struggle, the fashion industry has disregarded its significance by using its pattern and style in day-to-day clothing design. For example, in 2016, Topshop released a romper suit with the Keffiyeh print, calling it a "scarf playsuit". This led to accusations of cultural appropriation and Topshop eventually pulled the item from their website.

== See also ==
- List of headgear
- Emamah, Arabian turban
- Gamcha, scarf from South Asia
- Khăn rằn, checkered shawl worn in Cambodia and Vietnam
- Krama, Cambodian scarf
- Litham, Arabian headdress
- Sudra, Jewish scarf
- Tagelmust, Berber scarf
- Tallit, Jewish shawl
- Turban, headdress worn in Central and Western Asia
