= Izaar =

Loose garment for lower body

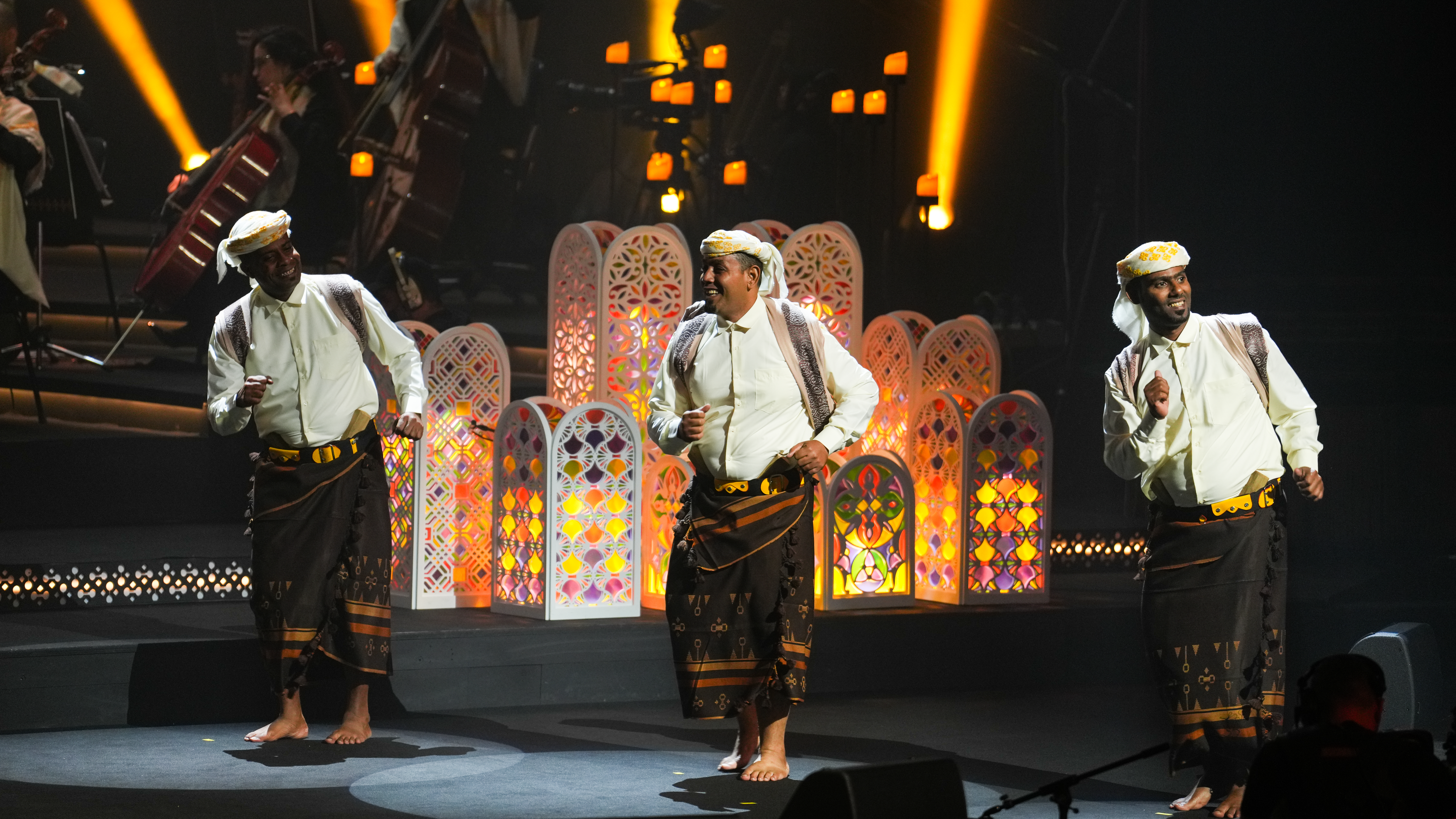
Yemeni men from Hadhramaut in Izaars

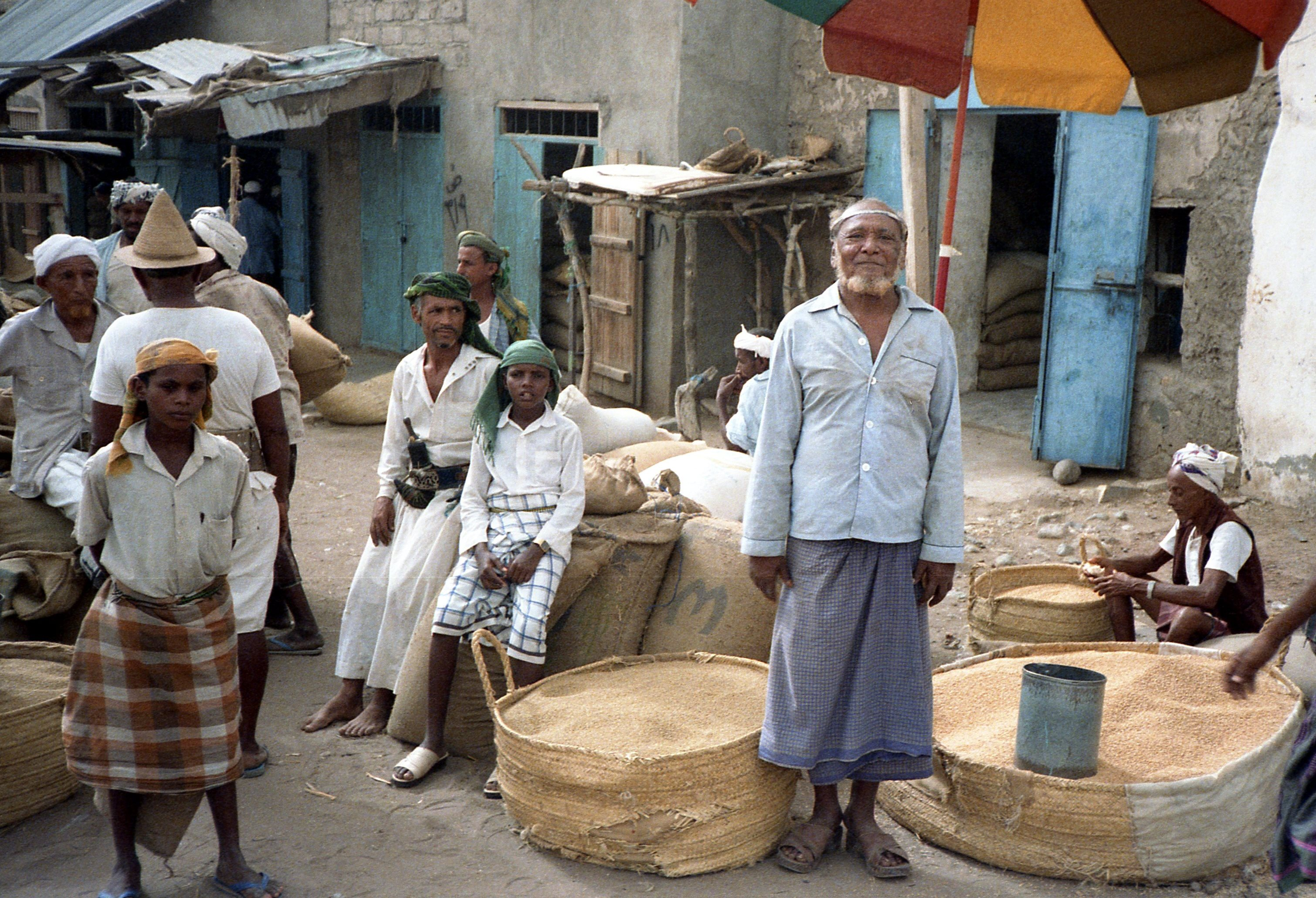
Yemeni Zaranig men in Izaars

An izaar, also izar or ʾizār (Arabic: إِزَار), also known as maʿawaz (مَعَوَز), futah (فُوطَة), wizar (وِزَار), maqtab (مَقْطَب) is a traditional lower garment that is frequently used by men in Somalia, Oman, United Arab Emirates and Yemen. Yemenis commonly wear izzars at home and work. It is also used by some in Iraq, Kuwait, Bahrain, Saudi Arabia and Qatar, and the Horn of Africa (Djibouti and Eritrea). A white izaar is typically worn underneath thawbs in Oman and the UAE instead of sirwal sunnah.

In the Indian subcontinent, the word izār in Hindustani colloquially referred to trousers or open drawers, thereby entering other Indian languages in different forms, like nijār in Madras Tamil, via Dakkani Urdu nizār.

== See also ==
- Dhoti
- Lungi
- Sarong
