= Kharqan District =

District in Markazi province, Iran

Kharqan District Persian: بخش خرقان
- District
- Location within Iran
- Coordinates: 35°22′N 49°53′E
- Country: Iran
- Province: Markazi
- County: Zarandiyeh
- Capital: Razeqan

Population (2016)
  - Total: 10,055
- Time zone: UTC+3:30 (IRST)

Kharqan District (Persian: بخش خرقان) is in Zarandiyeh County, Markazi province, Iran. Its capital is the city of Razeqan.

== Demographics ==
=== Population ===
At the time of the 2006 National Census, the district's population was 9,276 in 2,726 households. The following census in 2011 counted 7,809 people in 2,433 households. The 2016 census measured the population of the district as 10,055 inhabitants in 3,389 households.

=== Administrative divisions ===
Kharqan District Population
Administrative Divisions	2006	2011	2016
Alishar RD	2,349	2,093	1,969
Alvir RD	3,187	2,110	3,463
Duzaj RD	3,314	3,109	3,797
Razeqan (city)	426	497	826
Total	9,276	7,809	10,055
RD = Rural District
