= Khăn vấn =

Vietnamese turban was popular in the Nguyễn dynasty

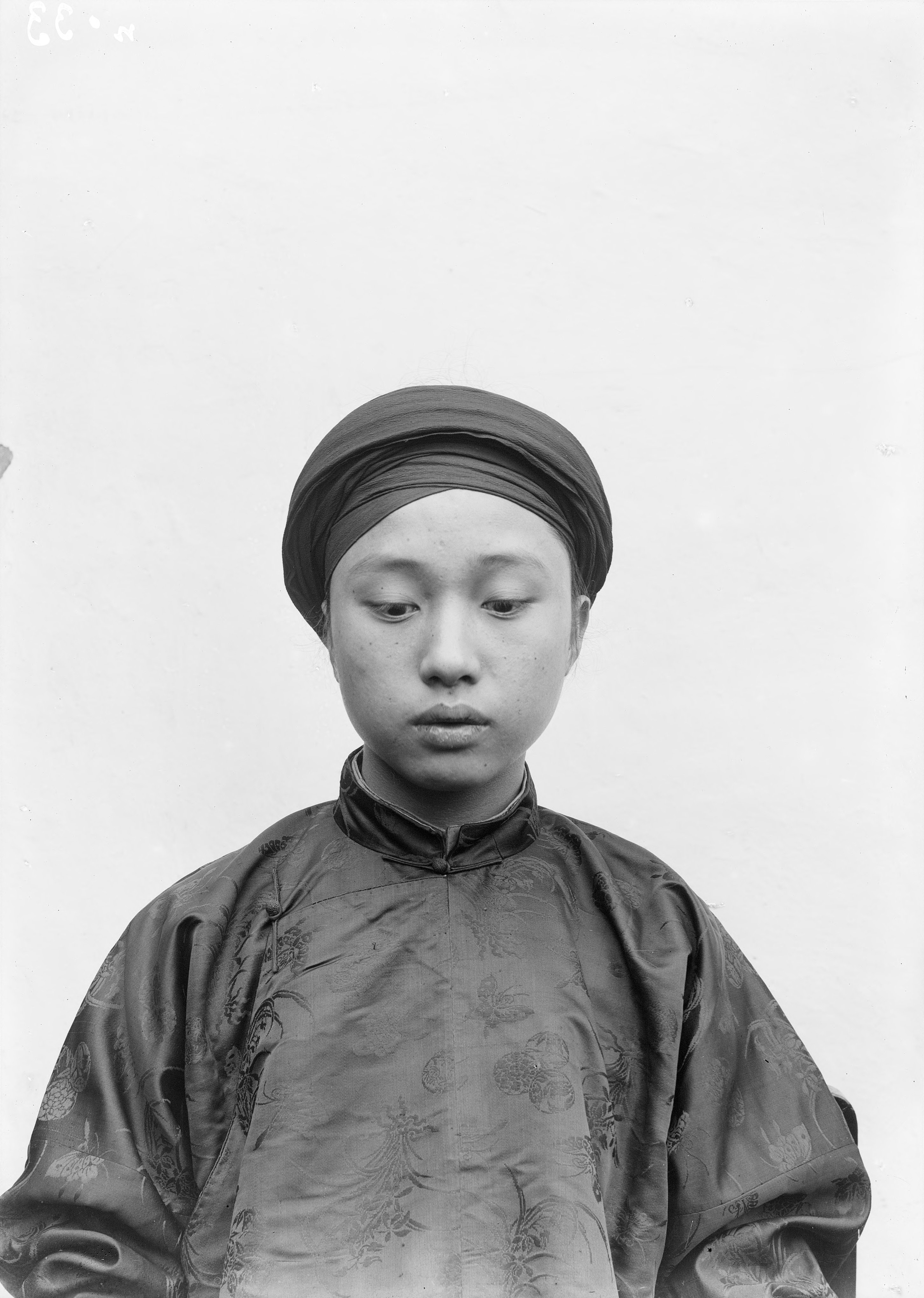
Vi Văn Định, a mandarin for the Nguyễn dynasty wearing a khăn vấn.

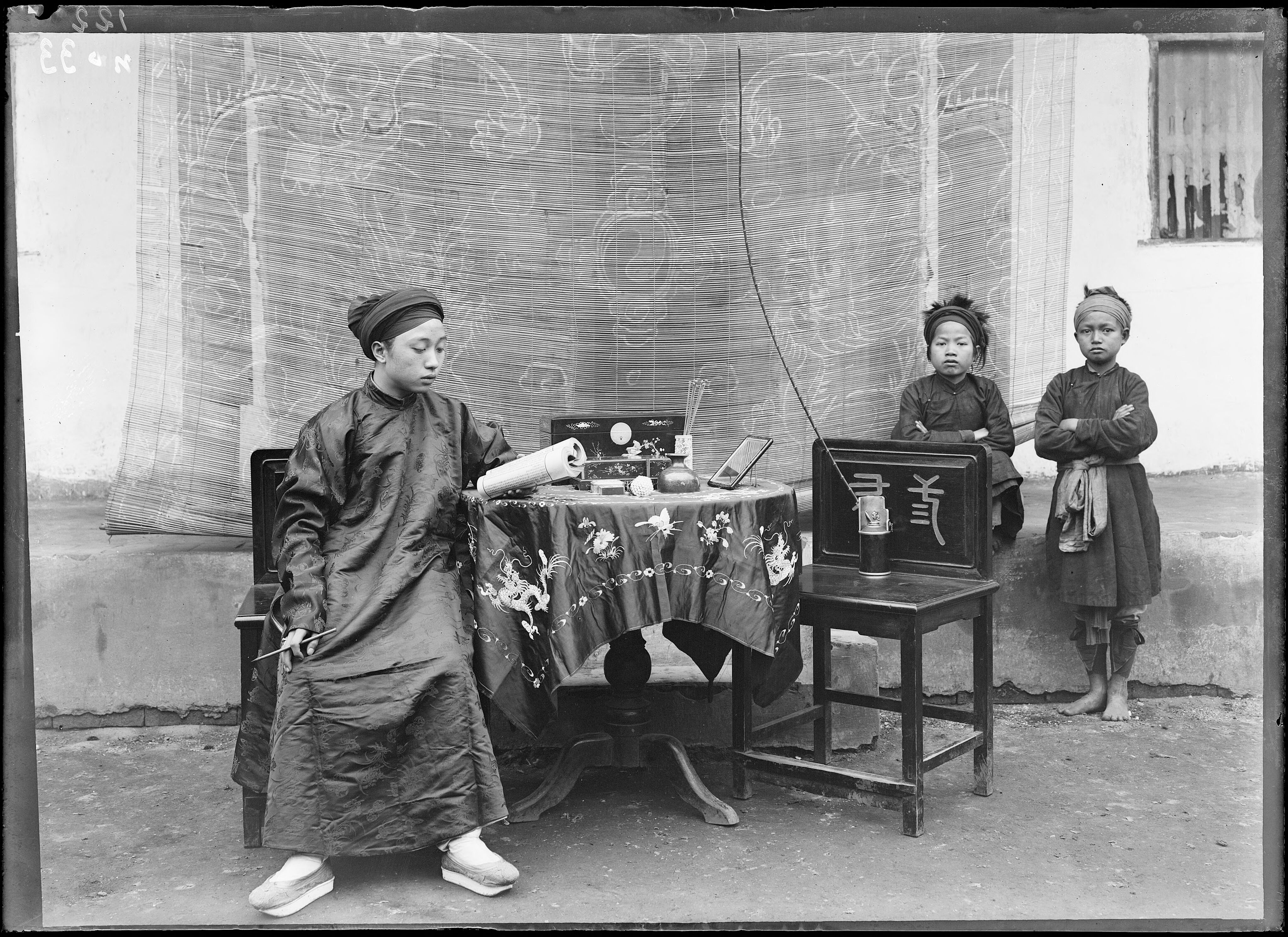
Vi Văn Định at home is seen wearing a khăn vấn.

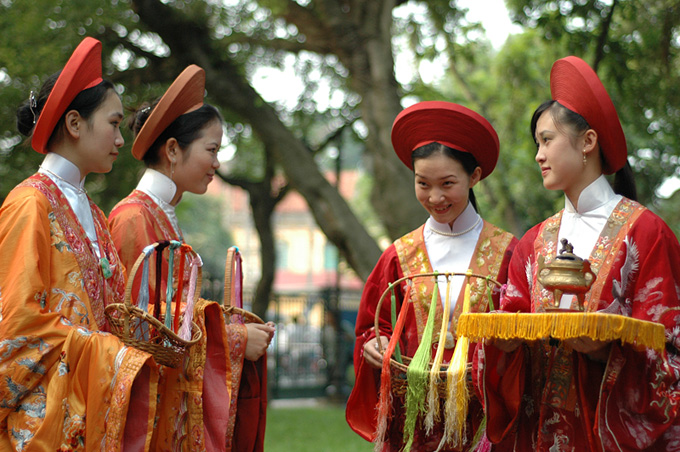
Vietnamese women wear a version of áo Nhật Bình with khăn vành dây.

Khăn Vấn (Chữ Nôm: 巾問), khăn đóng (Chữ Nôm: 巾㨂) or khăn xếp (Chữ Nôm: 巾插), is a kind of turban worn by Vietnamese people which became popular beginning with the reign of the Nguyễn lords. The word vấn means coil around. The word khăn means cloth, towel or scarf.

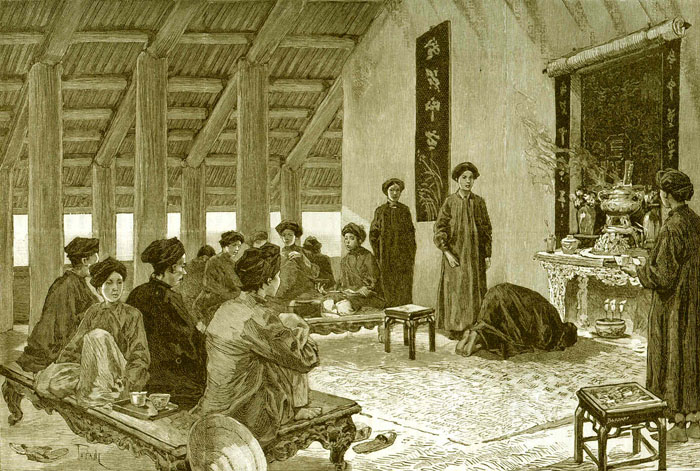
People in the Nguyễn dynasty with khăn vấn. The people in the back are sitting on a piece of traditional furniture known as a sập.

== History ==
During the Trịnh-Nguyễn war, the residents in Quảng Nam (Canglan – the Southern) began to adapt to some customs of Champa, one of those was "vấn khăn" – wrap the scarf around head.

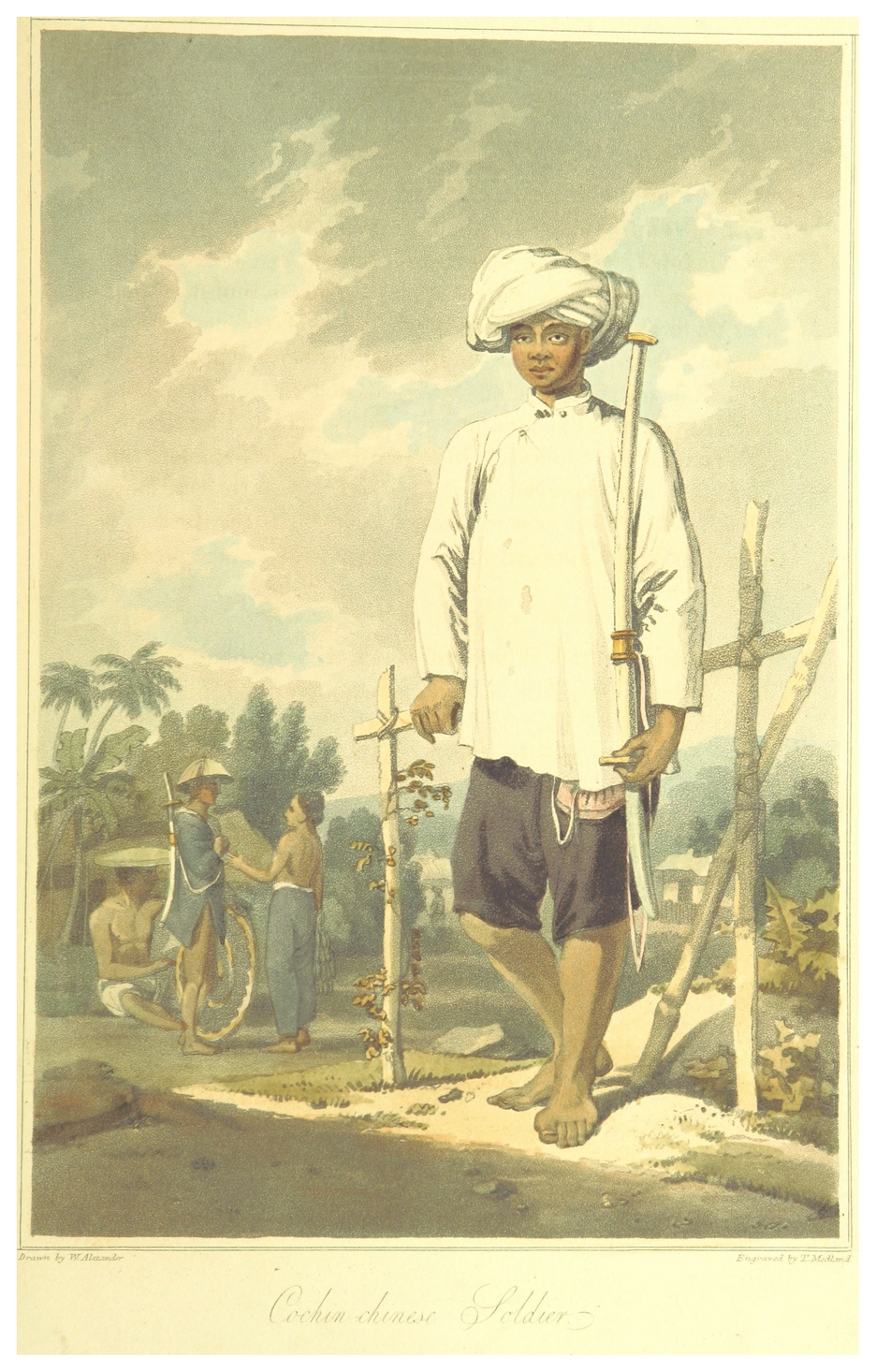
A man wearing Champa style turban.

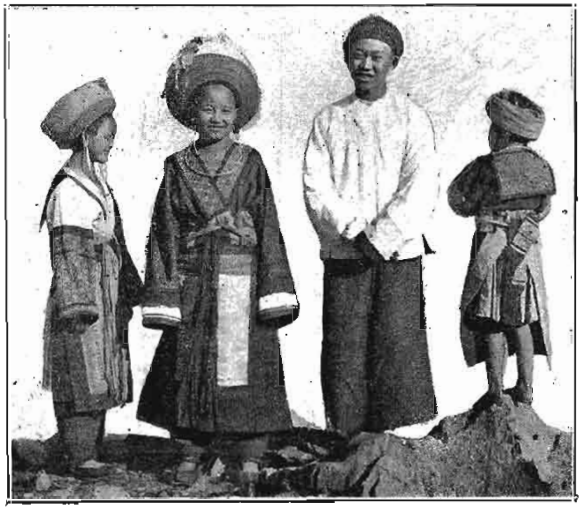
Hmong people in Northern Vietnam wearing their distinctive turbans

The Nguyen Lords introduced áo ngũ thân, the predecessor of the modern áo dài. In 1744, Lord Nguyễn Phúc Khoát of Đàng Trong (Huế) decreed that both men and women in his court wear trousers and a gown with buttons down the front. The members of the Đàng Trong court (southern court) were thus distinguished from the courtiers of the Trịnh Lords in Đàng Ngoài (Hanoi), who wore áo giao lĩnh with long skirts and loose long hair. Hence, wrapping scarf around head became a unique custom in the south. From 1830, Minh Mạng emperor mandated that every civilian in the country change their clothes and that custom became popular throughout Vietnam.

== Characteristics ==
Khăn vấn is a rectangular textile that is long and quite thick, wrapped tightly around the head. According to the decrees of Nguyễn dynasty written in the Historical chronicle of Đại Nam, the Vietnamese initially remained faithful to the Champa style, but gradually adapted styles to suit needs for each social class.

In addition, according to the law of Nguyễn dynasty, the problem of being too short and thin was prohibited, but too long and thick was also criticized as ugly.

== Types ==
There are many types of khăn vấn, but they are basically classified into three types:

=== Khăn vấn for males ===
Khăn vấn for men, handy and casual. A thick or thin cloth is used (as one would like to fix a bun) and is wrapped once or twice around the head for a neat fit, except for yellow (that of the emperor).

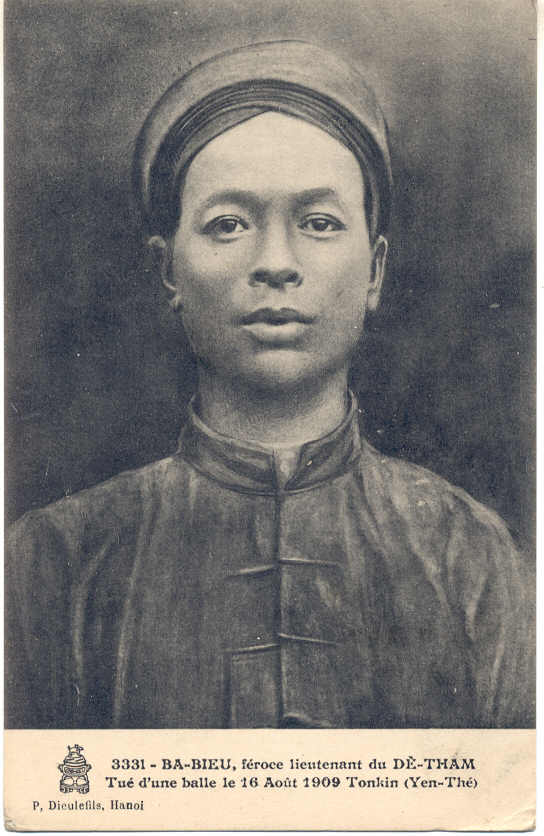
Ba Biêu, a Đề Thám lieutenant wearing khăn vấn chữ nhân (人 shaped) with seven turns of coil.

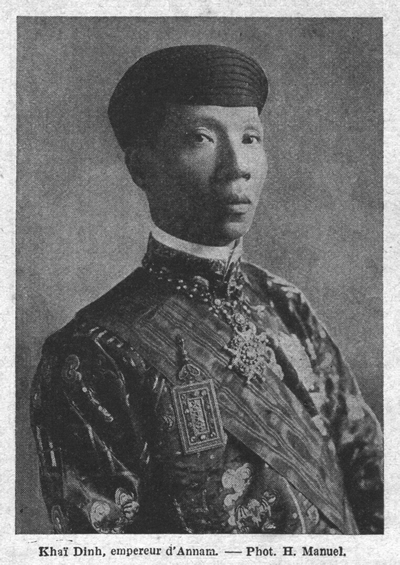
Khải Định wearing khăn vấn chữ nhất (一 shaped) with seven turns of coil.

There are two most popular styles for wearing khăn vấn for male: shaped chữ nhân (looks like 人) and chữ nhất (looks like 一).

- Chữ nhân style: the pleats on the forehead look like the word "nhân" (人 shaped)
- Chữ nhất style: the pleats on the forehead like the word "nhất" (一 shaped)

=== Khăn vấn for females ===
Khăn vấn for women and girls, also called khăn rí or khăn lương (can also be written as khăn lươn). A piece of cloth that is not too long is wrapped with padded hair inside. Then, it is wrapped around the head to keep the hair neat. Young women when going to the festival also prefer to wear a ponytail for increased charm. Except for yellow (for royal family members) and pink (for singers and prostitutes), other colours are popular.

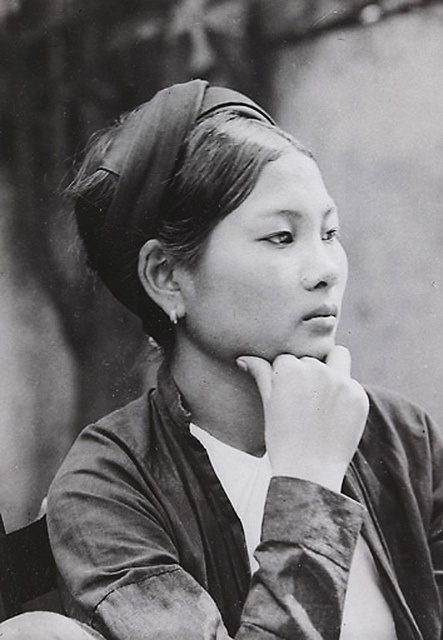
A Tonkin woman was wearing khăn vấn in Northern style.

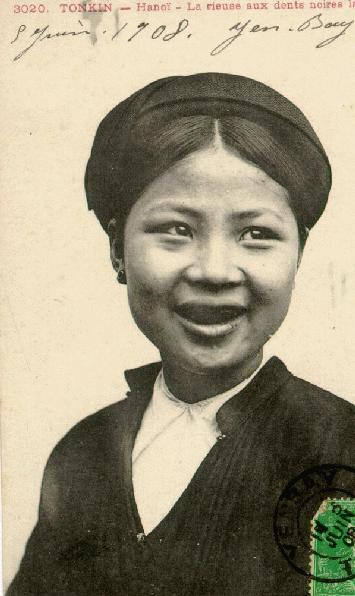
A Tonkin woman with blackened teeth wearing khăn vấn in Northern style.

A style of wearing a khăn vành in the Huế is different from the style seen in Northern Vietnam. Huế khăn vành is worn with the edge of the khăn vành facing upwards inside the ring. The second ring is attached to the outside of the first, rather than under the ring as in the North.

=== Khăn vành dây (formal for females) ===
A style of khăn vấn for females, used mainly by nobilities and imperial members on formal occasions, is khăn vành dây, khăn vành or mũ mấn. The very long, thick cloth is wrapped around the head like a funnel. The traditional khăn vành dây is recorded in a dark blue color. Only on the most important occasions did one see a yellow khăn vành dây in the inner part of the Imperial City of Huế. In addition, from the empress mother, the empress and the princesses also only wore the dark blue khăn vành dây.

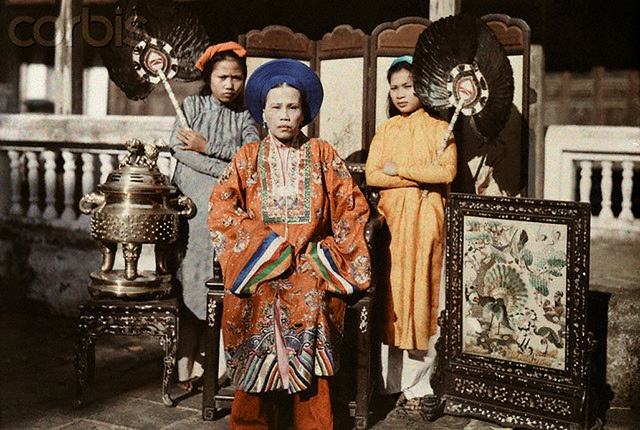
Princess Mỹ Lương was wearing dark blue khăn vành dây with red áo Nhật Bình.

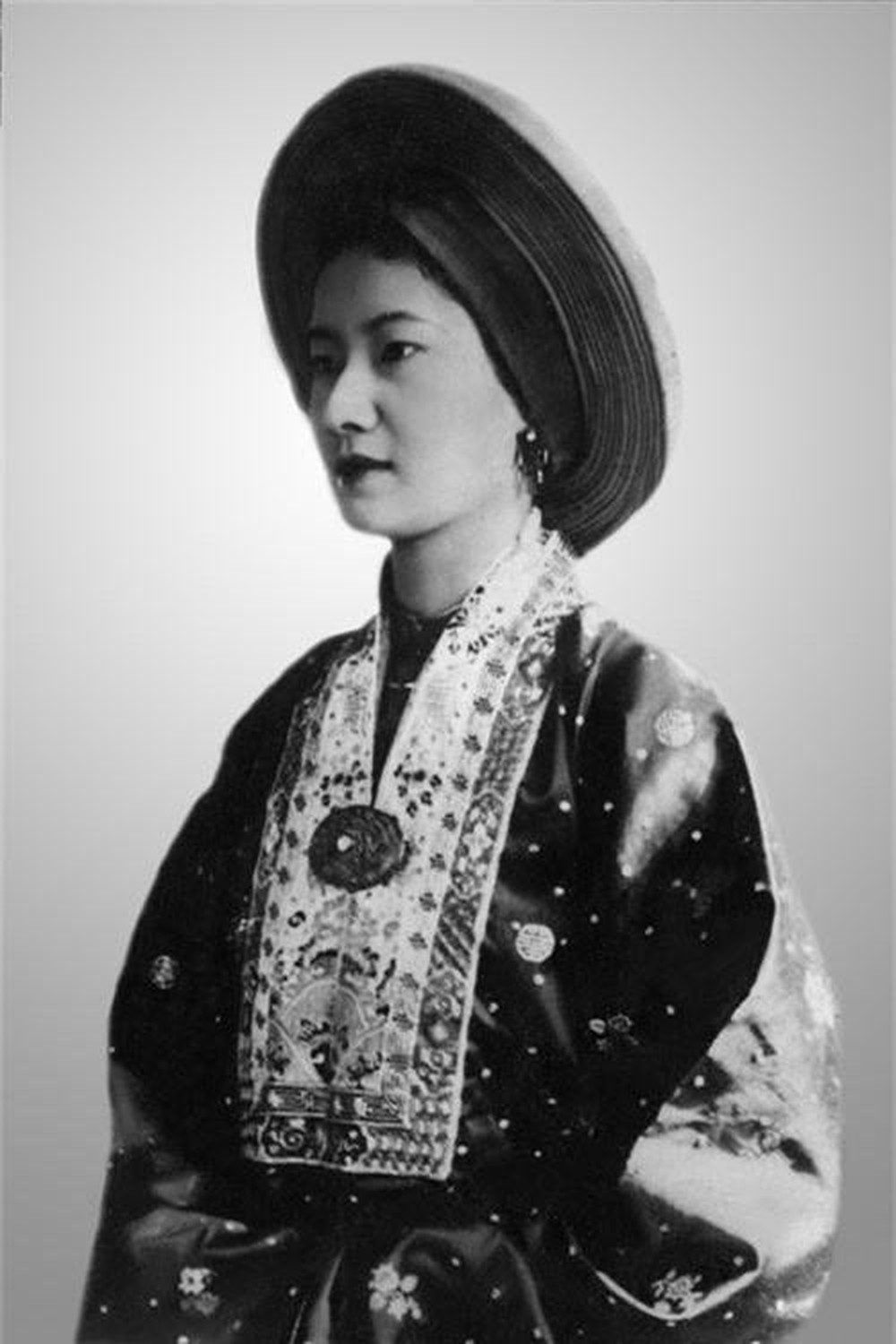
Nam Phương empress was wearing khăn vành dây with áo Nhật Bình.

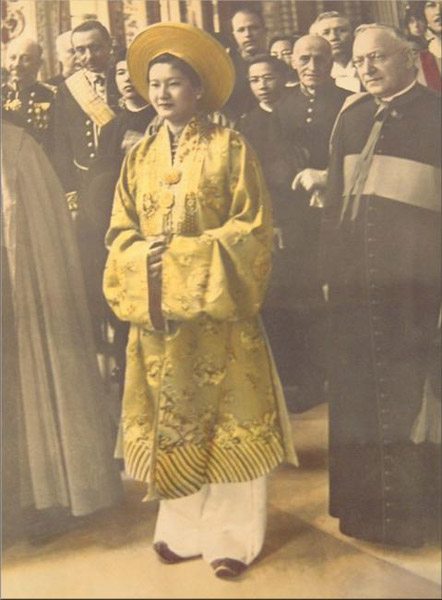
Nam Phương empress was wearing yellow khăn vành dây with áo Nhật Bình during Vatican's trip.

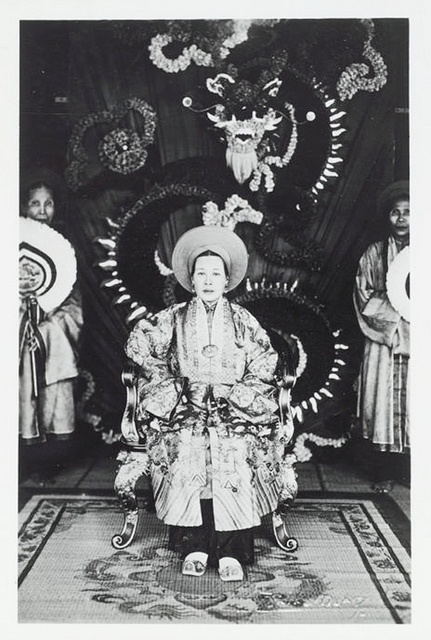
Empress dowager Từ Cung in áo Nhật Bình and khăn vành.

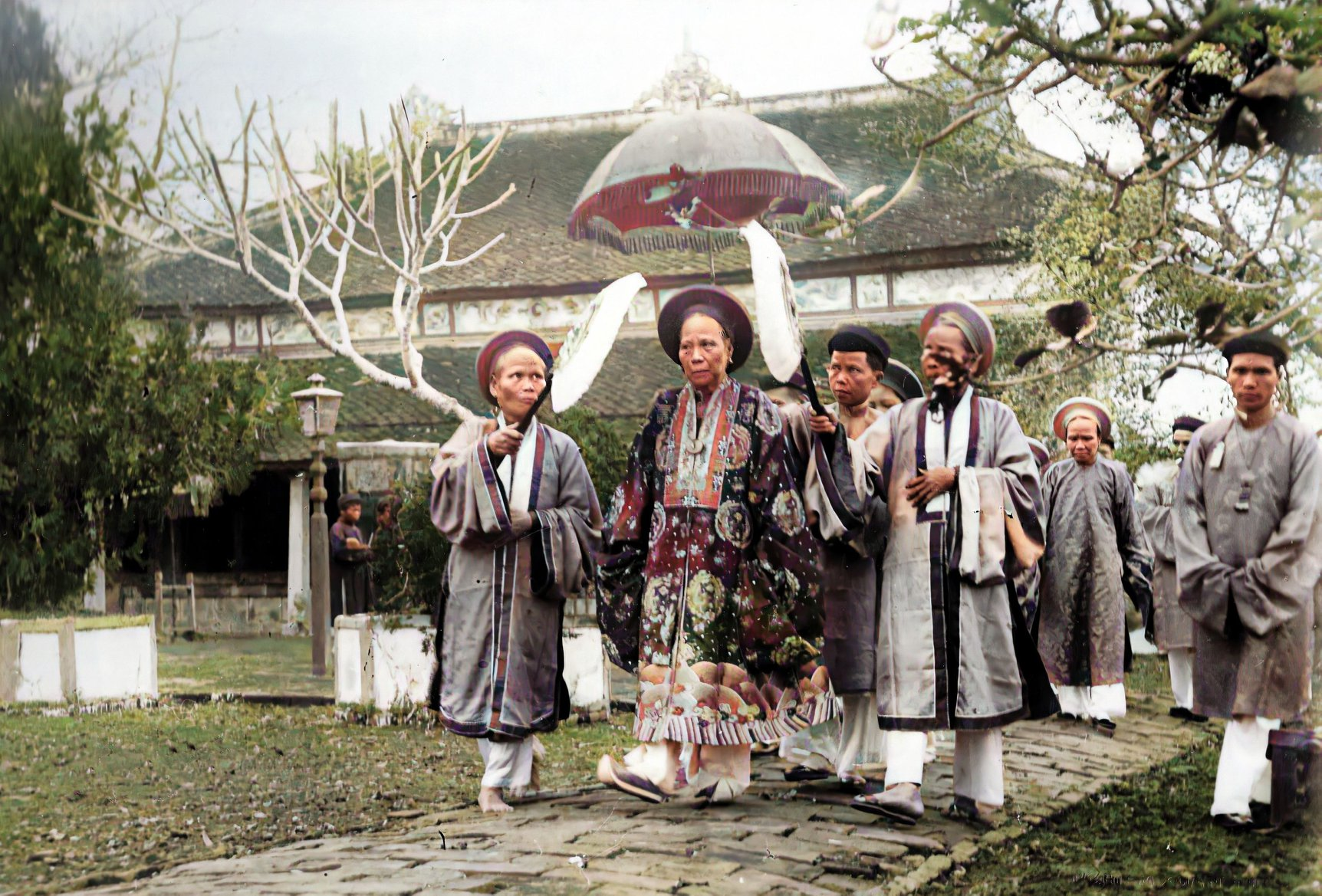
Grand empress dowager Dương Thị Thục, grandmother of emperor Bảo Đại in Imperial costume.

In the old days inner Imperial City of Huế, phấn nụ (face powder made from flower mirabilis jalapa) and khăn vành went together. They use the nhiễu cát textile or Crêpe de Chine in the later period to cover their hair. The nhiễu cát textile, woven by Japanese in the past, was only half as thin as the Crêpe de Chine, which was used in the Imperial City at the end of the Nguyễn dynasty. The ladies in Hue Palace often wore khăn vành dây at the ceremonies. A khăn vành dây made of the imported textile crêpe de Chine is 30 cm wide, has an average length 13 m. A khăn vành dây made of Vietnamese nhiễu cát textile is nearly double the length.

From the original width of 30 cm, the khăn vành dây is folded into a width of 6 cm with the open edge turn upward. Then, it is wrapped around the head in the shape chữ nhân, which means the pleats on the forehead look like the word "nhân" (人 shaped), covering the hair at the shoulder and folding the scarf inside. Half the width of the scarf is folded, starting at the nape, leaving the open edge facing up before continuing. The khăn vành is tightly wrapped around the head and forms a large dish shape. Using nhiễu cát, the textile has high elasticity and roughness and the khăn vành rarely slips. The end of the scarf is carefully tucked into the back of the scarf, but sometimes pins are used for convenience.

== Variants ==
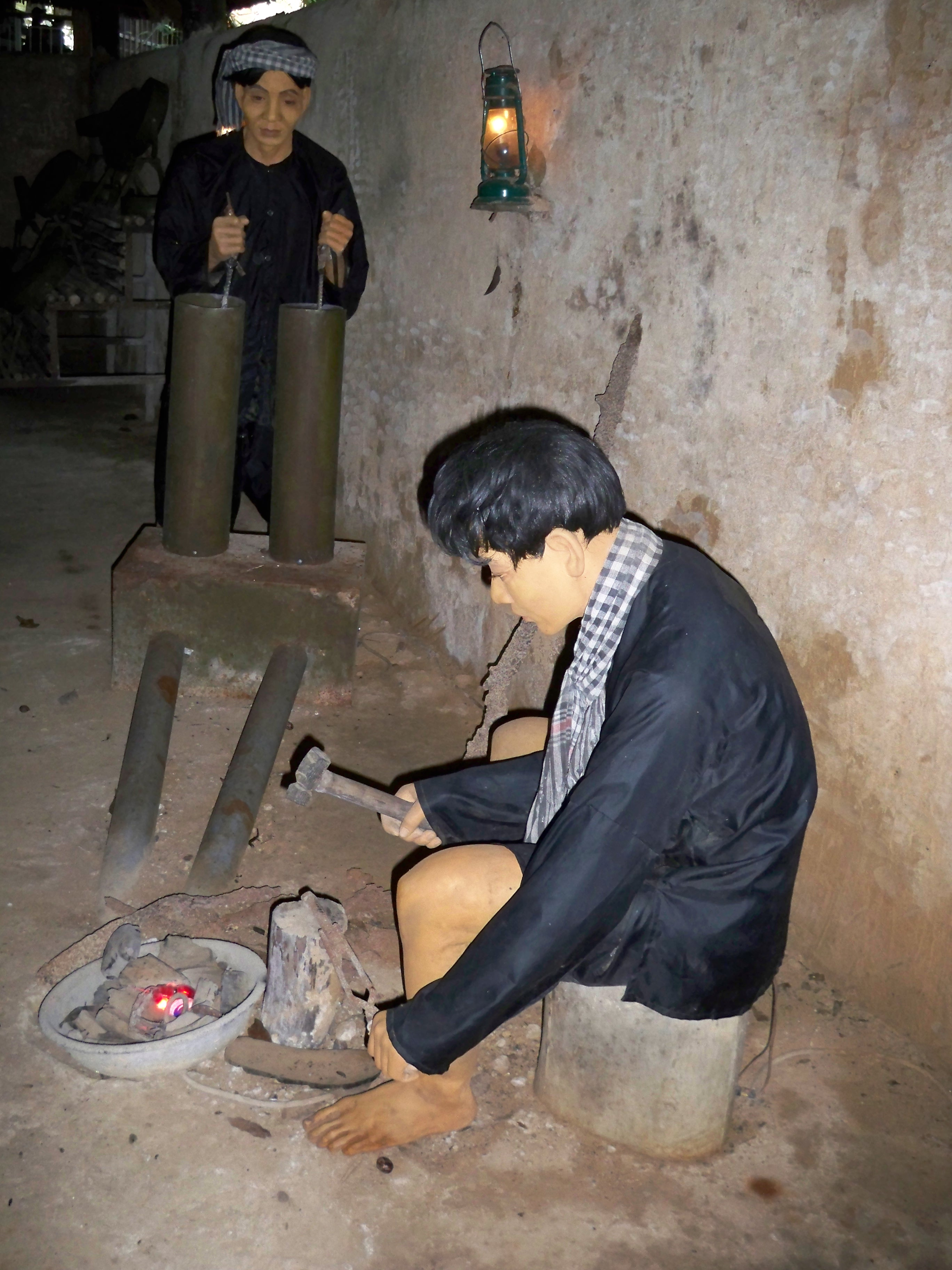
Statue of 2 Vietcong soldiers in Củ Chi tunnels wearing khăn rằn

In the Mekong Delta region, there is a popular variant called khăn rằn, which combines the traditional khăn vấn of the Vietnamese with the Krama of the Khmer. But unlike the red color of the Khmer, Vietnamese towels are black and white. Towels are usually 1m by 40–50 cm. Because it is only popular in the South, it is temporarily considered a characteristic of this place.

In the 21st century, many types of fake khăn vấn and mũ mấn were created, such as the mũ mấn made of wood, plastic, and metal. However, those were often criticized in the press as harsh and even disgusting. Therefore, the desire of having a neat and beautiful towel is considered a general trend in evaluating the quality of each person.

== Gallery ==
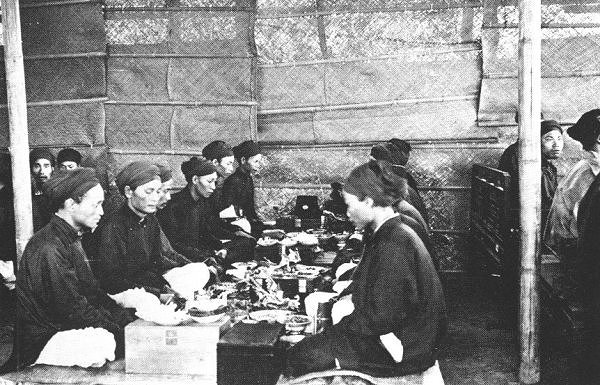
Confucian graduates wearing turbans receive Emperor's feast

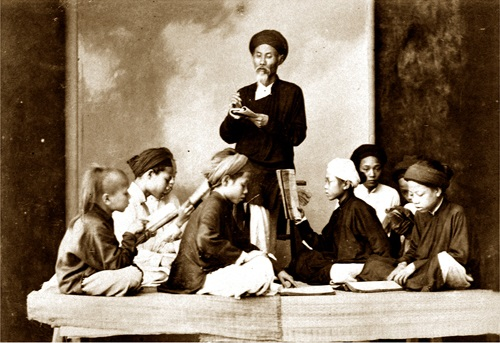
A private class at home in Vietnam about 1895. Picture depicts children and teacher wearing turbans.

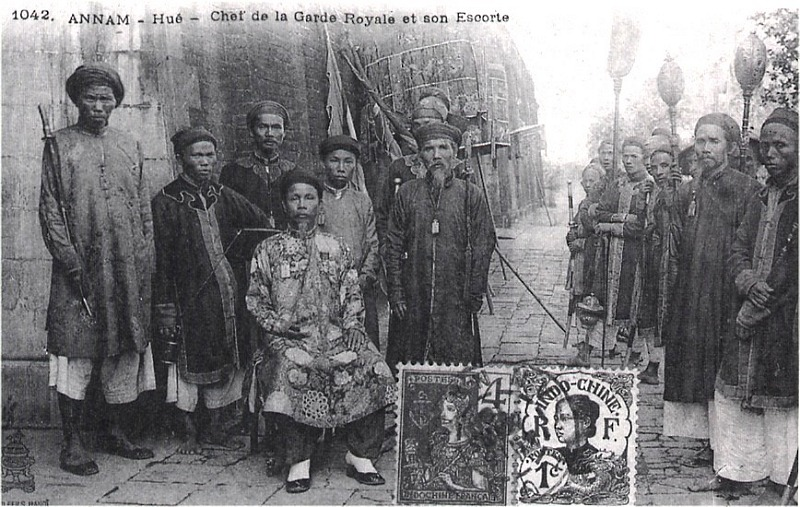
The Royal guard of the Nguyễn dynasty wearing turbans.

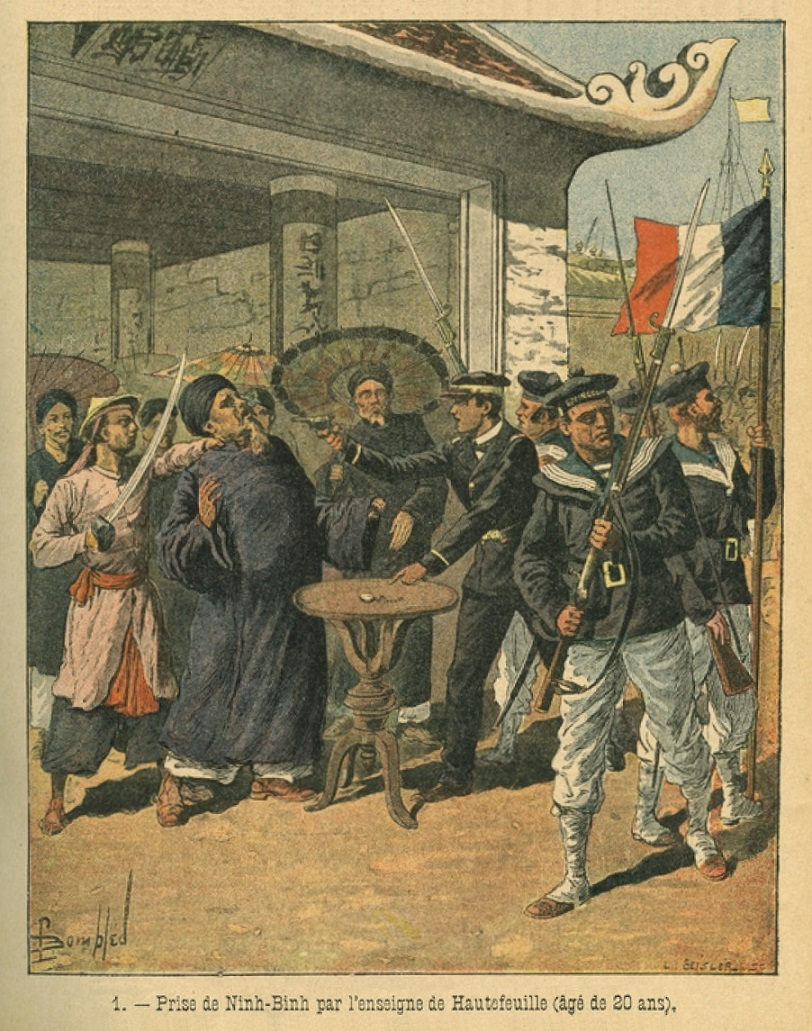
Capture of Ninh Binh by Hautefeuille. Picture depicts a mandarin official wearing a turban.

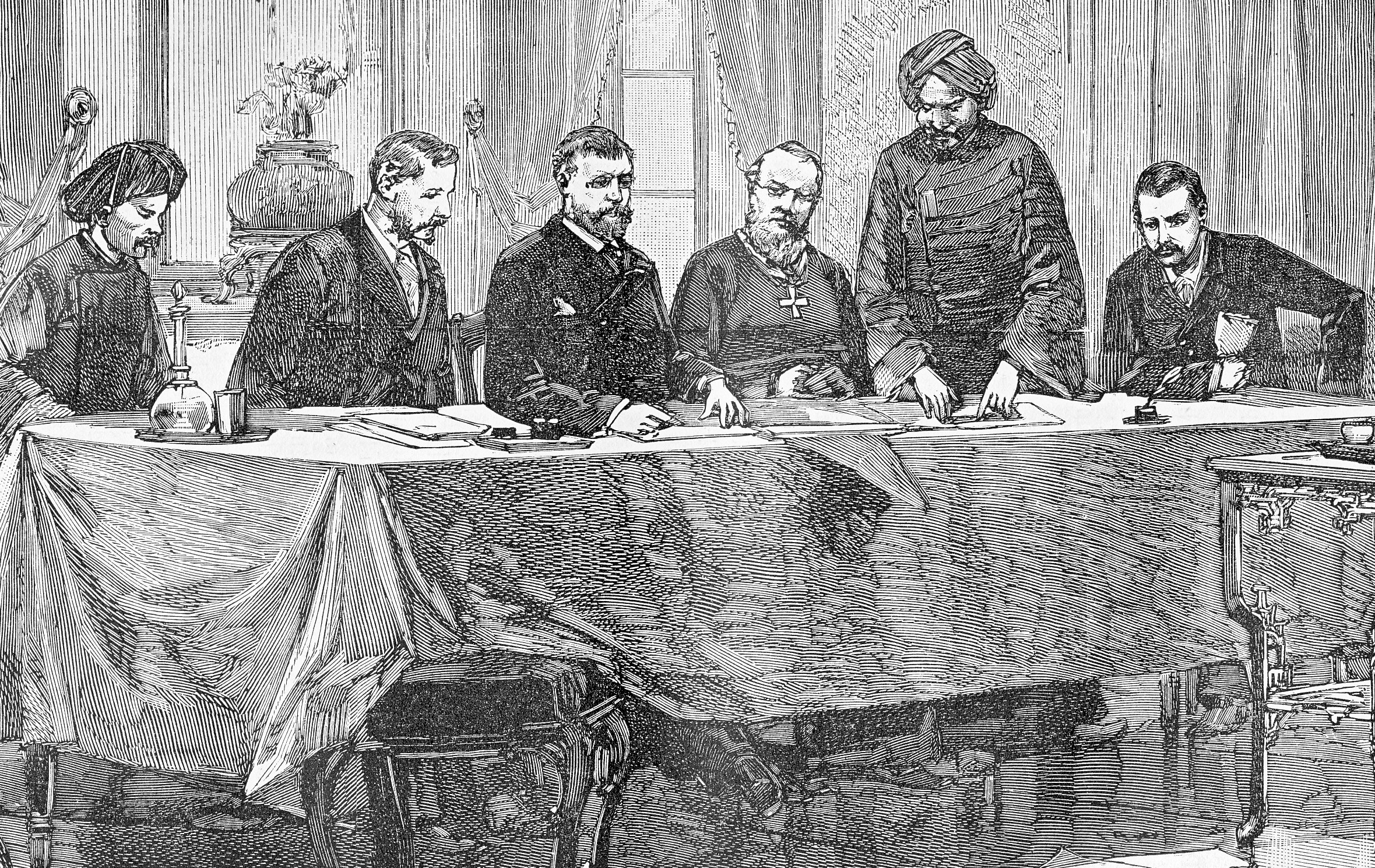
The Signing of the Treaty of Hue (1883) depicts French and Vietnamese officials.

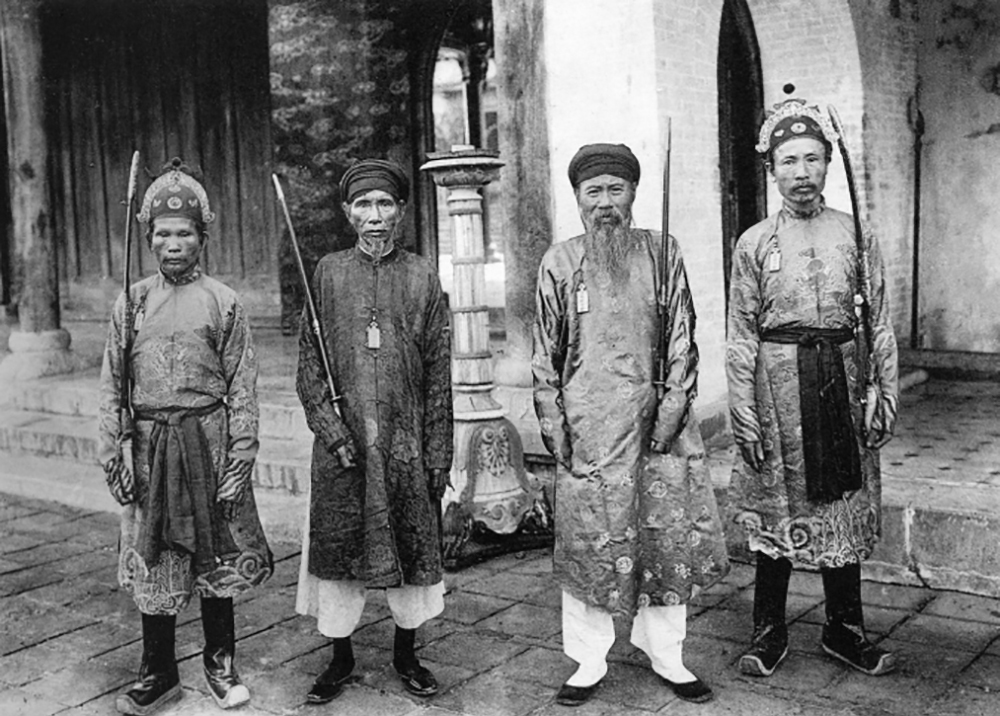
Officials of the Nguyen Dynasty in the 19th century wearing turbans in Hue Imperial Citadel.

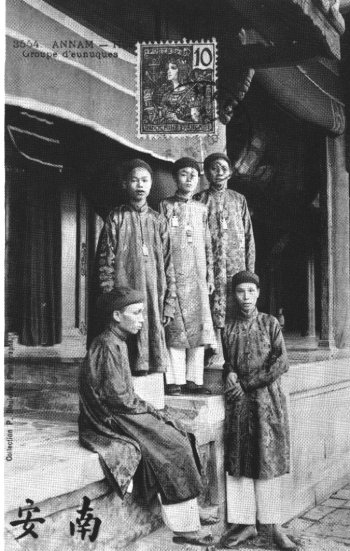
Eunuchs wearing turbans.

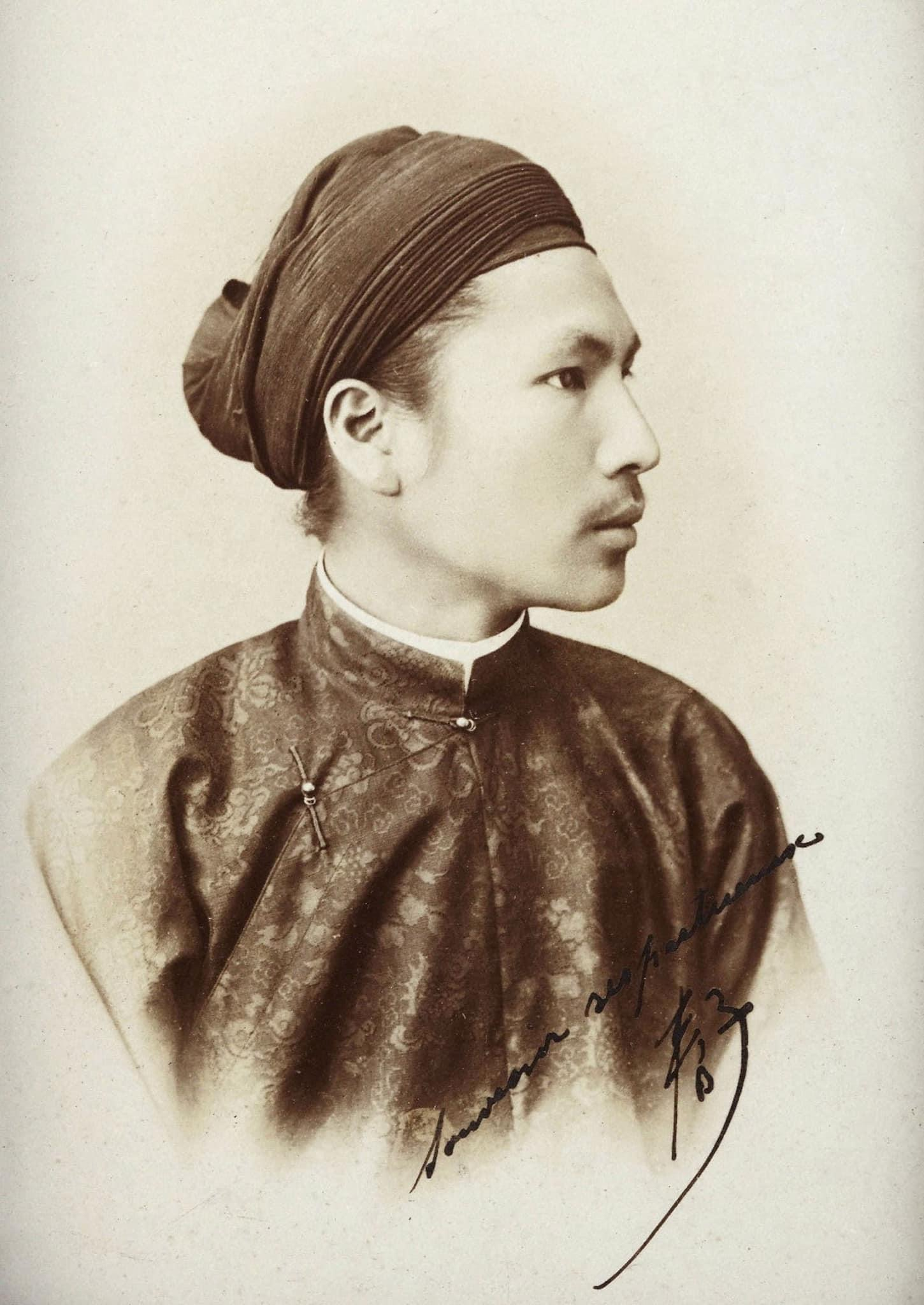
Emperor Hàm Nghi wearing a turban

== See also ==
- Dastar
- Head tie
- Pagri (turban)
- Turban
- Vietnamese clothing
