= Khăn rằn =

Traditional Vietnamese shawl

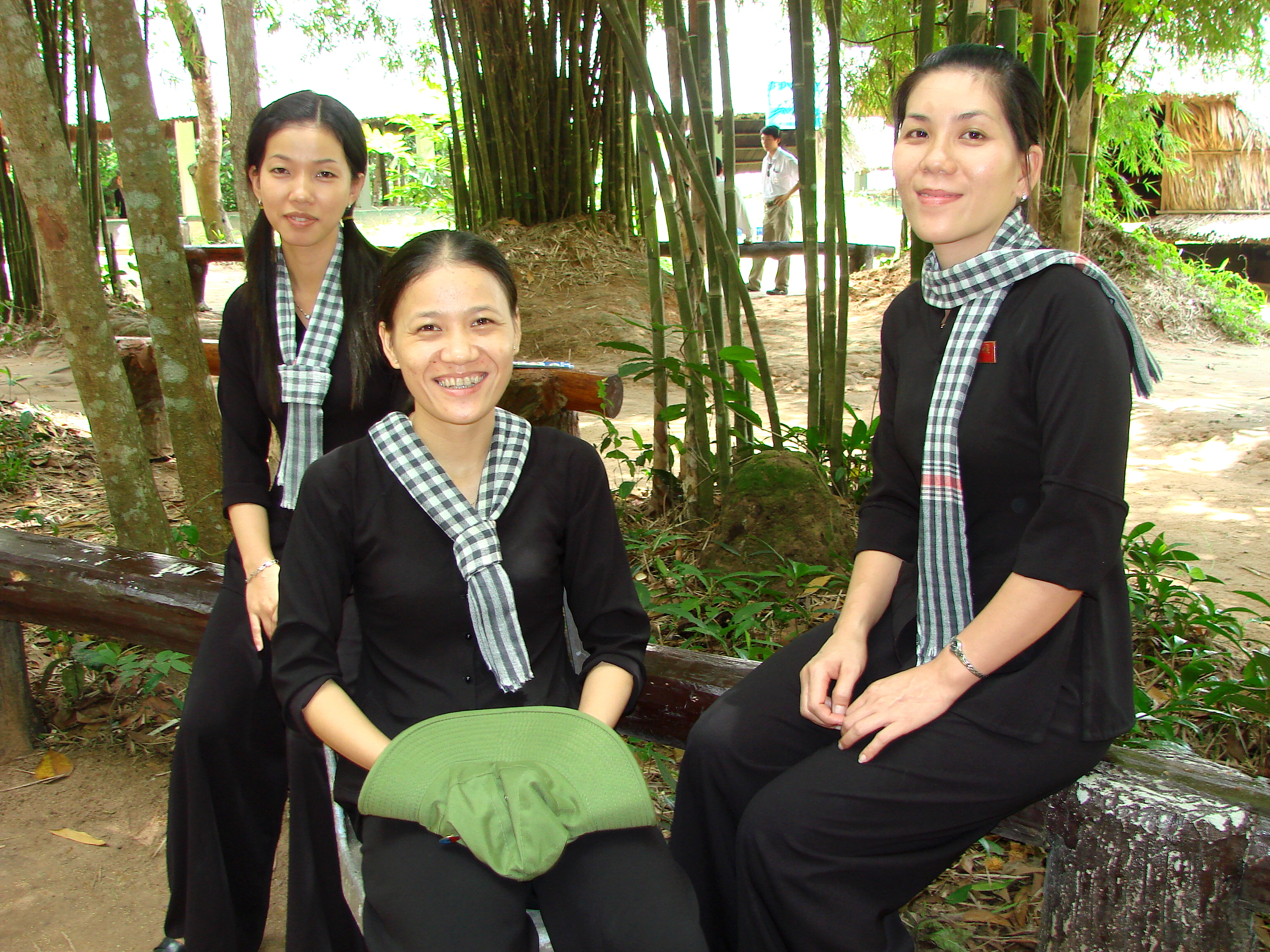
A museum exhibition shows women wearing the black-and-white checkered khăn rằn scarf, knotted or draped, and black Áo bà ba tunic

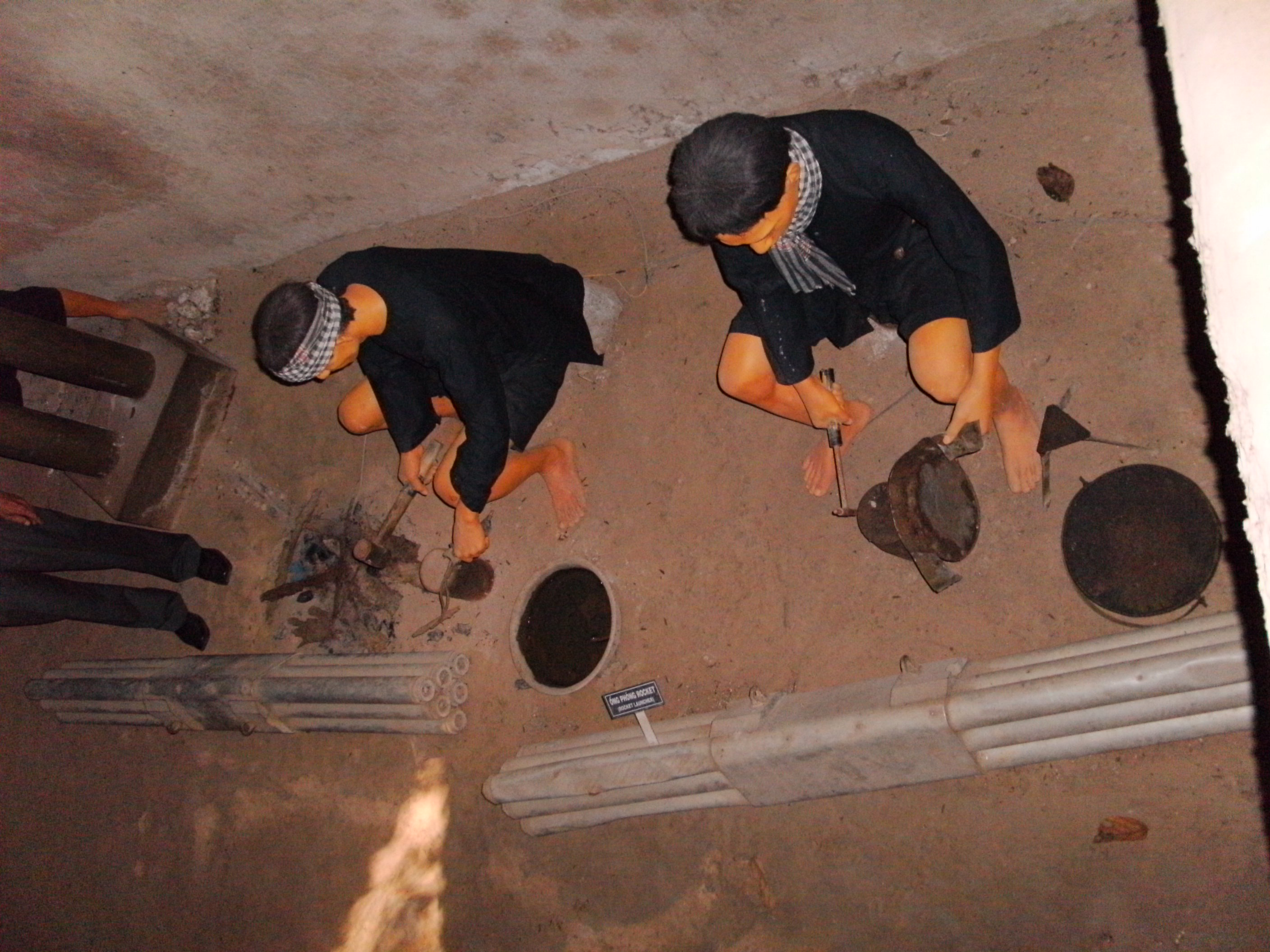
Khăn rằn can be worn around the head or the neck.

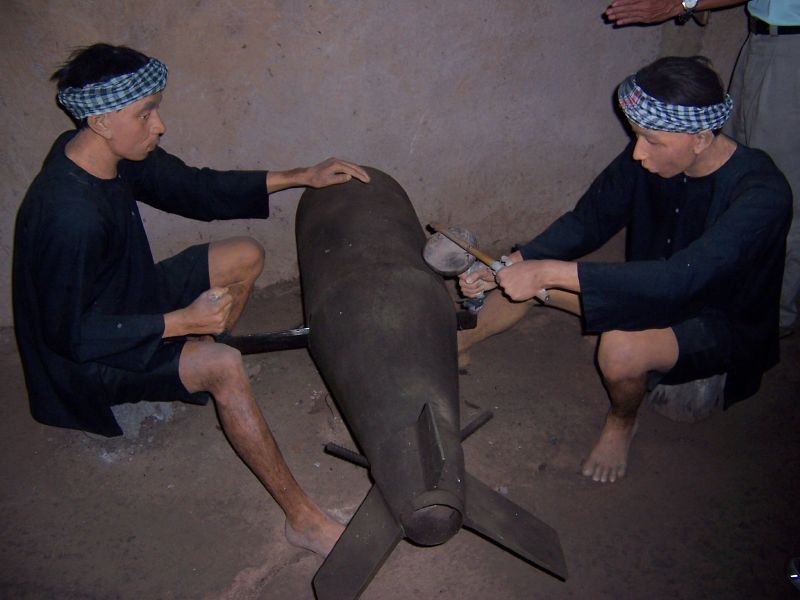
Củ Chi Tunnels exhibit showing Viet Cong members wearing khăn rằn as headbands

The khăn rằn (Vietnamese: khăn, "towel, scarf" + rằn "striped"; Chữ Nôm: 䘜吝) is a traditional Vietnamese checkered black-and-white scarf adapted from the Cambodian krama. It is traditionally worn in the region of the Mekong Delta in southern Vietnam.

During the Vietnam War, the distinctive scarf was donned by National Liberation Front soldiers to identify themselves.

== See also ==
- Khăn vấn
- Krama
