= Sập =

Vietnamese traditional furniture

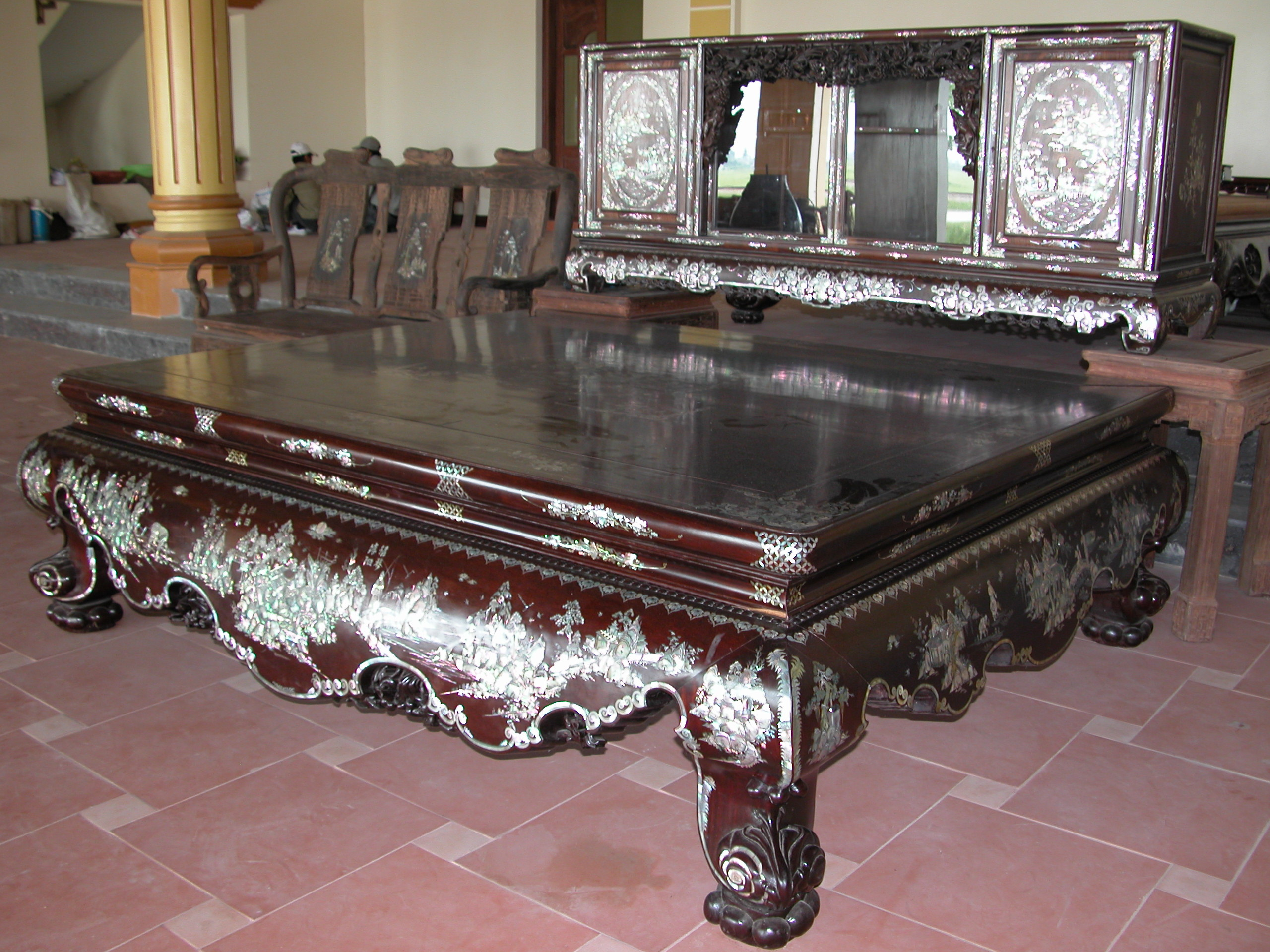
- A sập that has been decorated with the khảm xà cừ technique.
- Vietnamese alphabet: sập sập gỗ sập gụ
- Chữ Nôm: 𠙅 / 𥩰 𠙅楛 𠙅𣛡

A sập is a type of traditional furniture used in Vietnam.

== Background ==
A sập is a low ornate platform that is often made out of wood. Some sập are decorated with lacquering technique known as khảm xà cừ (chữ Nôm: 坎𤥭璖). The platform has four stumped legs that support the main structure of the sập. The furniture is used as a place to sit or lay down. A mat is sometimes laid down for more comfort or during family meals on it. Its elevated design helps to keep the sleeper off the ground, providing protection from pests and moisture. The sập holds cultural significance as a traditional piece of furniture commonly found in households. It reflects the country's agrarian heritage and traditional way of life, where wooden furniture was often handmade and passed down through generations.

High-quality sập are highly valued in Vietnam. Nguyễn Văn Thưởng, an owner of a market, owns a sập valued to be around 1.5 billion đồng (approximately 61,783 dollars). The sập was made of high-quality wood and was decorated with an elaborate design that includes the Four Holy Beasts.

== Gallery ==
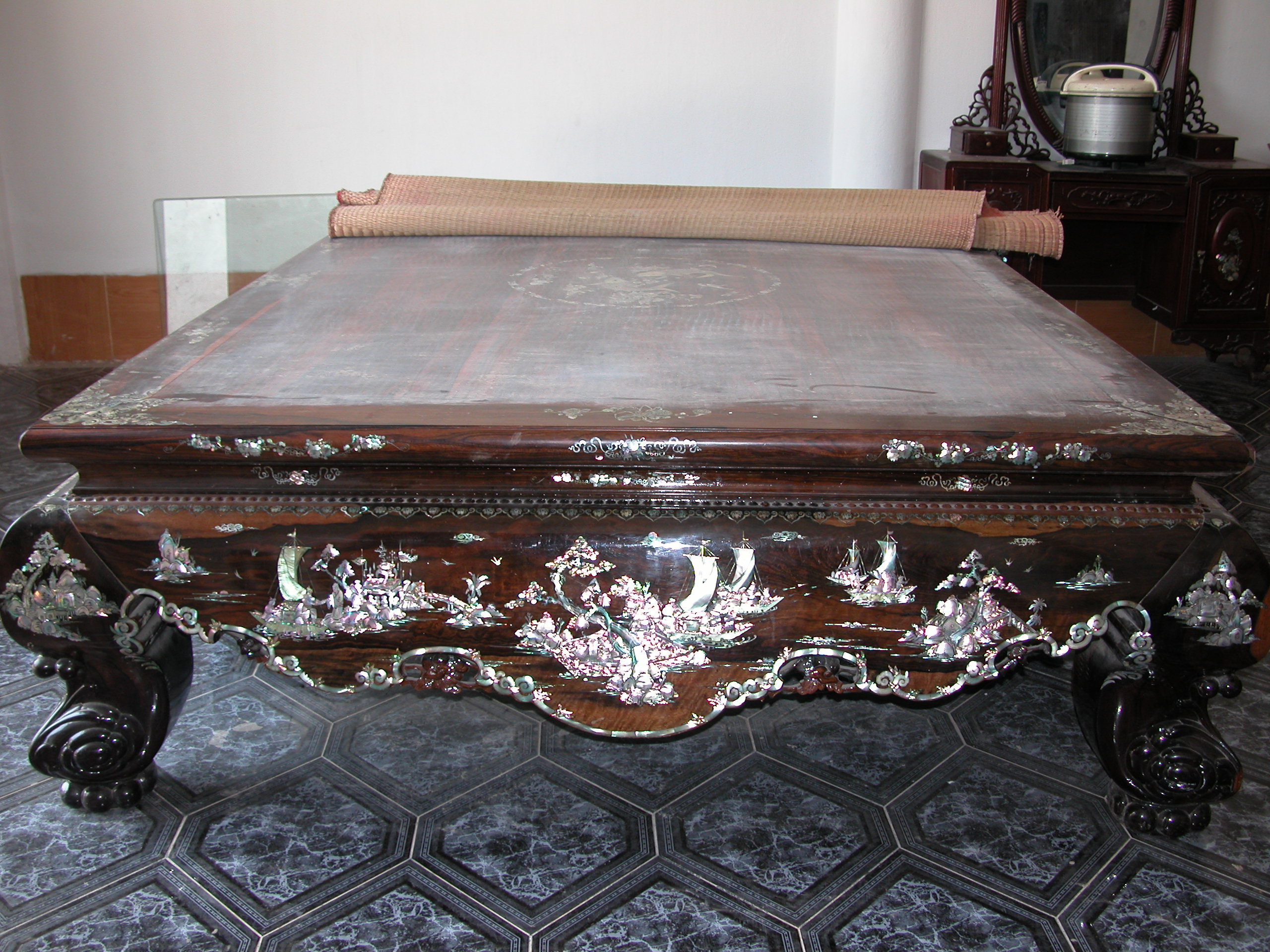
An orate sập with a mat on top of it in La Xuyên, Nam Định.

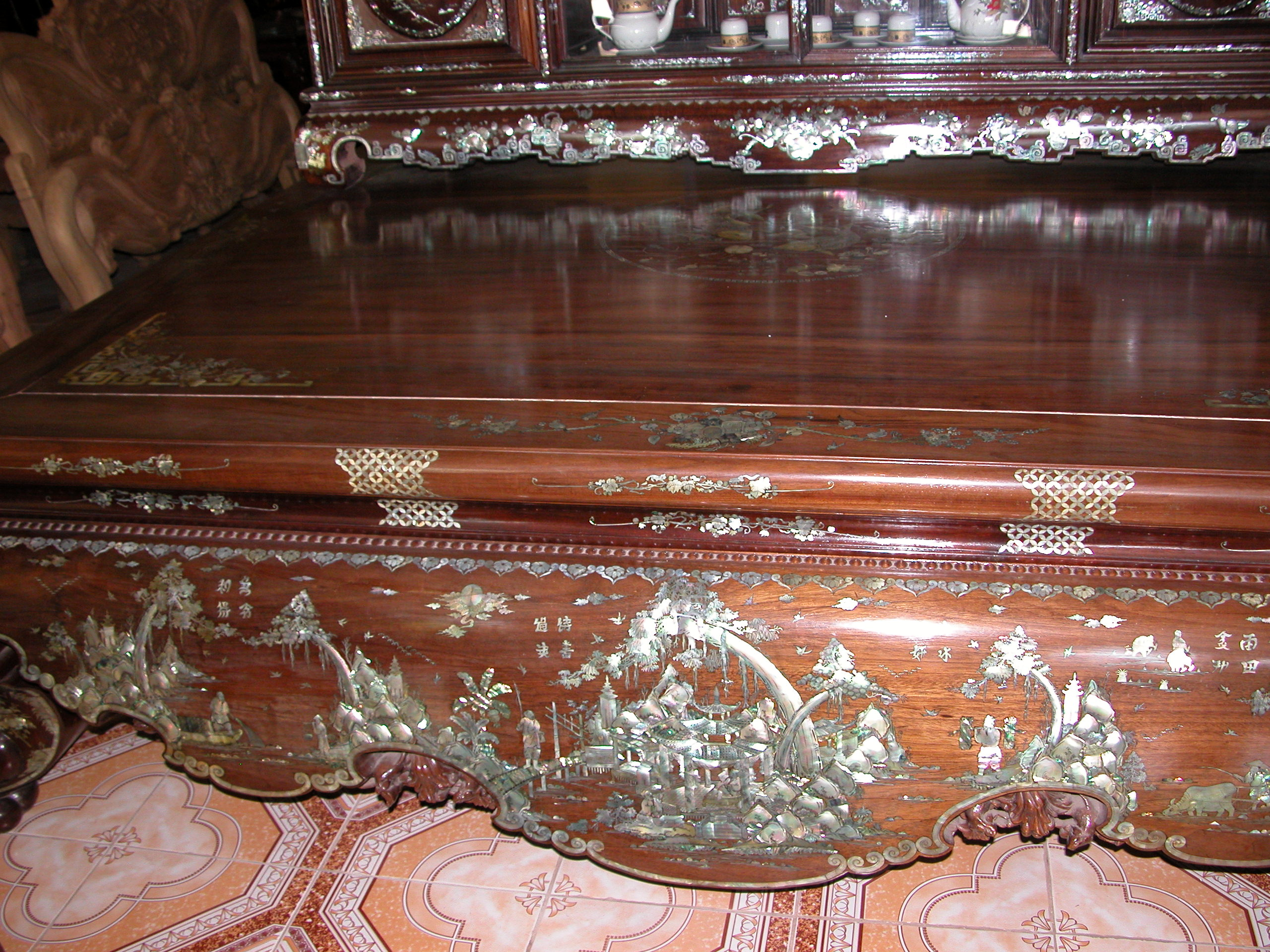
A sập khảm xà cừ with motifs of trees and its surroundings.

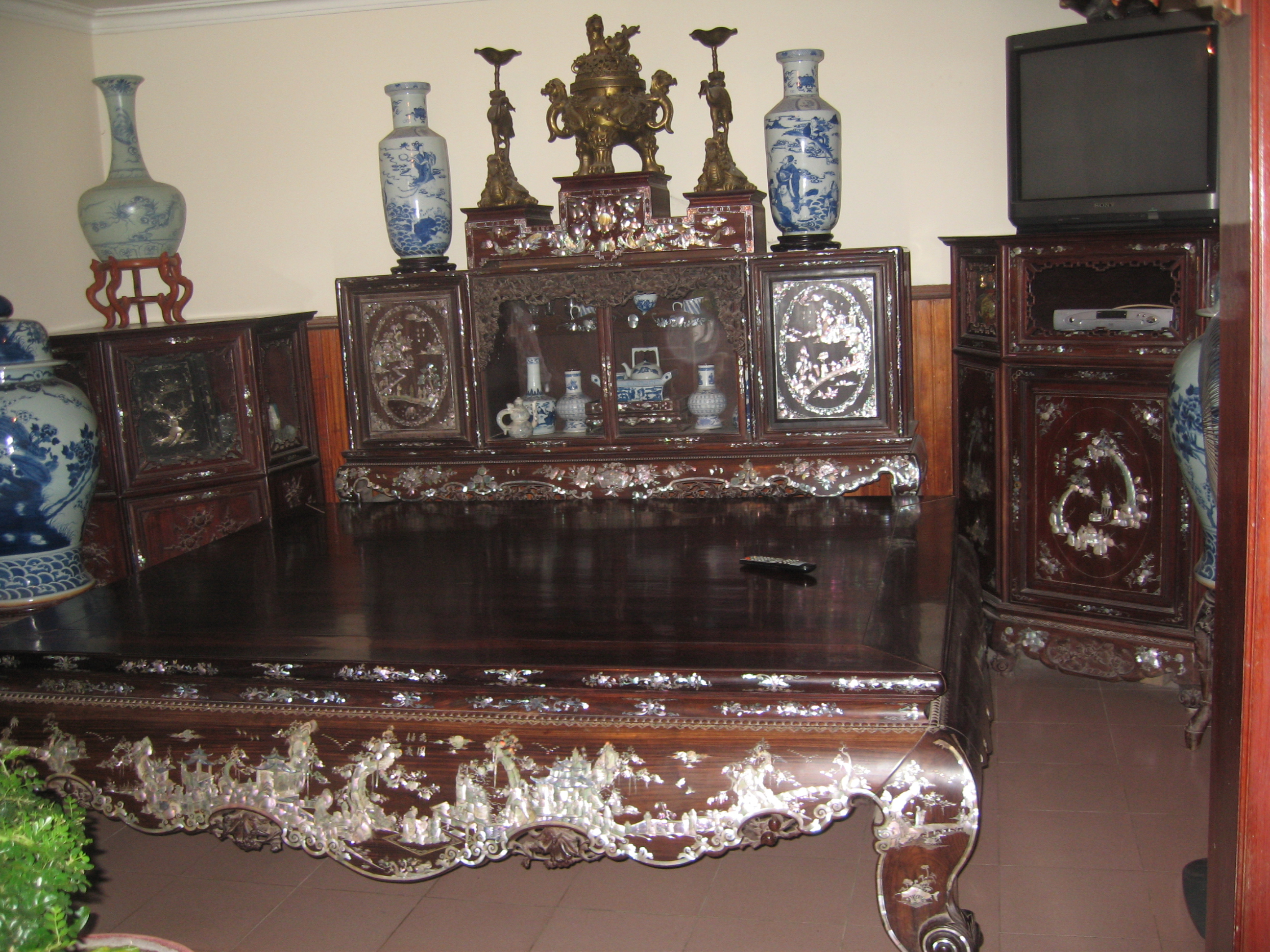
A sập with a lacquered cabinet.

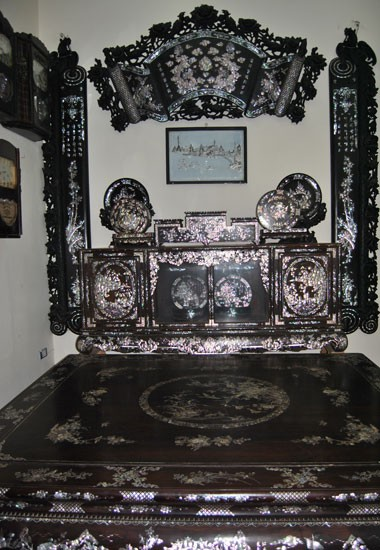
A sập with a lacquered cabinet.

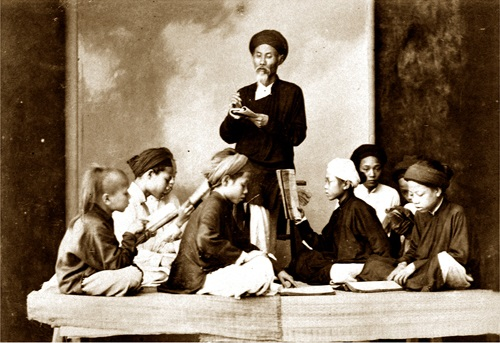
A private class at a home in Vietnam (1895). The students studying are sitting on a sập.

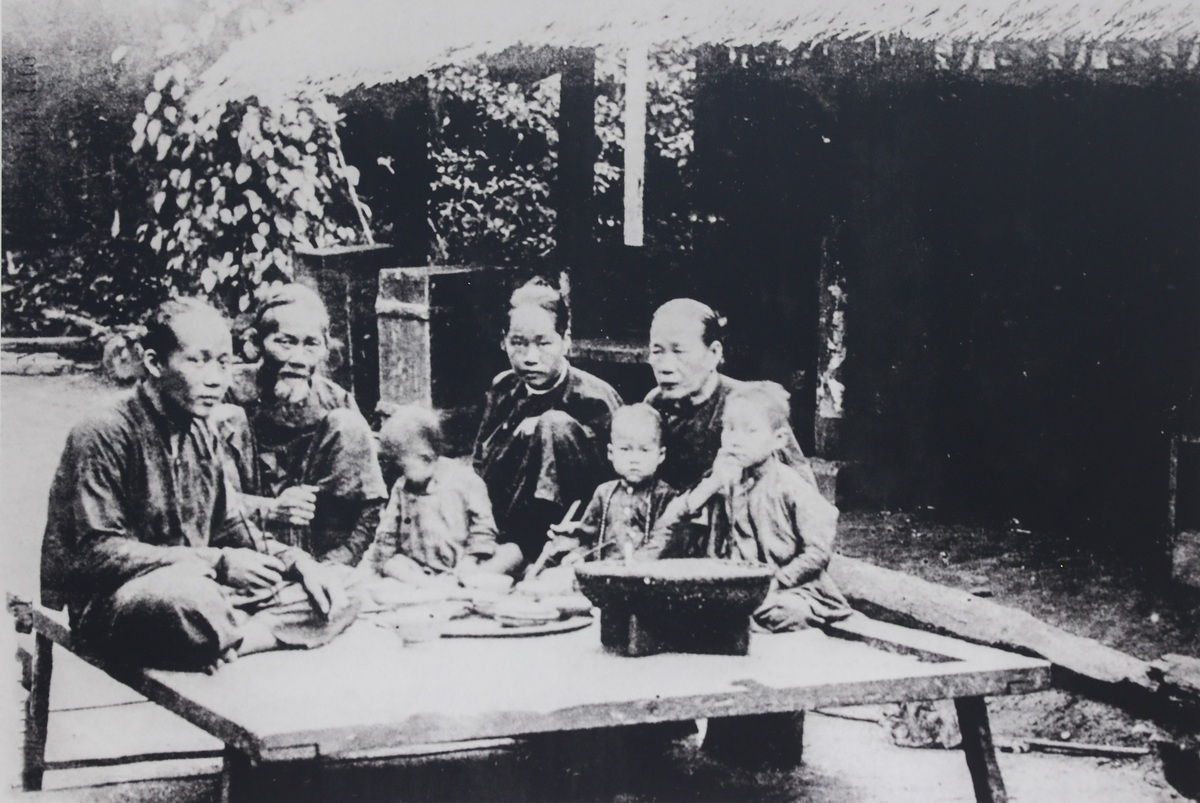
A family in Saigon eating together on top of a sập.

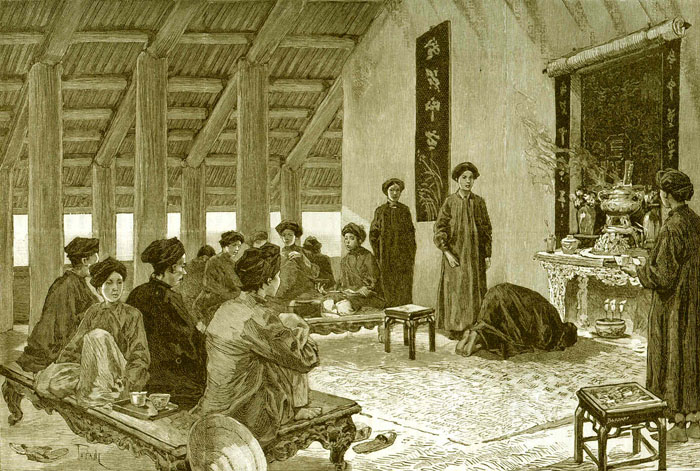
People in the Nguyễn dynasty with khăn vấn. The people in the back are sitting on a sập.

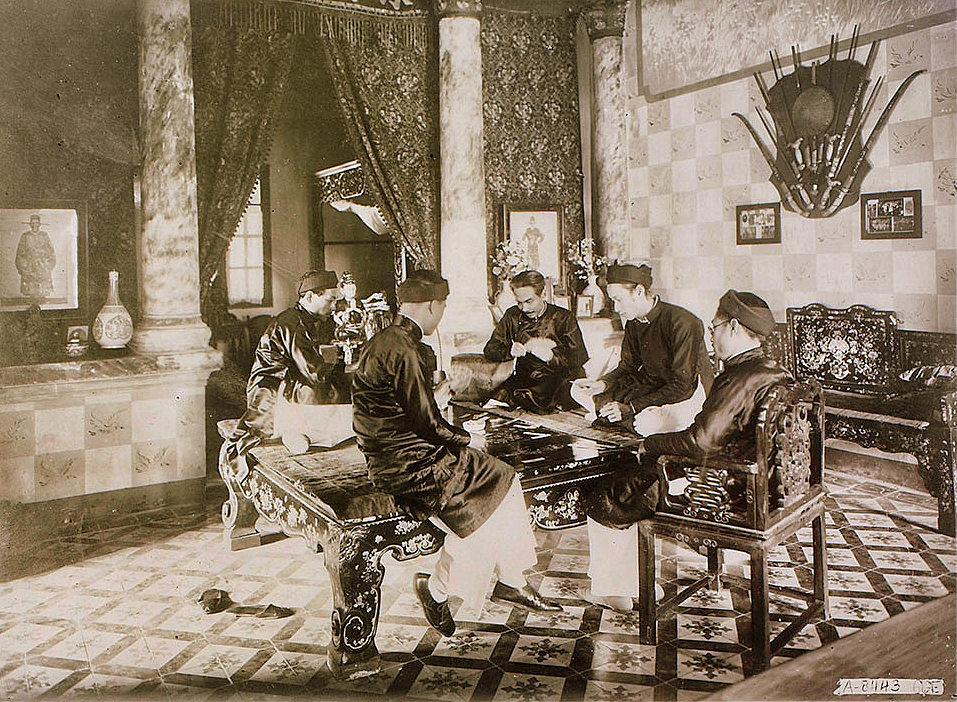
Vietnamese men playing Tổ tôm, a Vietnamese card game, on a sập.

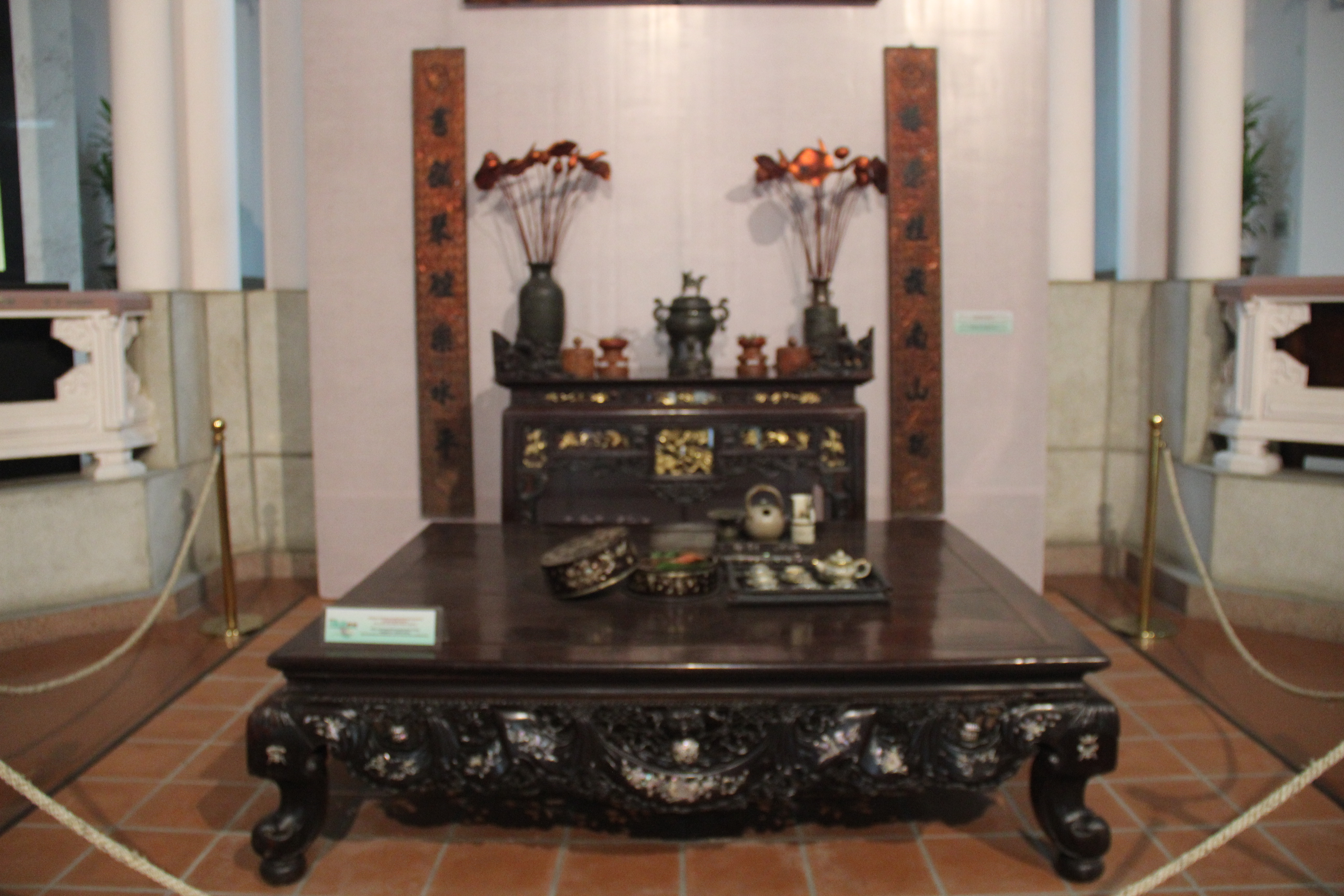
A sập in the National Museum of Vietnamese History.

== See also ==
- Tapchan (Central Asia)
