= Krama =

Traditional headwrap of Cambodia

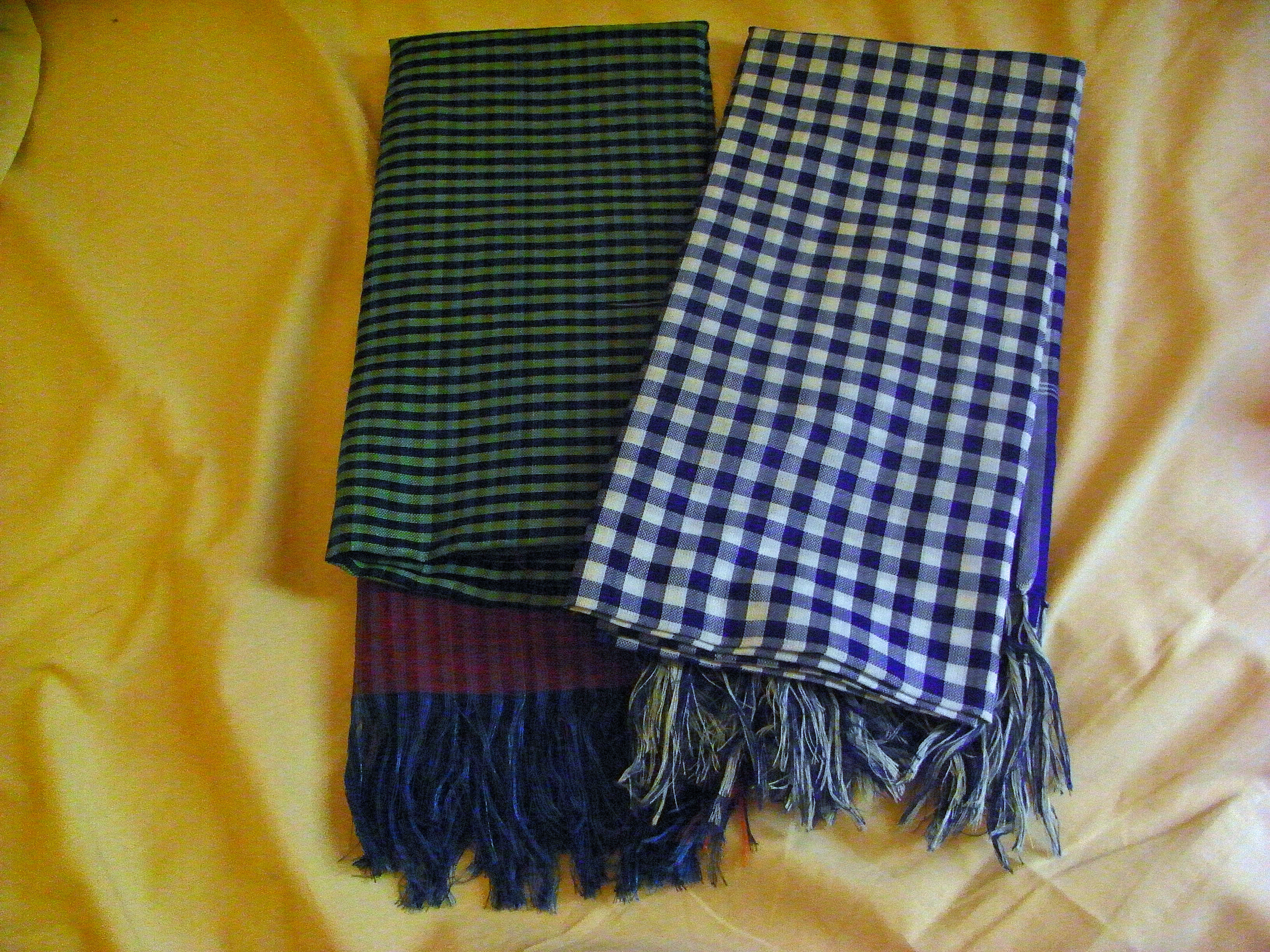
- Krama neatly folded up
- Type: Scarf
- Material: Cotton or silk
- Place of origin: Cambodia

Cultural practices and expressions linked to Krama, a traditional woven textile in Cambodia
- UNESCO Intangible Cultural Heritage
- Country: Cambodia
- Reference: 02115
- Region: Asia and the Pacific

Inscription history
- Inscription: 2024 (19th session)
- List: Representative

A krama (/krɑːˈmɑː/ krah-MAH; Khmer: ក្រមា [krɑːmaː]) is a sturdy traditional Cambodian garment with many uses, including as a scarf, bandanna, to cover the face, for decorative purposes, and as a hammock for children. It may also be used as a garrote by Bokator fighters, who also wrap the krama around their waists, heads and fists. It is worn by men, women and children, and can be fairly ornate, though most typical kramas contain a gingham pattern of some sort, and traditionally come in either red or blue. It is the Cambodian national symbol.

== History ==
According to Touch hub, director of the National Museum of Cambodia, the krama may date back to the Pre-Angkor Norkor Phnom era, between the first and fifth centuries CE. Over the period, many Shivas and other Hindu gods wearing the kben (a simple hip wrapper rolled at the waist takes the form of a large krama) have been recovered at the Angkor Borey site. A man was even pictured wearing a krama-style head covering in some instances.

Records from around 1296–1297, by Chinese envoy and diplomat Zhou Daguan show several fabrics of high quality were produced locally in Angkor Thom.

The locals of Angkor did not raise silkworms at the time, did not know how to sew, but did know how to weave cotton cloth from kapok. The inference is that their basic sampot hip wrappers were woven from cotton and were around the size of a considerable krama. Krama can be seen in some of the first photos of Cambodian costumes taken around the end of the nineteenth century. In 1896, the young French photographer and traveler Andre Salles was among the first to photograph Cambodian daily life.

Many Khmer Rouge fighters wore red and white gingham krama scarves during Pol Pot's reign. Some Cambodians may decline a red and white gingham Krama scarf in favor a blue and white scarf or another color due to the legacy of the Khmer Rouge era.

== Cultural significance ==
The production of Krama involves manual weaving using traditional hand looms called 'Kei' or 'Kei Dombanh'. Weaving and dyeing techniques are essential, and protecting the environment is crucial to ensure the quality of the materials used.

Krama is a versatile textile, serving as a scarf, belt, blanket, bandanna, lower garment, and decorative cloth in daily life. It is also used to wrap ritual offerings during religious ceremonies and celebrations. Local communities, primarily women, play a central role in Krama production, from preparing yarn to weaving. Men participate in activities such as planting cotton and sourcing natural dyes. Women are responsible for passing on the weaving skills to the next generation.

While individual weavers have become scarce, professional Krama groups and producers have taken up the mantle. The tradition endures in 15 active communities and associations, with skilled weavers imparting their knowledge. Educational associations also offer training to ensure the preservation of Krama's unique characteristics.

Krama is not just a textile; it is a symbol of life's journey, from birth to death. It holds great socio-cultural significance, expressing greetings, respect, and marking important life events. Whether celebrating a new addition to the family, honoring weddings, or paying tribute to the departed, Krama is a cherished emblem of the Cambodian cultural heritage, passed down through generations.

== Gallery ==
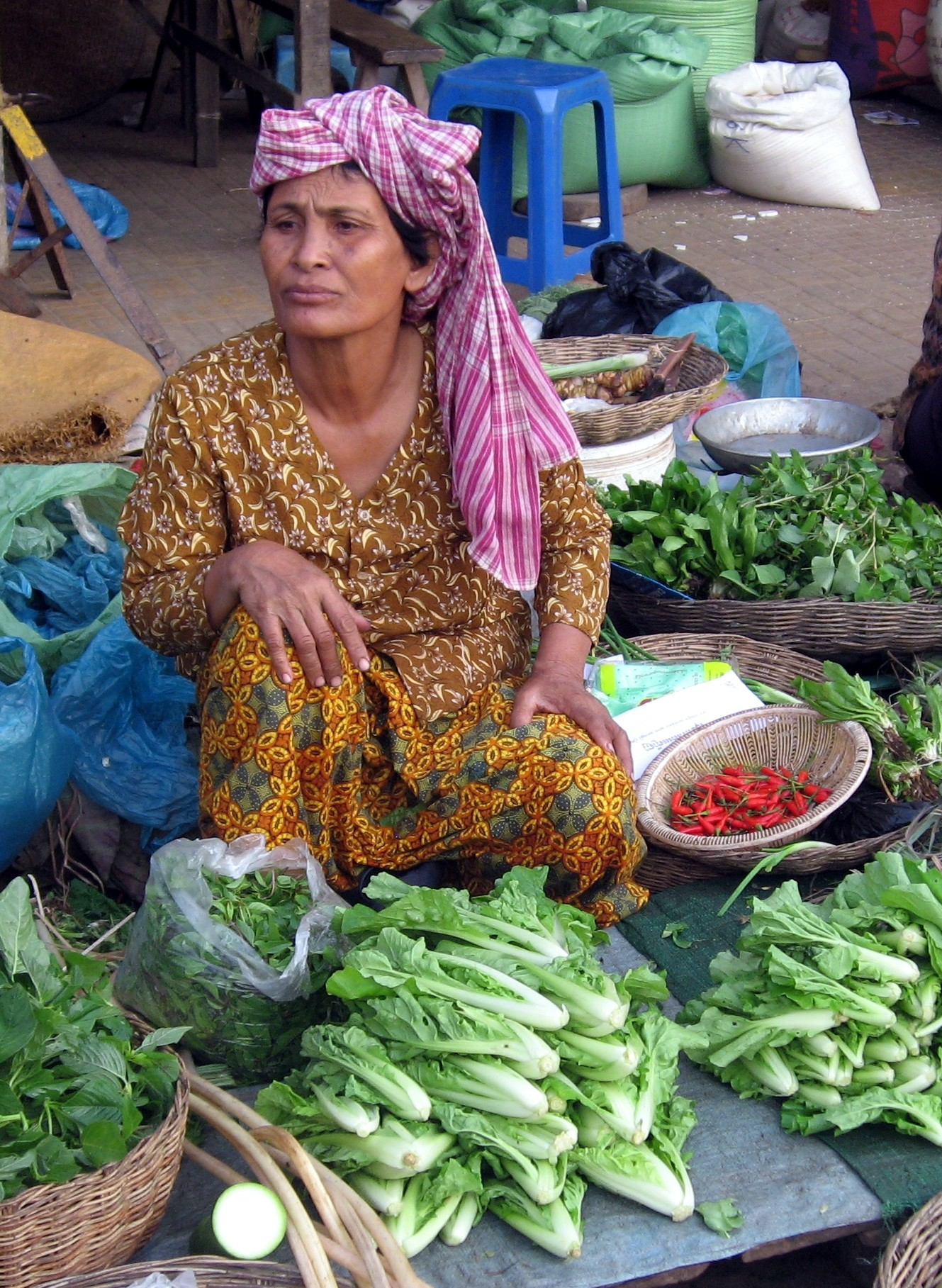

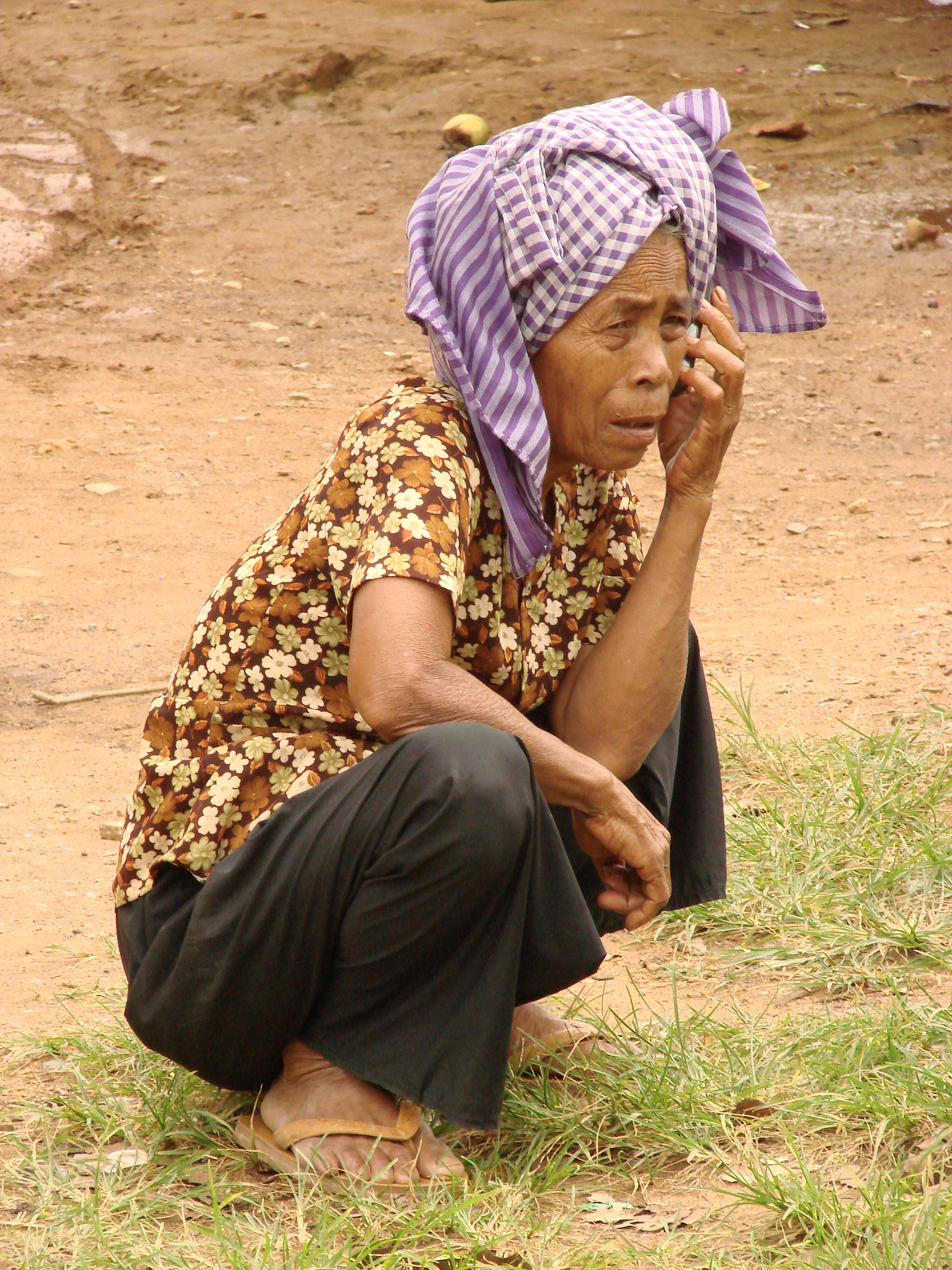

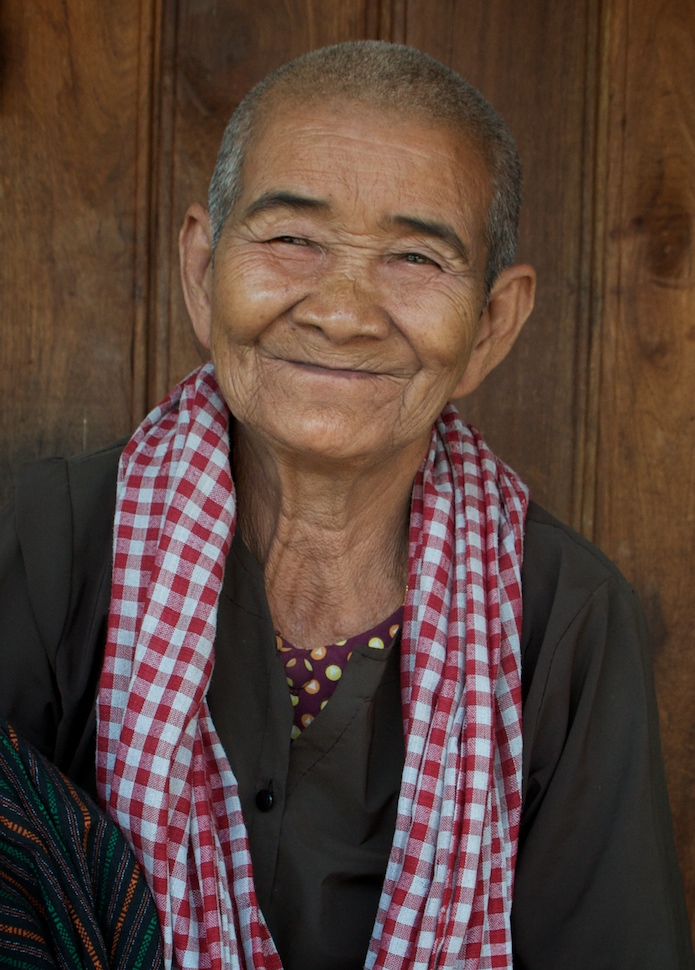

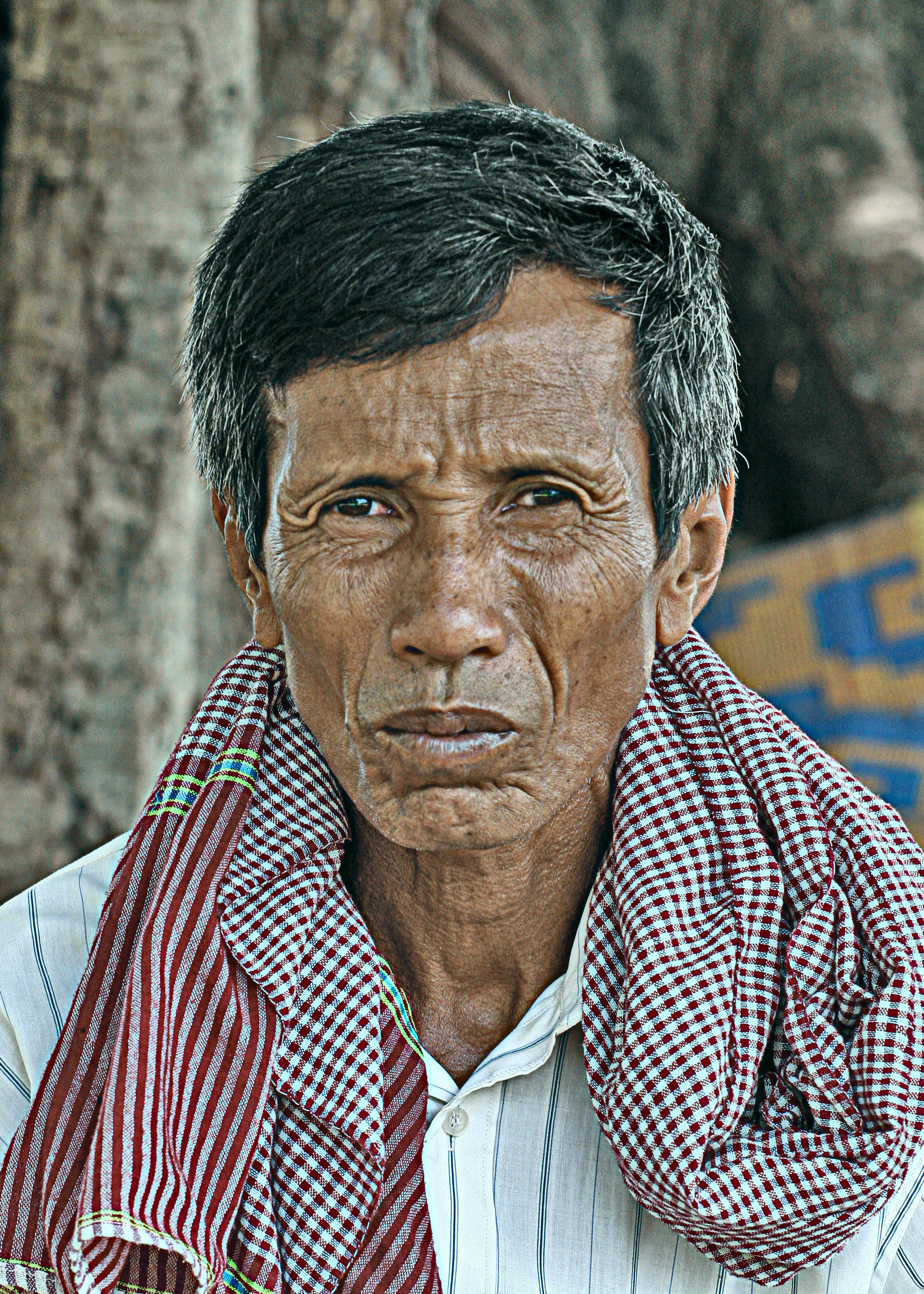

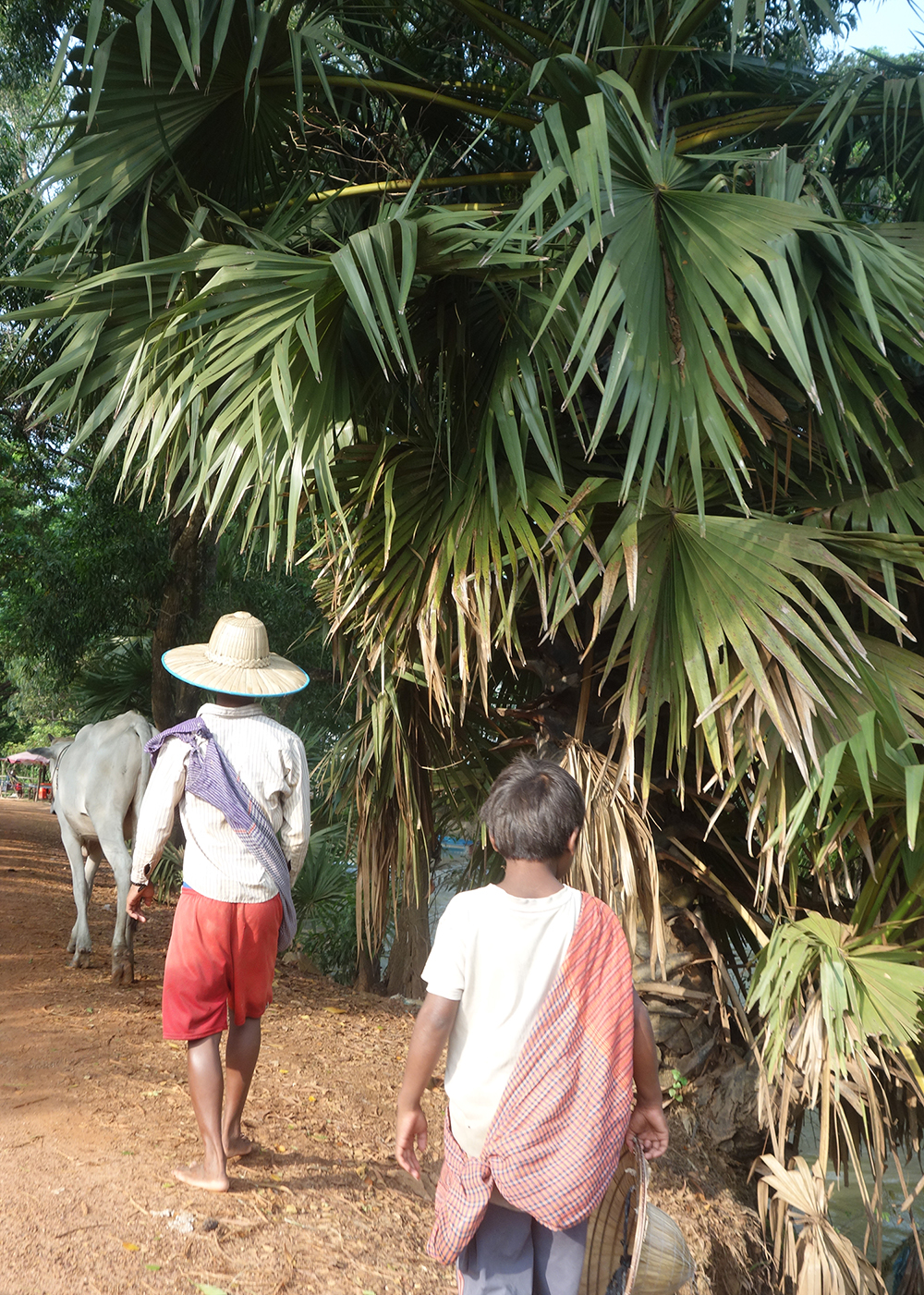
Krama as a sleeve

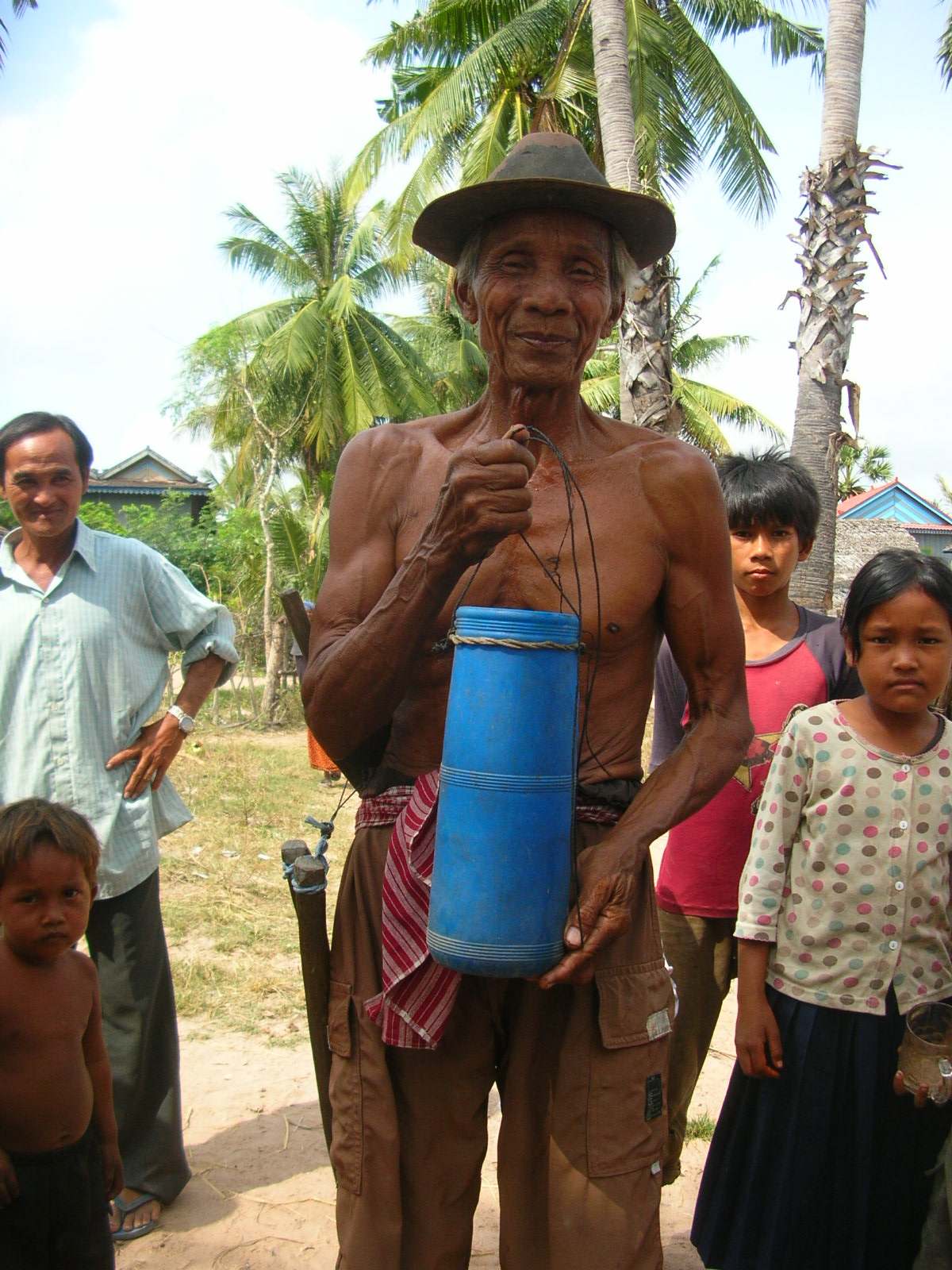
Krama as a belt

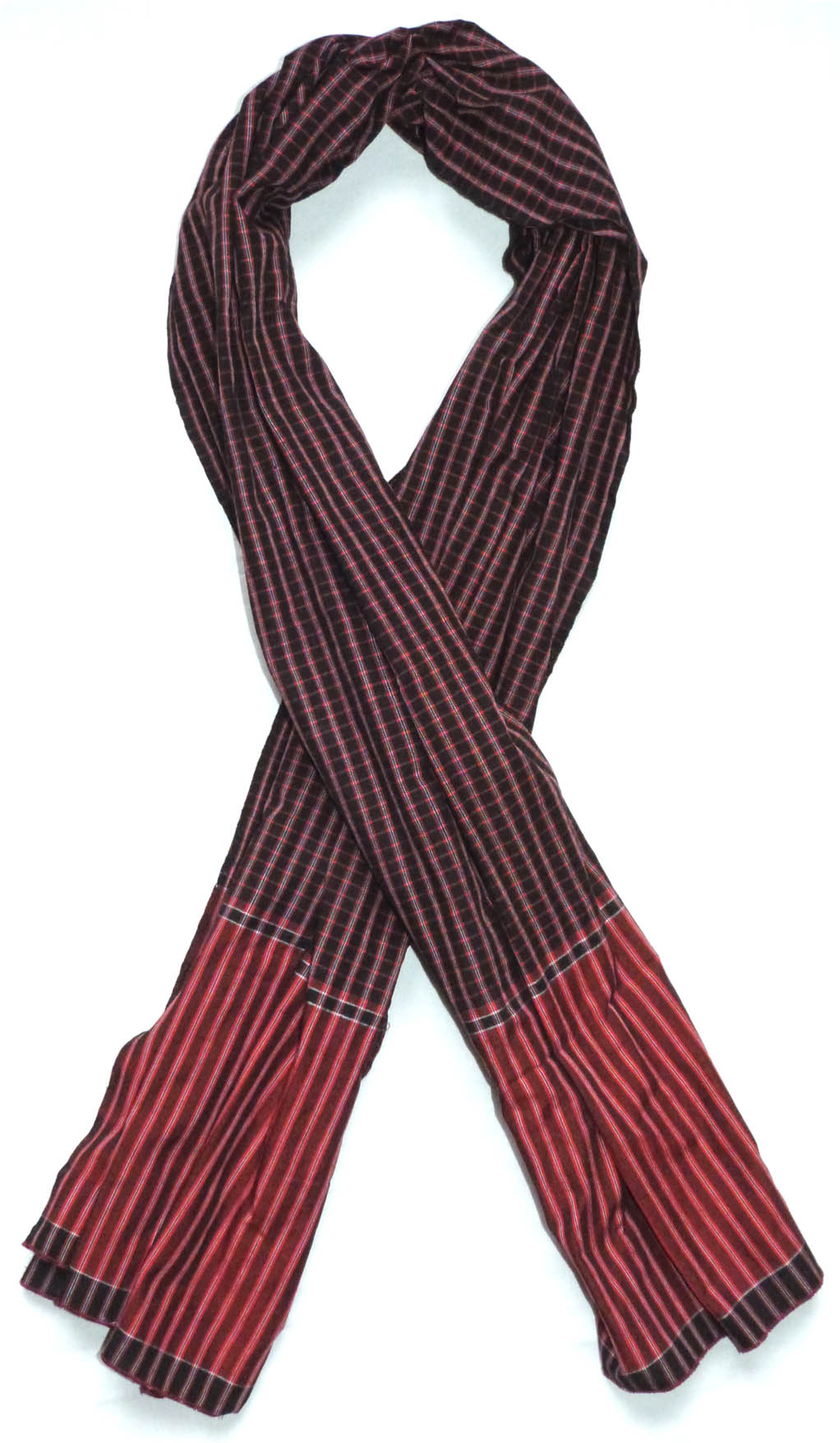

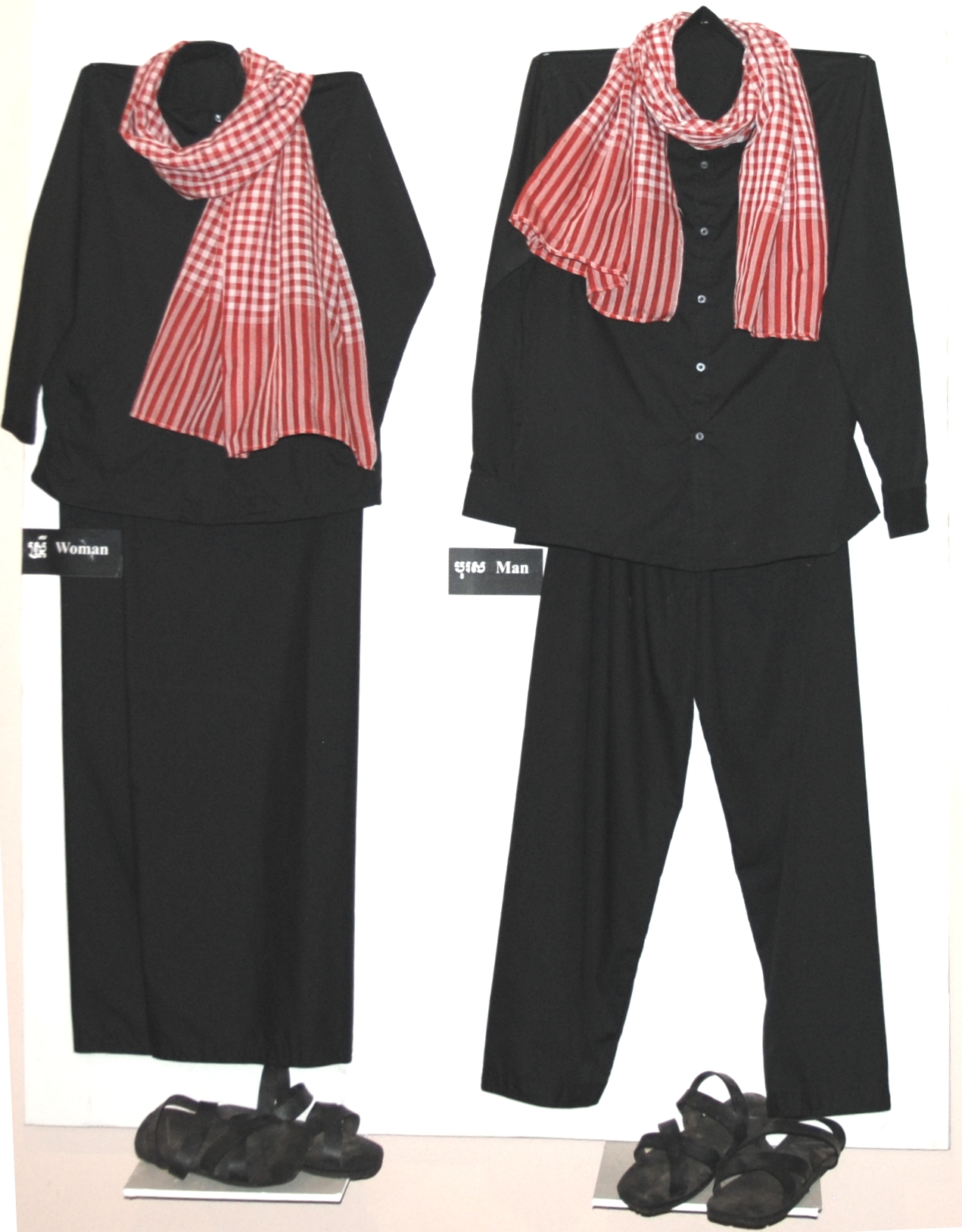
Khmer Rouge uniforms, including the krama

== See also ==
- Agal, Arabian headdress
- Gamosa, traditional multi-use cloth from Assam
- Gamcha, scarf from Bengal
- Gingham
- Keffiyeh, traditional Middle Eastern headdress
- Sudra, traditional Jewish headdress
- Tagelmust, scarf from Sahara
- Turban, head scarf
- Khăn rằn, Vietnamese head scarf
