= Tapchan =

Outdoor furniture

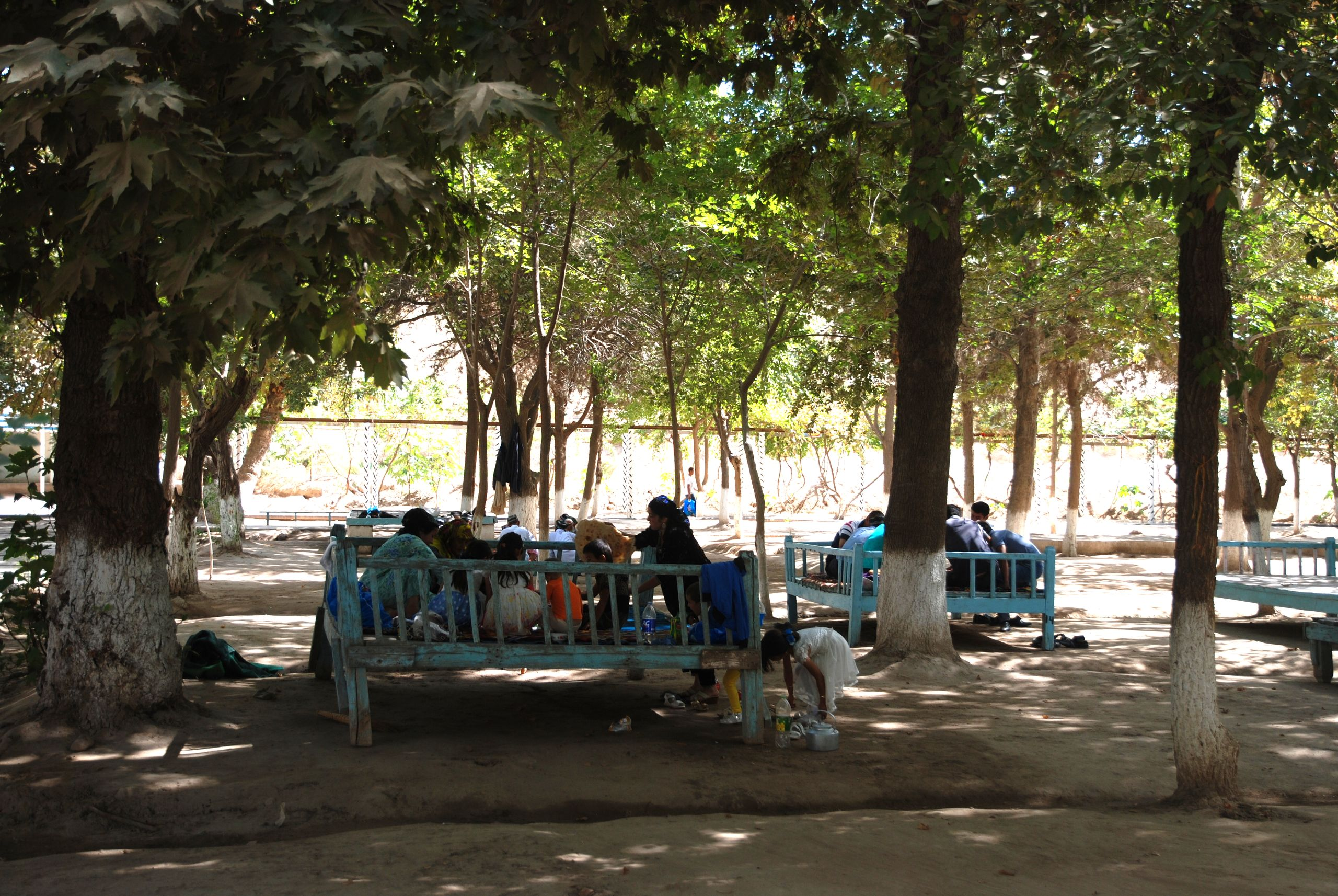
Tapchans near Bokhtar, Tajikistan

A tapchan (топчан) is a type of outdoor furniture unique to Central Asia especially Tajikistan and Uzbekistan, combining a large bed capable of holding 4-8 adults with a table at which meals can be eaten.. It is similar or identical to the Malay bale-bale, 'wooden raised platform'.

== Variants ==
Although typically an outdoor fixture, they are also found indoors, for instance at roadside restaurants, since they allow the customer to both rest and eat. Private homes with a tapchan in the yard often build canopy posts with either a fixed shade or curtains.
