= Hakimabad =

Hakimabad (Persian: حكيم اباد) may refer to:

- Hakimabad, Golestan
- Hakimabad, Markazi
- Hakimabad, Qazvin
- Hakimabad, Chenaran, Razavi Khorasan Province
- Hakimabad, Golbajar, Chenaran County, Razavi Khorasan Province
- Hakimabad, Fariman, Razavi Khorasan Province
- Hakimabad, Nishapur, Razavi Khorasan Province
- Hakimabad, Khash, Sistan and Baluchestan Province
- Hakimabad, Tehran
- Hakimabad, Bafq, Yazd Province
- Hakimabad, Taft, Yazd Province
- Hakimabad Rural District, in Markazi Province
- Hakimabad, Narayangonj, Bangladesh
