= Yahyaabad, Markazi =

Village in Markazi province, Iran

Yahyaabad Persian: يحيي اباد
- Village
- Location within Iran
- Coordinates: 35°32′06″N 50°36′58″E
- Country: Iran
- Province: Markazi
- County: Zarandiyeh
- District: Zaviyeh
- Rural District: Rahmatabad

Population (2016)
  - Total: 23
- Time zone: UTC+3:30 (IRST)

Yahyaabad (Persian: يحيي اباد) (Note: Also romanized as Yaḩyáābād) is a village in Rahmatabad Rural District of Zaviyeh District in Zarandiyeh County, Markazi province, Iran.

== Demographics ==
=== Population ===
At the time of the 2006 and 2011 National Censuses, the village's population was below the reporting threshold, when it was in Hakimabad Rural District of the Central District. The 2016 census measured the population of the village as 23 people in 10 households.

In 2021, the rural district was separated from the district in the formation of Zaviyeh District. Yahyaabad was transferred to Rahmatabad Rural District created in the new district.
