= Ebrahimabad, Zarandiyeh =

Village in Markazi province, Iran

Ebrahimabad Persian: ابراهیم‌آباد
- Village
- Location within Iran
- Coordinates: 35°31′25″N 50°31′06″E
- Country: Iran
- Province: Markazi
- County: Zarandiyeh
- District: Zaviyeh
- Rural District: Rahmatabad

Population (2016)
  - Total: 15
- Time zone: UTC+3:30 (IRST)

Ebrahimabad (Persian: ابراهیم‌آباد) (Note: Also romanized as Ebrāhīmābād; also known as Ebrāhīmābād-e Fūlādlū, Fūlādī, Qeshlāq-e Fūlādī, and Qishlāq Faulādi) is a village in Rahmatabad Rural District of Zaviyeh District in Zarandiyeh County, Markazi province, Iran.

== Demographics ==
=== Population ===
At the time of the 2006 National Census, the village's population was 22 in five households, when it was in Hakimabad Rural District of the Central District. The following census in 2011 counted 14 people in four households. The 2016 census measured the population of the village as 15 people in five households.

In 2021, the rural district was separated from the district in the formation of Zaviyeh District. Ebrahimabad was transferred to Rahmatabad Rural District created in the new district.
