= Esmailabad, Zarandiyeh =

Village in Markazi province, Iran

Esmailabad Persian: اسماعيل اباد
- Village
- Location within Iran
- Coordinates: 35°28′49″N 50°35′21″E
- Country: Iran
- Province: Markazi
- County: Zarandiyeh
- District: Zaviyeh
- Rural District: Rahmatabad

Population (2016)
  - Total: 128
- Time zone: UTC+3:30 (IRST)

Esmailabad (Persian: اسماعیل‌آباد) (Note: Also romanized as Esmā‘īlābād; also known as Qeshlāq-e Esmā‘īlābād and Qeshlāq-e Esmā‘īlābād Kūchaklī) is a village in Rahmatabad Rural District of Zaviyeh District in Zarandiyeh County, Markazi province, Iran.

== Demographics ==
=== Population ===
At the time of the 2006 National Census, the village's population was 114 in 26 households, when it was in Hakimabad Rural District of the Central District. The following census in 2011 counted 121 people in 31 households. The 2016 census measured the population of the village as 128 people in 40 households.

In 2021, the rural district was separated from the district in the formation of Zaviyeh District. Esmailabad was transferred to Rahmatabad Rural District created in the new district.
