= Hasanabad-e Qarah Darband =

Village in Markazi province, Iran

Hasanabad-e Qarah Darband Persian: حسن ابادقره دربند
- Village
- Location within Iran
- Coordinates: 35°29′41″N 50°33′17″E
- Country: Iran
- Province: Markazi
- County: Zarandiyeh
- District: Zaviyeh
- Rural District: Rahmatabad

Population (2016)
  - Total: 45
- Time zone: UTC+3:30 (IRST)

Hasanabad-e Qarah Darband (Persian: حسن ابادقره دربند) (Note: Also romanized as Ḩasanābād-e Qarah Darband; also known as Ḩasanābād, Qarah Darband, and Qeshlāq-e Ḩasanābād) is a village in Rahmatabad Rural District of Zaviyeh District in Zarandiyeh County, Markazi province, Iran.

== Demographics ==
=== Population ===
At the time of the 2006 National Census, the village's population was 51 in 10 households, when it was in Hakimabad Rural District of the Central District. The following census in 2011 counted 51 people in 12 households. The 2016 census measured the population of the village as 45 people in 12 households.

In 2021, the rural district was separated from the district in the formation of Zaviyeh District. Hasanabad-e Qarah Darband was transferred to Rahmatabad Rural District created in the new district.
