= Hajjiabad, Zarandiyeh =

Village in Markazi province, Iran

Hajjiabad Persian: حاجي اباد
- Village
- Location within Iran
- Coordinates: 35°31′00″N 50°35′50″E
- Country: Iran
- Province: Markazi
- County: Zarandiyeh
- District: Zaviyeh
- Rural District: Rahmatabad

Population (2016)
  - Total: 61
- Time zone: UTC+3:30 (IRST)

Hajjiabad (Persian: حاجي اباد) (Note: Also romanized as Ḩājīābād and Hājjīābād; also known as Ḩājjīābād-e ‘Olyā) is a village in Rahmatabad Rural District of Zaviyeh District in Zarandiyeh County, Markazi province, Iran.

== Demographics ==
=== Population ===
At the time of the 2006 National Census, the village's population was 31 in nine households, when it was in Hakimabad Rural District of the Central District. The following census in 2011 counted 44 people in 14 households. The 2016 census measured the population of the village as 61 people in 19 households.

In 2021, the rural district was separated from the district in the formation of Zaviyeh District. Hajjiabad was transferred to Rahmatabad Rural District created in the new district.
