= Rahmatabad, Markazi =

Village in Markazi province, Iran

Rahmatabad Persian: رحمت اباد
- Village
- Location within Iran
- Coordinates: 35°24′21″N 50°31′00″E
- Country: Iran
- Province: Markazi
- County: Zarandiyeh
- District: Zaviyeh
- Rural District: Rahmatabad

Population (2016)
  - Total: 553
- Time zone: UTC+3:30 (IRST)

Rahmatabad (Persian: رحمت اباد) (Note: Also romanized as Raḩmatābād) is a village in, and the capital of, Rahmatabad Rural District in Zaviyeh District of Zarandiyeh County, Markazi province, Iran.

== Demographics ==
=== Ethnicity ===
Original inhabitants of the village were from Turkic descendants, immigrated during Seljukians conquests.

During constitutional revolution, the village became surrounded with battlement and gates to serve as a castle for Iran central plateau en route Tehran, new capital for Qajarid monarchy. Afterwards, tribes from other regions including Yazd, Kashan and Shiraz were forced to reside in the village.

The new migrants adopted the inhabitants language and culture, but nowadays resulting from governmental assimilation program, the language and customs have changed to which of Persians.

=== Population ===
At the time of the 2006 National Census, the village's population was 426 in 112 households, when it was in Hakimabad Rural District of the Central District. The following census in 2011 counted 397 people in 126 households. The 2016 census measured the population of the village as 553 people in 188 households.

In 2021, the rural district was separated from the district in the formation of Zaviyeh District. Rahmatabad was transferred to Rahmatabad Rural District created in the new district.
