= Moqdadiyeh =

Village in Markazi province, Iran

Moqdadiyeh Persian: مقداديه
- Village
- Country: Iran
- Province: Markazi
- County: Zarandiyeh
- District: Zaviyeh
- Rural District: Rahmatabad

Population (2016)
  - Total: 86
- Time zone: UTC+3:30 (IRST)

Moqdadiyeh (Persian: مقداديه) (Note: Also romanized as Moqdādīyeh) is a village in Rahmatabad Rural District of Zaviyeh District in Zarandiyeh County, Markazi province, Iran.

== Demographics ==
=== Population ===
At the time of the 2006 National Census, the village's population was 45 in 10 households, when it was in Hakimabad Rural District of the Central District. The following census in 2011 counted 57 people in 13 households. The 2016 census measured the population of the village as 86 people in 24 households.

In 2021, the rural district was separated from the district in the formation of Zaviyeh District. Moqdadiyeh was transferred to Rahmatabad Rural District created in the new district.
