= Shir Ali Beyglu =

Village in Markazi province, Iran

Shir Ali Beyglu Persian: شيرعلي بيگلو
- Village
- Location within Iran
- Coordinates: 35°29′48″N 50°37′17″E
- Country: Iran
- Province: Markazi
- County: Zarandiyeh
- District: Zaviyeh
- Rural District: Rahmatabad

Population (2016)
  - Total: 35
- Time zone: UTC+3:30 (IRST)

Shir Ali Beyglu (Persian: شيرعلي بيگلو) (Note: Also romanized as Shīr ‘Alī Beyglū, Shir Ali Biglu, and Shīr ‘Alī Bīglū; also known as Shīr ‘Alī Baklū and Shīr ‘Alī Beglū) is a village in Rahmatabad Rural District of Zaviyeh District in Zarandiyeh County, Markazi province, Iran.

== Demographics ==
=== Population ===
At the time of the 2006 National Census, the village's population was 24 in seven households, when it was in Hakimabad Rural District of the Central District. The following census in 2011 counted 19 people in six households. The 2016 census measured the population of the village as 35 people in 11 households.

In 2021, the rural district was separated from the district in the formation of Zaviyeh District. Shir Ali Beyglu was transferred to Rahmatabad Rural District created in the new district.
