= Qeshlaq-e Qarah Zagheh =

Village in Markazi province, Iran

Qeshlaq-e Qarah Zagheh Persian: قشلاق قره زاغه
- Village
- Location within Iran
- Coordinates: 35°29′25″N 50°26′02″E
- Country: Iran
- Province: Markazi
- County: Zarandiyeh
- District: Zaviyeh
- Rural District: Rahmatabad

Population (2016)
  - Total: 80
- Time zone: UTC+3:30 (IRST)

Qeshlaq-e Qarah Zagheh (Persian: قشلاق قره زاغه) (Note: Also romanized as Qeshlāq-e Qarah Zāgheh) is a village in Rahmatabad Rural District of Zaviyeh District in Zarandiyeh County, Markazi province, Iran.

== Demographics ==
=== Population ===
At the time of the 2006 National Census, the village's population was 44 in 13 households, when it was in Hakimabad Rural District of the Central District. The following census in 2011 counted 46 people in 12 households. The 2016 census measured the population of the village as 80 people in 23 households.

In 2021, the rural district was separated from the district in the formation of Zaviyeh District. Qeshlaq-e Qarah Zagheh was transferred to Rahmatabad Rural District created in the new district.
