= Gavi Cheshmeh =

Village in Markazi province, Iran

Gavi Cheshmeh Persian: گوي چشمه
- Village
- Location within Iran
- Country: Iran
- Province: Markazi
- County: Zarandiyeh
- District: Zaviyeh
- Rural District: Rahmatabad

Population (2016)
  - Total: 31
- Time zone: UTC+3:30 (IRST)

Gavi Cheshmeh (Persian: گوي چشمه) (Note: Also romanized as Gavī Cheshmeh; also known as Gavcheshmeh) is a village in Rahmatabad Rural District of Zaviyeh District in Zarandiyeh County, Markazi province, Iran.

== Demographics ==
=== Population ===
At the time of the 2006 National Census, the village's population was 39 in eight households, when it was in Hakimabad Rural District of the Central District. The following census in 2011 counted 39 people in 14 households. The 2016 census measured the population of the village as 31 people in 11 households.

In 2021, the rural district was separated from the district in the formation of Zaviyeh District. Gavi Cheshmeh was transferred to Rahmatabad Rural District created in the new district.
