= Qeshlaq-e Musalu =

Village in Markazi province, Iran

Qeshlaq-e Musalu Persian: قشلاق موسي لو
- Village
- Location within Iran
- Coordinates: 35°32′23″N 50°29′55″E
- Country: Iran
- Province: Markazi
- County: Zarandiyeh
- District: Zaviyeh
- Rural District: Rahmatabad

Population (2016)
  - Total: 61
- Time zone: UTC+3:30 (IRST)

Qeshlaq-e Musalu (Persian: قشلاق موسي لو) (Note: Also romanized as Qeshlāq-e Mūsálū) is a village in Rahmatabad Rural District of Zaviyeh District in Zarandiyeh County, Markazi province, Iran.

== Demographics ==
=== Population ===
At the time of the 2006 National Census, the village's population was 60 in 18 households, when it was in Hakimabad Rural District of the Central District. The following census in 2011 counted 60 people in 14 households. The 2016 census measured the population of the village as 61 people in 19 households.

In 2021, the rural district was separated from the district in the formation of Zaviyeh District. Qeshlaq-e Musalu was transferred to Rahmatabad Rural District created in the new district.
