= Karimabad, Markazi =

Village in Markazi province, Iran

Karimabad Persian: كريماباد
- Village
- Location within Iran
- Coordinates: 35°16′39″N 50°26′34″E
- Country: Iran
- Province: Markazi
- County: Zarandiyeh
- District: Central
- Rural District: Khoshk Rud

Population (2016)
  - Total: 215
- Time zone: UTC+3:30 (IRST)

Karimabad (Persian: كريماباد) (Note: Also romanized as Karīmābād) is a village in Khoshk Rud Rural District of the Central District in Zarandiyeh County, Markazi province, Iran.

== Demographics ==
=== Population ===
At the time of the 2006 National Census, the village's population was 221 in 56 households, when it was in Hakimabad Rural District of the Central District. The following census in 2011 counted 127 people in 35 households. The 2016 census measured the population of the village as 215 people in 57 households.

In 2021, the rural district was separated from the district in the formation of Zaviyeh District, and Karimabad was transferred to Khoshk Rud Rural District.
