= Qeshlaq-e Sardar =

Village in Markazi province, Iran

Qeshlaq-e Sardar Persian: قشلاق سردار
- Village
- Location within Iran
- Coordinates: 35°28′42″N 50°18′40″E
- Country: Iran
- Province: Markazi
- County: Zarandiyeh
- District: Zaviyeh
- Rural District: Rahmatabad

Population (2016)
  - Total: 61
- Time zone: UTC+3:30 (IRST)

Qeshlaq-e Sardar (Persian: قشلاق سردار) (Note: Also romanized as Qeshlāq-e Sardār) is a village in Rahmatabad Rural District of Zaviyeh District in Zarandiyeh County, Markazi province, Iran.

== Demographics ==
=== Population ===
At the time of the 2006 National Census, the village's population was below the reporting threshold, when it was in Khoshk Rud Rural District of the Central District. The following census in 2011 counted 25 people in eight households. The 2016 census measured the population of the village as 61 people in 17 households.

In 2021, the village was separated from the district in the formation of Zaviyeh District and transferred to Rahmatabad Rural District created in the new district.
