= Aghozi Gang =

Village in Markazi province, Iran

Aghozi Gang Persian: اغذي گنگ
- Village
- Location within Iran
- Coordinates: 35°27′30″N 50°27′34″E
- Country: Iran
- Province: Markazi
- County: Zarandiyeh
- District: Zaviyeh
- Rural District: Rahmatabad

Population (2016)
  - Total: 327
- Time zone: UTC+3:30 (IRST)

Aghozi Gang (Persian: اغذي گنگ) (Note: Also romanized as Āghoz̄ī Gang and Āghz̄ī Gang; also known as Aq Zekīnk and Aqziqarq) is a village in Rahmatabad Rural District of Zaviyeh District in Zarandiyeh County, Markazi province, Iran.

== Demographics ==
=== Population ===
At the time of the 2006 National Census, the village's population was 291 in 73 households, when it was in Hakimabad Rural District of the Central District. The following census in 2011 counted 230 people in 71 households. The 2016 census measured the population of the village as 327 people in 71 households.

In 2021, the rural district was separated from the district in the formation of Zaviyeh District. Aghozi Gang was transferred to Rahmatabad Rural District created in the new district.
