= Khorramabad-e Laqu =

Village in Markazi province, Iran

Khorramabad-e Laqu Persian: خرم ابادلاقو
- Village
- Location within Iran
- Country: Iran
- Province: Markazi
- County: Zarandiyeh
- District: Zaviyeh
- Rural District: Rahmatabad

Population (2016)
  - Total: 88
- Time zone: UTC+3:30 (IRST)

Khorramabad-e Laqu (Persian: خرم ابادلاقو) (Note: Also romanized as Khorramābād-e Laqū; also known as Khorramābād) is a village in Rahmatabad Rural District of Zaviyeh District in Zarandiyeh County, Markazi province, Iran.

== Demographics ==
=== Population ===
At the time of the 2006 National Census, the village's population was 54 in 12 households, when it was in Hakimabad Rural District of the Central District. The following census in 2011 counted 49 people in 15 households. The 2016 census measured the population of the village as 88 people in 28 households.

In 2021, the rural district was separated from the district in the formation of Zaviyeh District. Khorramabad-e Laqu was transferred to Rahmatabad Rural District created in the new district.
