= Qeshlaq-e Bashir =

Village in Markazi province, Iran

Qeshlaq-e Bashir Persian: قشلاق بشير
- Village
- Country: Iran
- Province: Markazi
- County: Zarandiyeh
- District: Zaviyeh
- Rural District: Rahmatabad

Population (2016)
  - Total: 90
- Time zone: UTC+3:30 (IRST)

Qeshlaq-e Bashir (Persian: قشلاق بشير) (Note: Also romanized as Qeshlāq-e Bashīr) is a village in Rahmatabad Rural District of Zaviyeh District in Zarandiyeh County, Markazi province, Iran.

== Demographics ==
=== Population ===
At the time of the 2006 National Census, the village's population was below the reporting threshold, when it was in Khoshk Rud Rural District of the Central District. The following census in 2011 counted 60 people in 18 households. The 2016 census measured the population of the village as 90 people in 30 households.

In 2021, the village was separated from the district in the formation of Zaviyeh District and transferred to Rahmatabad Rural District created in the new district.
