= Ahmadabad, Zarandiyeh =

Village in Markazi province, Iran

Ahmadabad Persian: احمداباد
- Village
- Location within Iran
- Country: Iran
- Province: Markazi
- County: Zarandiyeh
- District: Central
- Rural District: Khoshk Rud

Population (2016)
  - Total: 0
- Time zone: UTC+3:30 (IRST)

Ahmadabad (Persian: احمداباد) (Note: Also romanized as Aḩmadābād) is a village in Khoshk Rud Rural District of the Central District in Zarandiyeh County, Markazi province, Iran.

== Demographics ==
=== Population ===
At the time of the 2006 National Census, the village's population was 13 in four households, when it was in Hakimabad Rural District of the Central District. The following census in 2011 counted a population below the reporting threshold. The 2016 census measured the population of the village as zero.

In 2021, the rural district was separated from the district in the formation of Zaviyeh District, and Ahmadabad was transferred to Khoshk Rud Rural District.
