= Aliabad, Rahmatabad =

Village in Markazi province, Iran

Aliabad Persian: علي آباد
- Village
- Country: Iran
- Province: Markazi
- County: Zarandiyeh
- District: Zaviyeh
- Rural District: Rahmatabad

Population (2016)
  - Total: 72
- Time zone: UTC+3:30 (IRST)

Aliabad (Persian: علي آباد) (Note: Also romanized as ‘Alīābād) is a village in Rahmatabad Rural District of Zaviyeh District in Zarandiyeh County, Markazi province, Iran.

== Demographics ==
=== Population ===
At the time of the 2011 National Census, the village's population was 26 in six households, when it was in Khoshk Rud Rural District of the Central District. The 2016 census measured the population of the village as 72 people in 22 households.

In 2021, the village was separated from the district in the formation of Zaviyeh District and transferred to Rahmatabad Rural District created in the new district.
