= Bar Bar =

Village in Markazi province, Iran

Bar Bar Persian: بربر
- Village
- Location within Iran
- Coordinates: 35°19′30″N 50°29′12″E
- Country: Iran
- Province: Markazi
- County: Zarandiyeh
- District: Central
- Rural District: Khoshk Rud

Population (2016)
  - Total: 498
- Time zone: UTC+3:30 (IRST)

Bar Bar (Persian: بربر) is a village in Khoshk Rud Rural District of the Central District in Zarandiyeh County, Markazi province, Iran.

== Demographics ==
=== Population ===
At the time of the 2006 National Census, the village's population was 523 in 134 households, when it was in Hakimabad Rural District of the Central District. The following census in 2011 counted 573 people in 163 households. The 2016 census measured the population of the village as 498 people in 156 households.

In 2021, the rural district was separated from the district in the formation of Zaviyeh District, and Bar Bar was transferred to Khoshk Rud Rural District.
