= Abbasabad-e Piazi =

Village in Markazi province, Iran

Abbasabad-e Piazi Persian: عباس ابادپيازي
- Village
- Location within Iran
- Coordinates: 35°23′55″N 50°28′26″E
- Country: Iran
- Province: Markazi
- County: Zarandiyeh
- District: Zaviyeh
- Rural District: Hakimabad

Population (2016)
  - Total: 258
- Time zone: UTC+3:30 (IRST)

Abbasabad-e Piazi (Persian: عباس ابادپيازي) (Note: Also romanized as ‘Abbāsābād-e Pīāzī; also known as ‘Abbāsābād, ‘Abbāsābād-e Bard ‘Alī, and ‘Abbāsābād-e Zarand) is a village in Hakimabad Rural District of Zaviyeh District in Zarandiyeh County, Markazi province, Iran.

== Demographics ==
=== Population ===
At the time of the 2006 National Census, the village's population was 303 in 75 households, when it was in the Central District. The following census in 2011 counted 283 people in 86 households. The 2016 census measured the population of the village as 258 people in 80 households.

In 2021, the rural district was separated from the district in the formation of Zaviyeh District.
