= Sadrabad, Markazi =

Village in Markazi province, Iran

Sadrabad Persian: صدراباد
- Village
- Location within Iran
- Coordinates: 35°20′52″N 50°34′18″E
- Country: Iran
- Province: Markazi
- County: Zarandiyeh
- District: Zaviyeh
- Rural District: Hakimabad

Population (2016)
  - Total: 1,191
- Time zone: UTC+3:30 (IRST)

Sadrabad (Persian: صدراباد) (Note: Also romanized as Şadrābād) is a village in Hakimabad Rural District of Zaviyeh District in Zarandiyeh County, Markazi province, Iran.

== Demographics ==
=== Population ===
At the time of the 2006 National Census, the village's population was 1,302 in 352 households, when it was in the Central District. The following census in 2011 counted 1,198 people in 374 households. The 2016 census measured the population of the village as 1,191 people in 401 households.

In 2021, the rural district was separated from the district in the formation of Zaviyeh District.
