= Raziabad, Markazi =

Village in Markazi province, Iran

Raziabad Persian: رضي اباد
- Village
- Location within Iran
- Coordinates: 35°22′04″N 50°30′08″E
- Country: Iran
- Province: Markazi
- County: Zarandiyeh
- District: Zaviyeh
- Rural District: Hakimabad

Population (2016)
  - Total: 628
- Time zone: UTC+3:30 (IRST)

Raziabad (Persian: رضي اباد) (Note: Also romanized as Raẕīābād) is a village in Hakimabad Rural District of Zaviyeh District in Zarandiyeh County, Markazi province, Iran.

== Demographics ==
=== Population ===
At the time of the 2006 National Census, the village's population was 592 in 163 households, when it was in the Central District. The following census in 2011 counted 634 people in 192 households. The 2016 census measured the population of the village as 628 people in 212 households.

In 2021, the rural district was separated from the district in the formation of Zaviyeh District.
