= Nasirabad, Zarandiyeh =

Village in Markazi province, Iran

Nasirabad Persian: نصيراباد
- Village
- Location within Iran
- Coordinates: 35°22′26″N 50°30′21″E
- Country: Iran
- Province: Markazi
- County: Zarandiyeh
- District: Zaviyeh
- Rural District: Hakimabad

Population (2016)
  - Total: 489
- Time zone: UTC+3:30 (IRST)

Nasirabad (Persian: نصيراباد) (Note: Also romanized as Naşīrābād) is a village in Hakimabad Rural District of Zaviyeh District in Zarandiyeh County, Markazi province, Iran.

== Demographics ==
=== Population ===
At the time of the 2006 National Census, the village's population was 463 in 117 households, when it was in the Central District. The following census in 2011 counted 475 people in 130 households. The 2016 census measured the population of the village as 489 people in 155 households.

In 2021, the rural district was separated from the district in the formation of Zaviyeh District.
