= Bidlu, Markazi =

Village in Markazi province, Iran

Bidlu Persian: بيدلو
- Village
- Location within Iran
- Coordinates: 35°31′21″N 50°20′30″E
- Country: Iran
- Province: Markazi
- County: Zarandiyeh
- District: Zaviyeh
- Rural District: Rahmatabad

Population (2016)
  - Total: 199
- Time zone: UTC+3:30 (IRST)

Bidlu (Persian: بيدلو) (Note: Also romanized as Bīdlū; also known as Qeshlāq-e Bīdlū) is a village in Rahmatabad Rural District of Zaviyeh District in Zarandiyeh County, Markazi province, Iran.

== Demographics ==
=== Population ===
At the time of the 2006 National Census, the village's population was 216 in 43 households, when it was in Khoshk Rud Rural District of the Central District. The following census in 2011 counted 200 people in 58 households. The 2016 census measured the population of the village as 199 people in 59 households.

In 2021, the village was separated from the district in the formation of Zaviyeh District and transferred to Rahmatabad Rural District created in the new district.
