= Abbasabad-e Qarah Aghaj =

Village in Markazi province, Iran

Abbasabad-e Qarah Aghaj Persian: عباس ابادقره اغاج
- Village
- Location within Iran
- Coordinates: 35°12′45″N 50°20′49″E
- Country: Iran
- Province: Markazi
- County: Zarandiyeh
- District: Zaviyeh
- Rural District: Hakimabad

Population (2016)
  - Total: 0
- Time zone: UTC+3:30 (IRST)

Abbasabad-e Qarah Aghaj (Persian: عباس ابادقره اغاج) (Note: Also romanized as ‘Abbāsābād-e Qarah Āghāj; also known as ‘Abbāsābād and Morghdari-ye Safadasht (مرغداري صفادشت)) is a village in Hakimabad Rural District of Zaviyeh District in Zarandiyeh County, Markazi province, Iran.

== Demographics ==
=== Population ===
At the time of the 2006 National Census, the village's population was 17 in four households, when it was in the Central District. The 2016 census measured the population of the village as zero.

In 2021, the rural district was separated from the district in the formation of Zaviyeh District.
