= Rahmatabad Rural District (Zarandiyeh County) =

Rural district in Markazi province, Iran

Rahmatabad Rural District Persian: دهستان رحمت آباد
- Rural District
- Location within Iran
- Coordinates: 35°29′N 50°29′E
- Country: Iran
- Province: Markazi
- County: Zarandiyeh
- District: Zaviyeh
- Established: 2021
- Capital: Rahmatabad
- Time zone: UTC+3:30 (IRST)

Rahmatabad Rural District (Persian: دهستان رحمت آباد) is in Zaviyeh District of Zarandiyeh County, Markazi province, Iran. Its capital is the village of Rahmatabad, whose population at the time of the 2016 National Census was 533 in 188 households.

== History ==
In 2021, Hakimabad Rural District and the city of Zaviyeh were separated from the Central District in the formation of Zaviyeh District. Rahmatabad Rural District was created in the new district.

== Other villages in the rural district ==
- Aghozi Gang
- Aliabad
- Bidlu
- Bilaftu
- Ebrahimabad
- Esmailabad
- Gavi Cheshmeh
- Hajjiabad
- Hasanabad-e Qarah Darband
- Khorramabad-e Laqu
- Moqdadiyeh
- Qeshlaq-e Bashir
- Qeshlaq-e Musalu
- Qeshlaq-e Qarah Zagheh
- Qeshlaq-e Sabz Ali
- Qeshlaq-e Sardar
- Shir Ali Beyglu
- Yahyaabad
