= Shekarabad, Markazi =

Village in Markazi province, Iran

Shekarabad Persian: شكراباد
- Village
- Location within Iran
- Coordinates: 35°23′23″N 50°29′30″E
- Country: Iran
- Province: Markazi
- County: Zarandiyeh
- District: Zaviyeh
- Rural District: Hakimabad

Population (2016)
  - Total: 153
- Time zone: UTC+3:30 (IRST)

Shekarabad (Persian: شكراباد) (Note: Also romanized as Shekarābād) is a village in Hakimabad Rural District of Zaviyeh District in Zarandiyeh County, Markazi province, Iran.

== Demographics ==
=== Population ===
At the time of the 2006 National Census, the village's population was 153 in 41 households, when it was in the Central District. The following census in 2011 counted 152 people in 45 households. The 2016 census measured the population of the village as 153 people in 50 households.

In 2021, the rural district was separated from the district in the formation of Zaviyeh District.
