= Qeshlaq-e Sabz Ali =

Village in Markazi province, Iran

Qeshlaq-e Sabz Ali Persian: قشلاق سبزعلي
- Village
- Location within Iran
- Coordinates: 35°29′21″N 50°17′09″E
- Country: Iran
- Province: Markazi
- County: Zarandiyeh
- District: Zaviyeh
- Rural District: Rahmatabad

Population (2016)
  - Total: 13
- Time zone: UTC+3:30 (IRST)

Qeshlaq-e Sabz Ali (Persian: قشلاق سبزعلي) (Note: Also romanized as Qeshlāq-e Sabz ‘Alī) is a village in Rahmatabad Rural District of Zaviyeh District in Zarandiyeh County, Markazi province, Iran.

== Demographics ==
=== Population ===
At the time of the 2006 National Census, the village's population was 44 in eight households, when it was in Khoshk Rud Rural District of the Central District. The following census in 2011 counted 36 people in nine households. The 2016 census measured the population of the village as 13 people in four households.

In 2021, the village was separated from the district in the formation of Zaviyeh District and transferred to Rahmatabad Rural District created in the new district.
