= List of presidents of Utah State University =

The following persons have served as president of Utah State University:

No.	Image	President	Term start	Term end	Refs.
Presidents of the Agricultural College of Utah (1888–1928)
1		Jeremiah W. Sanborn	May 17, 1890	May 31, 1894	
2		Joshua H. Paul	June 1, 1894	April 25, 1896	
3		Joseph M. Tanner	April 28, 1896	June 10, 1900	
4		William J. Kerr	June 11, 1900	March 26, 1907	
5		John A. Widtsoe	March 27, 1907	February 16, 1916	
6		Elmer George Peterson	February 17, 1916	June 30, 1945	
Presidents of the Utah State Agricultural College (1928–1957)
7		Franklin S. Harris	July 1, 1945	June 30, 1950	
8		Louis Linden Madsen	July 1, 1950	April 25, 1953	
9		Henry Aldous Dixon	August 8, 1953	December 2, 1954 (Note: Resigned to be a U.S. representative.)	
10		Daryl Chase	December 3, 1954	June 30, 1968	
Presidents of the Utah State University (1957–present)
11		Glen L. Taggart	July 1, 1968	June 15, 1979	
12		Stanford Cazier	June 15, 1979	June 30, 1992	
13		George H. Emert	July 1, 1992	December 31, 2000	
14		Kermit L. Hall	January 1, 2001	January 31, 2005 (Note: Resigned to lead University at Albany.)	
15		Stan L. Albrecht	February 1, 2005	December 31, 2016	
16		Noelle E. Cockett	January 1, 2017	July 31, 2023	
17		Elizabeth "Betsy" R. Cantwell	August 1, 2023	February 19, 2025 (Note: Resigned to lead Washington State University.)	
interim		Alan L. Smith	February 20, 2025	November 9, 2025	
18		Brad L. Mortensen	November 10, 2025	present	

Table notes:
