= Najafabad, Zarandiyeh =

Village in Markazi province, Iran

Najafabad Persian: نجفاباد
- Village
- Location within Iran
- Coordinates: 35°23′59″N 50°29′41″E
- Country: Iran
- Province: Markazi
- County: Zarandiyeh
- District: Zaviyeh
- Rural District: Hakimabad

Population (2016)
  - Total: 162
- Time zone: UTC+3:30 (IRST)

Najafabad (Persian: نجفاباد) (Note: Also romanized as Najafābād; also known as Najimābād and Najmābād) is a village in Hakimabad Rural District of Zaviyeh District in Zarandiyeh County, Markazi province, Iran.

== Demographics ==
=== Population ===
At the time of the 2006 National Census, the village's population was 164 in 37 households, when it was in the Central District. The following census in 2011 counted 134 people in 39 households. The 2016 census measured the population of the village as 162 people in 49 households.

In 2021, the rural district was separated from the district in the formation of Zaviyeh District.
