= Musaabad, Zarandiyeh =

Village in Markazi province, Iran

Musaabad Persian: موسي اباد
- Village
- Location within Iran
- Coordinates: 35°20′33″N 50°30′47″E
- Country: Iran
- Province: Markazi
- County: Zarandiyeh
- District: Zaviyeh
- Rural District: Hakimabad

Population (2016)
  - Total: 272
- Time zone: UTC+3:30 (IRST)

Musaabad (Persian: موسي اباد) (Note: Also romanized as Mūsáābād) is a village in Hakimabad Rural District of Zaviyeh District in Zarandiyeh County, Markazi province, Iran.

== Demographics ==
=== Population ===
At the time of the 2006 National Census, the village's population was 281 in 71 households, when it was in the Central District. The following census in 2011 counted 272 people in 78 households. The 2016 census measured the population of the village as 272 people in 90 households.

In 2021, the rural district was separated from the district in the formation of Zaviyeh District.
