= Shurakabad =

Village in Markazi province, Iran

Shurakabad Persian: شورك اباد
- Village
- Location within Iran
- Coordinates: 35°21′37″N 50°33′36″E
- Country: Iran
- Province: Markazi
- County: Zarandiyeh
- District: Zaviyeh
- Rural District: Hakimabad

Population (2016)
  - Total: 23
- Time zone: UTC+3:30 (IRST)

Shurakabad (Persian: شورك اباد) (Note: Also romanized as Shūrakābād) is a village in Hakimabad Rural District of Zaviyeh District in Zarandiyeh County, Markazi province, Iran.

== Demographics ==
=== Population ===
At the time of the 2006 National Census, the village's population was 38 in 12 households, when it was in the Central District. The following census in 2011 counted 15 people in five households. The 2016 census measured the population of the village as 23 people in eight households.

In 2021, the rural district was separated from the district in the formation of Zaviyeh District.
