= Bidlu =

Bidlu (Persian: بيدلو) may refer to:

- Bidlu, East Azerbaijan
- Bidlu, Markazi
