= Aliabad, Khoshkrud =

Village in Markazi province, Iran

Aliabad Persian: علي اباد
- Village
- Location within Iran
- Coordinates: 35°18′57″N 50°11′25″E
- Country: Iran
- Province: Markazi
- County: Zarandiyeh
- District: Central
- Rural District: Khoshk Rud

Population (2016)
  - Total: 59
- Time zone: UTC+3:30 (IRST)

Aliabad (Persian: علي اباد) (Note: Also romanized as ‘Alīābād; also known as Qeshlāq-e ‘Alīābād and Qishlāq ‘Aliābād) is a village in Khoshk Rud Rural District of the Central District in Zarandiyeh County, Markazi province, Iran.

== Demographics ==
=== Population ===
At the time of the 2006 National Census, the village's population was 23 in six households. The following census in 2011 counted 18 people in six households. The 2016 census measured the population of the village as 59 people in 28 households.
