= Seyyedabad, Zarandiyeh =

Village in Markazi province, Iran

Seyyedabad Persian: سيداباد
- Village
- Location within Iran
- Coordinates: 35°19′59″N 50°12′58″E
- Country: Iran
- Province: Markazi
- County: Zarandiyeh
- District: Central
- Rural District: Khoshk Rud

Population (2016)
  - Total: 147
- Time zone: UTC+3:30 (IRST)

Seyyedabad (Persian: سيداباد) (Note: Also romanized as Seyyedābād; also known as Saīyīdābād) is a village in Khoshk Rud Rural District of the Central District in Zarandiyeh County, Markazi province, Iran.

== Demographics ==
=== Population ===
At the time of the 2006 National Census, the village's population was 56 in 23 households. The following census in 2011 counted 247 people in 63 households. The 2016 census measured the population of the village as 147 people in 51 households.
