= Amaniyeh =

Village in Markazi province, Iran

Amaniyeh Persian: امانيه
- Village
- Location within Iran
- Coordinates: 35°19′35″N 50°15′01″E
- Country: Iran
- Province: Markazi
- County: Zarandiyeh
- District: Central
- Rural District: Khoshk Rud

Population (2016)
  - Total: 182
- Time zone: UTC+3:30 (IRST)

Amaniyeh (Persian: امانيه) (Note: Also romanized as Āmānīyeh; formerly known as Khanabad (خان اباد), also romanized as Khānābād) is a village in Khoshk Rud Rural District of the Central District in Zarandiyeh County, Markazi province, Iran.

== Demographics ==
=== Population ===
At the time of the 2006 National Census, the village's population was 116 in 32 households. The following census in 2011 counted 116 people in 36 households. The 2016 census measured the population of the village as 182 people in 58 households.
