= Hoseynabad, Zarandiyeh =

Village in Markazi province, Iran

Hoseynabad Persian: حسين اباد
- Village
- Location within Iran
- Coordinates: 35°19′48″N 50°26′52″E
- Country: Iran
- Province: Markazi
- County: Zarandiyeh
- District: Central
- Rural District: Khoshk Rud

Population (2016)
  - Total: 1,678
- Time zone: UTC+3:30 (IRST)

Hoseynabad (Persian: حسين اباد) (Note: Also romanized as Ḩoseynābād; also known as Ḩoseynābād-e Zarand and Husainābād) is a village in Khoshk Rud Rural District of the Central District in Zarandiyeh County, Markazi province, Iran.

== Demographics ==
=== Population ===
At the time of the 2006 National Census, the village's population was 1,688 in 392 households. The following census in 2011 counted 1,589 people in 456 households. The 2016 census measured the population of the village as 1,678 people in 526 households, the most populous in its rural district.
