= Taqlidabad, Markazi =

Village in Markazi province, Iran

Taqlidabad Persian: تقلیدآباد
- Village
- Location within Iran
- Coordinates: 35°22′30″N 50°30′01″E
- Country: Iran
- Province: Markazi
- County: Zarandiyeh
- District: Zaviyeh
- Rural District: Hakimabad

Population (2016)
  - Total: 980
- Time zone: UTC+3:30 (IRST)

Taqlidabad (Persian: تقلیدآباد) (Note: Also romanized as Taqlīdābād) is a village in Hakimabad Rural District of Zaviyeh District in Zarandiyeh County, Markazi province, Iran.

== Demographics ==
=== Population ===
At the time of the 2006 National Census, the village's population was 1,023 in 251 households, when it was in the Central District. The following census in 2011 counted 990 people in 284 households. The 2016 census measured the population of the village as 980 people in 302 households.

In 2021, the rural district was separated from the district in the formation of Zaviyeh District.
