= Farajabad, Zarandiyeh =

Village in Markazi province, Iran

Farajabad Persian: فرج اباد
- Village
- Location within Iran
- Coordinates: 35°12′51″N 50°36′11″E
- Country: Iran
- Province: Markazi
- County: Zarandiyeh
- District: Central
- Rural District: Rudshur

Population (2016)
  - Total: 161
- Time zone: UTC+3:30 (IRST)

Farajabad (Persian: فرج اباد) (Note: Also romanized as Farajābād; also known as Farajābād-e Aḩmadlū) is a village in Rudshur Rural District of the Central District in Zarandiyeh County, Markazi province, Iran.

== Demographics ==
=== Population ===
At the time of the 2006 National Census, the village's population was 97 in 28 households. The following census in 2011 counted 157 people in 50 households. The 2016 census measured the population of the village as 161 people in 60 households.
