= Shur Bolagh, Markazi =

Village in Markazi province, Iran

Shur Bolagh Persian: شوربلاغ
- Village
- Location within Iran
- Coordinates: 35°33′18″N 50°21′51″E
- Country: Iran
- Province: Markazi
- County: Zarandiyeh
- District: Central
- Rural District: Khoshk Rud

Population (2016)
  - Total: 0
- Time zone: UTC+3:30 (IRST)

Shur Bolagh (Persian: شوربلاغ) (Note: Also romanized as Shūr Bolāgh) is a village in Khoshk Rud Rural District of the Central District in Zarandiyeh County, Markazi province, Iran.

== Demographics ==
=== Population ===
At the time of the 2006 National Census, the village's population was 26 in five households. The following census in 2011 counted 17 people in four households. The 2016 census measured the population of the village as zero.
