= Lalekan =

Village in Markazi province, Iran

Lalekan Persian: لالكان
- Village
- Location within Iran
- Coordinates: 35°17′43″N 50°15′31″E
- Country: Iran
- Province: Markazi
- County: Zarandiyeh
- District: Central
- Rural District: Khoshk Rud

Population (2016)
  - Total: 100
- Time zone: UTC+3:30 (IRST)

Lalekan (Persian: لالكان) (Note: Also romanized as Lālakān, Lālekān, and Lalkān; also known as Lālehkhan and Lāyekān) is a village in Khoshk Rud Rural District of the Central District in Zarandiyeh County, Markazi province, Iran.

== Demographics ==
=== Population ===
At the time of the 2006 National Census, the village's population was 26 in 11 households. The following census in 2011 counted 17 people in seven households. The 2016 census measured the population of the village as 100 people in 39 households.
