= Shirin Bolagh, Markazi =

Village in Markazi province, Iran

Shirin Bolagh Persian: شيرين بلاغ
- Village
- Location within Iran
- Coordinates: 35°18′54″N 50°49′50″E
- Country: Iran
- Province: Markazi
- County: Zarandiyeh
- District: Central
- Rural District: Rudshur

Population (2016)
  - Total: 0
- Time zone: UTC+3:30 (IRST)

Shirin Bolagh (Persian: شيرين بلاغ) (Note: Also romanized as Shīrīn Bolāgh; also known as Shīrīn Bulāgh) is a village in Rudshur Rural District of the Central District in Zarandiyeh County, Markazi province, Iran.

== Demographics ==
=== Population ===
At the time of the 2006 National Census, the village's population was 18 in four households. The following census in 2011 counted a population below the reporting threshold. The 2016 census measured the population of the village as zero.
