= Qasemabad, Zarandiyeh =

Village in Markazi province, Iran

Qasemabad-e Olya Persian: قاسماباد
- Village
- Location within Iran
- Coordinates: 35°22′06″N 50°30′18″E
- Country: Iran
- Province: Markazi
- County: Zarandiyeh
- District: Zaviyeh
- Rural District: Hakimabad

Population (2016)
  - Total: 584
- Time zone: UTC+3:30 (IRST)

Qasemabad (Persian: قاسماباد) (Note: Also romanized as Qāsemābād; formerly known as Qasemabad-e Olya (قاسمابادعليا), also romanized as Qāsemābād-e ‘Olyā) is a village in Hakimabad Rural District of Zaviyeh District in Zarandiyeh County, Markazi province, Iran.

== Demographics ==
=== Population ===
At the time of the 2006 National Census, the village's population, as Qasemabad-e Olya, was 587 in 177 households, when it was in the Central District. The following census in 2011 counted 686 people in 208 households. The 2016 census measured the population of the village as 584 people in 201 households, by which time the village was listed as Qasemabad.

In 2021, the rural district was separated from the district in the formation of Zaviyeh District.
