= Toraqan =

Village in Markazi province, Iran

Toraqan Persian: طراقان
- Village
- Location within Iran
- Country: Iran
- Province: Markazi
- County: Zarandiyeh
- District: Central
- Rural District: Khoshk Rud

Population (2016)
  - Total: 22
- Time zone: UTC+3:30 (IRST)

Toraqan (Persian: طراقان) (Note: Also romanized as Ţorāqān) is a village in Khoshk Rud Rural District of the Central District in Zarandiyeh County, Markazi province, Iran.

== Demographics ==
=== Population ===
At the time of the 2006 National Census, the village's population was 79 in 21 households. The following census in 2011 counted 38 people in 13 households. The 2016 census measured the population of the village as 22 people in seven households.
