= Darband-e Guyilagh =

Village in Markazi province, Iran

Darband-e Guyilagh Persian: دربند گويلاغ
- Village
- Location within Iran
- Coordinates: 35°10′34″N 50°48′46″E
- Country: Iran
- Province: Markazi
- County: Zarandiyeh
- District: Central
- Rural District: Rudshur

Population (2016)
  - Total: 10
- Time zone: UTC+3:30 (IRST)

Darband-e Guyilagh (Persian: دربند گويلاغ) (Note: Also romanized as Darband-e Gūyīlāgh; also known as Darband) is a village in Rudshur Rural District of the Central District in Zarandiyeh County, Markazi province, Iran.

== Demographics ==
=== Population ===
At the time of the 2006 National Census, the village's population was 16 in four households. The following census in 2011 counted 12 people in five households. The 2016 census measured the population of the village as 10 people in four households.
