= Soheyl Najafabad =

Village in Markazi province, Iran

Soheyl Najafabad Persian: سهيل نجف اباد
- Village
- Location within Iran
- Coordinates: 35°14′13″N 50°41′48″E
- Country: Iran
- Province: Markazi
- County: Zarandiyeh
- District: Central
- Rural District: Rudshur

Population (2016)
  - Total: 27
- Time zone: UTC+3:30 (IRST)

Soheyl Najafabad (Persian: سهيل نجف اباد) (Note: Also romanized as Soheyl Najafābād; also known as Najafābād, Qeshlāq-e Soheyl, Qeshlāq-e Soheyl Najafābād, and Soheyl) is a village in Rudshur Rural District of the Central District in Zarandiyeh County, Markazi province, Iran.

== Demographics ==
=== Population ===
At the time of the 2006 National Census, the village's population was 34 in eight households. The following census in 2011 counted 53 people in 19 households. The 2016 census measured the population of the village as 27 people in nine households.
