= Verdeh, Markazi =

Village in Markazi province, Iran

Verdeh Persian: ورده
- Village
- Location within Iran
- Coordinates: 35°14′39″N 50°15′30″E
- Country: Iran
- Province: Markazi
- County: Zarandiyeh
- District: Central
- Rural District: Khoshk Rud

Population (2016)
  - Total: 825
- Time zone: UTC+3:30 (IRST)

Verdeh (Persian: ورده) (Note: Also romanized as Vardeh; also known as Virdāi and Verdī) is a village in Khoshk Rud Rural District of the Central District in Zarandiyeh County, Markazi province, Iran.

== Demographics ==
=== Population ===
At the time of the 2006 National Census, the village's population was 562 in 163 households. The following census in 2011 counted 589 people in 188 households. The 2016 census measured the population of the village as 825 people in 278 households.
