= Soltan Ahmadlu =

Village in Markazi province, Iran

Soltan Ahmadlu Persian: سلطان احمدلو
- Village
- Location within Iran
- Coordinates: 35°15′32″N 50°46′12″E
- Country: Iran
- Province: Markazi
- County: Zarandiyeh
- District: Central
- Rural District: Rudshur

Population (2016)
  - Total: 190
- Time zone: UTC+3:30 (IRST)

Soltan Ahmadlu (Persian: سلطان احمدلو) (Note: Also romanized as Solţān Aḩmadlū; also known as Qeshlāq-e Aḩmadī) is a village in Rudshur Rural District of the Central District in Zarandiyeh County, Markazi province, Iran.

== Demographics ==
=== Population ===
At the time of the 2006 National Census, the village's population was 173 in 48 households. The following census in 2011 counted 145 people in 31 households. The 2016 census measured the population of the village as 190 people in 57 households, the most populous in its rural district.
