= Azad Kin =

Village in Markazi province, Iran

Azad Kin Persian: ازادكين
- Village
- Location within Iran
- Coordinates: 35°15′40″N 50°07′28″E
- Country: Iran
- Province: Markazi
- County: Zarandiyeh
- District: Central
- Rural District: Khoshk Rud

Population (2016)
  - Total: 206
- Time zone: UTC+3:30 (IRST)

Azad Kin (Persian: ازادكين) (Note: Also romanized as Āzād Kīn) is a village in Khoshk Rud Rural District of the Central District in Zarandiyeh County, Markazi province, Iran.

== Demographics ==
=== Population ===
At the time of the 2006 National Census, the village's population was 132 in 48 households. The following census in 2011 counted 45 people in 20 households. The 2016 census measured the population of the village as 206 people in 76 households.
