= Alvandabad =

Village in Markazi province, Iran

Alvandabad Persian: الوندآباد
- Village
- Location within Iran
- Coordinates: 35°20′37″N 50°45′10″E
- Country: Iran
- Province: Markazi
- County: Zarandiyeh
- District: Central
- Rural District: Rudshur

Population (2016)
  - Total: 0
- Time zone: UTC+3:30 (IRST)

Alvandabad (Persian: الوندآباد) (Note: Also romanized as Alvandābād) is a village in Rudshur Rural District of the Central District in Zarandiyeh County, Markazi province, Iran.

== Demographics ==
=== Population ===
At the time of the 2006 National Census, the village's population was 46 in 10 households. The following census in 2011 counted 36 people in 12 households. The 2016 census measured the population of the village as zero.
