= Qasemabad-e Sofla, Markazi =

Village in Markazi province, Iran

Qasemabad-e Sofla Persian: قاسم ابادسفلي
- Village
- Location within Iran
- Coordinates: 35°19′51″N 50°42′34″E
- Country: Iran
- Province: Markazi
- County: Zarandiyeh
- District: Central
- Rural District: Rudshur

Population (2016)
  - Total: 125
- Time zone: UTC+3:30 (IRST)

Qasemabad-e Sofla (Persian: قاسم ابادسفلي) (Note: Also romanized as Qāsemābād-e Soflá; also known as Qāsemābād) is a village in Rudshur Rural District of the Central District in Zarandiyeh County, Markazi province, Iran.

== Demographics ==
=== Population ===
At the time of the 2006 National Census, the village's population was 37 in seven households. The following census in 2011 counted 17 people in five households. The 2016 census measured the population of the village as 125 people in 43 households.
