= Kushkak, Zarandiyeh =

Village in Markazi province, Iran

Kushkak Persian: كوشكك
- Village
- Location within Iran
- Coordinates: 35°18′10″N 50°10′44″E
- Country: Iran
- Province: Markazi
- County: Zarandiyeh
- District: Central
- Rural District: Khoshk Rud

Population (2016)
  - Total: 136
- Time zone: UTC+3:30 (IRST)

Kushkak (Persian: كوشكك) (Note: Also romanized as Kūshkak; also known as Kushgāk) is a village in Khoshk Rud Rural District of the Central District in Zarandiyeh County, Markazi province, Iran.

== Demographics ==
=== Population ===
At the time of the 2006 National Census, the village's population was 78 in 26 households. The following census in 2011 counted 53 people in 20 households. The 2016 census measured the population of the village as 136 people in 56 households.
