= Malard, Markazi =

Village in Markazi province, Iran

Malard Persian: ملارد
- Village
- Location within Iran
- Coordinates: 35°17′22″N 50°20′47″E
- Country: Iran
- Province: Markazi
- County: Zarandiyeh
- District: Central
- Rural District: Khoshk Rud

Population (2016)
  - Total: 90
- Time zone: UTC+3:30 (IRST)

Malard (Persian: Malard) (Note: Also romanized as Malārd) is a village in Khoshk Rud Rural District of the Central District in Zarandiyeh County, Markazi province, Iran.

== Demographics ==
=== Population ===
At the time of the 2006 National Census, the village's population was 95 in 22 households. The following census in 2011 counted 73 people in 25 households. The 2016 census measured the population of the village as 90 people in 32 households.
