= Hakimabad, Markazi =

Village in Markazi province, Iran

Hakimabad Persian: حكيماباد
- Village
- Location within Iran
- Coordinates: 35°21′04″N 50°31′55″E
- Country: Iran
- Province: Markazi
- County: Zarandiyeh
- District: Zaviyeh
- Rural District: Hakimabad

Population (2016)
  - Total: 1,322
- Time zone: UTC+3:30 (IRST)

Hakimabad (Persian: حكيماباد) (Note: Also romanized as Ḩakīmābād and Hakīmābād) is a village in, and the capital of, Hakimabad Rural District in Zaviyeh District of Zarandiyeh County, Markazi province, Iran.

== Demographics ==
=== Population ===
At the time of the 2006 National Census, the village's population was 1,228 in 319 households, when it was in the Central District. The following census in 2011 counted 1,177 people in 344 households. The 2016 census measured the population of the village as 1,322 people in 420 households, the most populous in its rural district.

In 2021, the rural district was separated from the district in the formation of Zaviyeh District.
