= Franklin S. Harris =

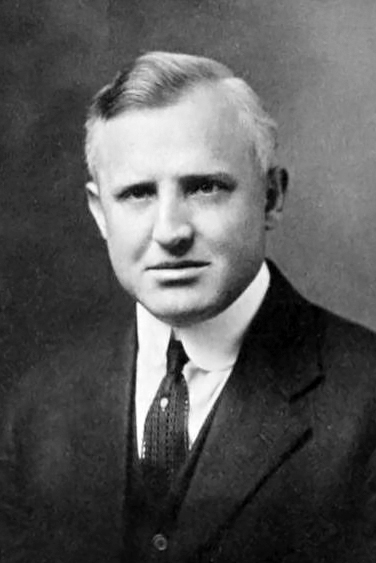
- Harris pictured in The Banyan 1923, BYU yearbook

President of Utah State University
- In office 1945–1950
- Preceded by: Elmer George Peterson
- Succeeded by: Louis Linden Madsen

President of Brigham Young University
- In office July 1921 – June 1945
- Preceded by: George H. Brimhall
- Succeeded by: Howard S. McDonald

Personal details
- Born: August 29, 1884 Benjamin, Utah, U.S.
- Died: April 18, 1960 (aged 75) Salt Lake City, Utah, U.S.

Franklin Stewart Harris (August 29, 1884 – April 18, 1960) was president of Brigham Young University (BYU) from 1921 to 1945, and president of Utah State Agricultural College (USAG) from 1945 to 1950. His administration was the longest in BYU history and saw the granting of the first master's degrees. Under his administration the school became an accredited university. He set up several colleges, such as the College of Fine and Performing Arts, with Gerrit De Jong as the founding dean. Harris was an agricultural scientist, holding a doctorate in agronomy from Cornell University. He had served as the agriculture department head and head of the experiment station at USAC and left BYU to become president of that institution. Harris also traveled to Russia and to Iran and other parts of the Middle East in order to provide expert advice on agriculture issues. The Harris Fine Arts Center on BYU's campus was named after him.

== Early life ==
Harris was born in Benjamin, Utah Territory, United States. In the 1890s, his family moved to the Mormon colonies in the Mexican state of Chihuahua. Harris did his early studies at BYU, taking a year to teach at USAC, before going on to receive his doctorate from Cornell.

After Cornell, Harris traveled back to Logan to become a professor of agronomy and an agronomist at USAC. In 1920, Harris was working as director of the USAC Experiment Station and was also head of its department of zoology and Entomology. Although he held these administrative positions at USAC and was already the president of the American Society of Agronomy, Harris accepted the offer of the Board of Trustees of the Church of Jesus Christ of Latter-day Saints (LDS Church) to become BYU's president on April 22, 1921. He was the first non-polygamous president of BYU.

== As president of a university ==
=== BYU ===
Before officially becoming president of BYU, Harris began to encourage college's development. He submitted a plan of organization that suggested adding the Extension and Research Division to the university, which was approved. He also began to recruit professors who had completed their doctorate degrees, along with well-known Latter-day Saints who were scholars to join the faculty at BYU. As president his first year, Harris hired five faculty members with PhDs and required all new faculty to possess at least a master's degree. Janet Jenson, author of The Many Lives of Franklin S. Harris, wrote: "The most significant and enduring accomplishment of Franklin S. Harris was his leadership in transforming what was essentially a high school with a small collegiate division into a university". Harris recognized that the combination of high school students and university students was hurting the scholarship of the college and organized the high school and college into separate buildings. His second year as president, Harris attempted to get BYU accredited with the Northwest Association of Secondary and Higher Schools; BYU became recognized as a four-year college but was not given the status of university. Harris then requested accreditation with the Association of American Universities, "but BYU failed to meet the criteria in student entrance requirements, coursework, faculty credentials, or research funds". In 1928, BYU was finally accepted as a member of the Association of American Universities.

Harris instituted special lectures on campus from LDS Church general authorities relating to a variety of different topics such as religion, science, and industry. He also instituted the school's radio program with extended broadcasting to all inter-mountain states. Harris contributed to the Improvement Era, the LDS Church magazine, along with other members of the BYU administration. He also took the initiative to visit different parts of the continental United States, along with Hawaii and other countries like Japan, in order to share information about his studies of soil alkali. Prompted by these trips, Harris extended his international experience in order to travel around the world for his expertise in agronomy. He not only shared his own educational knowledge at universities but gathered information about the practices of other educational institutions around the world. Harris believed that university education should prepare students for community leadership.

Harris oversaw the founding of the College of Fine Arts and viewed the enjoyment of the arts as vital to living a rich life. The first building constructed on the BYU campus during the administration of Harris was the Heber J. Grant building. Its first purpose was as the university's library. The building was dedicated in 1925. Harris wanted BYU to become a center of religious scholarship and advocated acquiring a broad spectrum of religious books in the library. Like the BYU presidents before him, Harris continued to differentiate and better organize the different collegiate subjects at the university and to separate the colleges, the normal school, and the training schools.

BYU continued to struggle financially through his presidency. This, coupled with the Great Depression in the 1930s, alienated Harris from the board of trustees, who were slow to approve funds to BYU. Instead of waiting, Harris would pay for campus expansions with the profits from the student bookstore without telling the board of trustees. Over time, Harris grew tired of debating with the board over financial programs he deemed important. He also struggled with J. Reuben Clark, who wanted a "purging of heretical faculty." Harris gave his resignation to the board in 1944 in order to become the president of USAC.

=== USAC ===
On November 20, 1944, Harris was offered the position of president at USAC. He met with the USAC board of trustees on November 25 to be appointed president effective July 1, 1945. Harris began his career at USAC with the difficult task of finding funds for new buildings. USAC buildings were old and run down, additionally, the influx of students attending USAC after World War II led to a space problem as capacity was already limited on campus. With World War II ending, Harris was able to acquire temporary buildings from military bases that were being dismantled. In 1948, he received approval from the board to rent Cache Valley Hospital as a dorm. Harris also worked to provide new, permanent buildings on campus. He continued to follow his agronomist pursuits and in 1950 he spent the month of January as a consultant to the United States State Department. Harris continued as USAC's president until 1955.

== Politics ==
In 1938, friends of Harris encouraged him to run for the United States Senate. He started campaigning when J. Reuben Clark told him the LDS Church's First Presidency wanted Harris to run. With fall approaching and school starting again Harris had little time to campaign, however, he won the primary election and became the Republican candidate for senator. Harris ran on an anti-New Deal platform. He eventually lost the election to Elbert D. Thomas.

Harris ran for governor of Utah in 1948. He won the third most votes at the Republican state convention but did not make it to the primary ticket. By August he decided to give his support to Charles Rendell Mabey, another candidate running for governor at the time.

== Other LDS Church service ==
In June 1925, Harris was made a member of the General Board of the Young Men's Mutual Improvement Association (YMMIA) and remained affiliated with it until November 1948. He served as a missionary in Japan in 1926. The following year he served a short mission among the Latter-day Saints in Syria. After returning from foreign trips, Harris would often speak in LDS Church sacrament meetings detailing his experiences. Harris was never a general authority, but he was given an assigned seat with his name on it to attend general conference. His church service was often combined with his job as president of BYU. He often taught religious classes and attended church school conventions. On his second trip to Iran in 1950, Harris became the branch president in Tehran. The branch started out with nine members but eventually reached thirty-five individuals.

== International work ==
=== Russia ===
The Organization for Jewish Colonization in Russia (Yidishe Kolonizatsye Organizatsye in Rusland = ICOR) was established by pro-Soviet Americans in order to develop agricultural settlements in Soviet territory specifically for Jews. In 1928 one of the journalists involved with the ICOR, Leon Talmy, invited Franklin Harris to Russia in order to evaluate the area of Birobidzhan where the creation of a Jewish autonomous district had just been approved. In 1929, Harris traveled to the Soviet Union as chairman of a commission appraising the territory. In July 1929 the commission began searching in Birobidzhan to see if it could agriculturally sustain a large population. Harris spent two months "evaluating the territory for agricultural development." The commission met with Alexei Rykov, chairman of the Council of Ministers as well as Jewish community leaders. Upon Harris' return to the United States, he traveled back to Utah by train in order to stop and speak in many cities about Birobidzhan and rally support for its progress. Harris wrote to Talmy for a time but eventually lost touch. He "regarded his trip to Birobidzhan as a highlight of his professional career." The commission's work on the agricultural potential of Birobidzhan would later help in forming the Jewish Autonomous Oblast in 1934.

=== Iran ===
In March 1939, Harris was asked by the United States Department of Agriculture to consider working with the Iranian government in order to reorganize Iran's Department of Agriculture. Harris and his wife left for Iran the next month. Upon arrival, Harris became the agricultural adviser to the Shah, Reza Shah, and the Iran government in 1939. Harris' first project was to inspect the structure and performance of the agricultural college in Karaj. He also studied Iran's forestry problem while working to improve Iran's Department of Agriculture. After a year contract Harris returned to Provo to manage BYU as its president. His relationships in Iran attracted Iranian students to the United States and specifically to Utah to study.

On March 10, 1950, Harris was asked by the Office of Foreign Agricultural Relations of the United States Department of Agriculture if he would be head the United States international technical collaboration program part of Truman's Point Four program in Iran. That July Harris and his wife returned to Iran where he worked in the United States embassy and at the Iranian Ministry of Agriculture. Esfahanak, Markazi was chosen as the first demonstration site for the Point Four program. The village of Esfahanak had continually struggled in agriculture, education, and health. A drain was dug to reduce mosquito-breeding water and old buildings were repaired to become schools. In 1951 Harris helped relocate funds from the Point Four program for emergency aid as a large plague of locusts couldn't be controlled through local methods. The Point Four program created confusion as to who was supposed to oversee work in Iran. Harris became the program's technical director and worked to get the Point Four program operating. Of Harris' two-year contract in Iran it took a year to sign the Point Four program into action.

Harris also served as the president of the LDS Church branch headquartered in Tehran, as reported in the October 1951 general conference.

=== Middle East ===
In 1945, Harris was asked to lead a three-man mission to the Middle East by the United States Department of State and Agriculture. The purpose of the mission was to help survey foreign agricultural situations and provide "American agricultural experience" to the Middle East. The first stop was Egypt where the group focused on diplomatic activities. The mission traveled through Palestine, Lebanon, Syria, Saudi Arabia, Iraq, and Greece surveying agricultural conditions. Back in the United States Harris gave a speech to the Institute of World Affairs in December 1948 where he addressed his recommendations for Middle Eastern advancement. He believed educating the area's population on agricultural improvement would sustain agriculture in these countries as well as provide new developments to maintain and preserve water.

== Later years, death, and legacy ==
At age 65, in 1949, Harris attempted to retire as president of USAC, however, the board asked him to stay one more year. By the end of the next year Harris had agreed to return to Iran in order to implement the Point Four program. He was 68 when he officially retired. Board of trustee members and BYU presidents sought his advice in his later years. Harris had a mild stroke the day after Christmas 1954 and in January 1956 experienced another. This ended his public career after which he kept mostly to himself and family. He suffered another stroke in 1960 and died seven days later on April 18.

=== Legacy ===
In his third year as BYU president he was awarded the "Supreme Honor Man of the Student Body" by the student body president. As a gift, the graduating class of 1935 commissioned his portrait to be painted by Lee Greene Richards. In 1964, the Franklin S. Harris Fine Arts Center was inaugurated and named after Harris because of his support for the Fine Arts while president of BYU. After his twenty-four years as president of BYU, Harris also became known as "Mr. BYU." During BYU's 1998 Homecoming week on Founders Day, October 6, Harris was honored as the "right man."

== Publications ==
Some of the publications of Franklin S. Harris from the BYU library catalogue.

- Effects of variations of moisture content on certain properties of soil and on the growth of wheat, 1914
- The Principles of Agronomy, 1915
- The Young Man and His Vocation, 1916
- The Sugar Beet in America, 1918
- Soil Alkali, 1920
- Scientific Research and Human Welfare, 1924
- Heroes of science, 1926
- A Book of Mormon bibliography, 1936
- A critical study of the apparatus used by Beniams in his study of the emission of positive ions from heated filaments coated with metallic salts, 1936
- College values in retrospect, 1953
- The farmers of Iran, 1954.
- Others kept records on metal plates too, 1957

He also wrote articles for scientific journals and contributed bulletins to the Agricultural Experiment Station.

Party political offices
| Preceded by Reed Smoot | Republican nominee for U.S. Senator from Utah (Class 3); 1938 | Succeeded by Adam S. Bennion |
Academic offices
| Preceded by Elmer George Peterson | President of Utah State University; 1945–1950 | Succeeded by Louis Linden Madsen |
| Preceded by George H. Brimhall | President of Brigham Young University; July 1921 – June 1945 | Succeeded by Howard S. McDonald |
