= Brad L. Mortensen =

American educator and university administrator

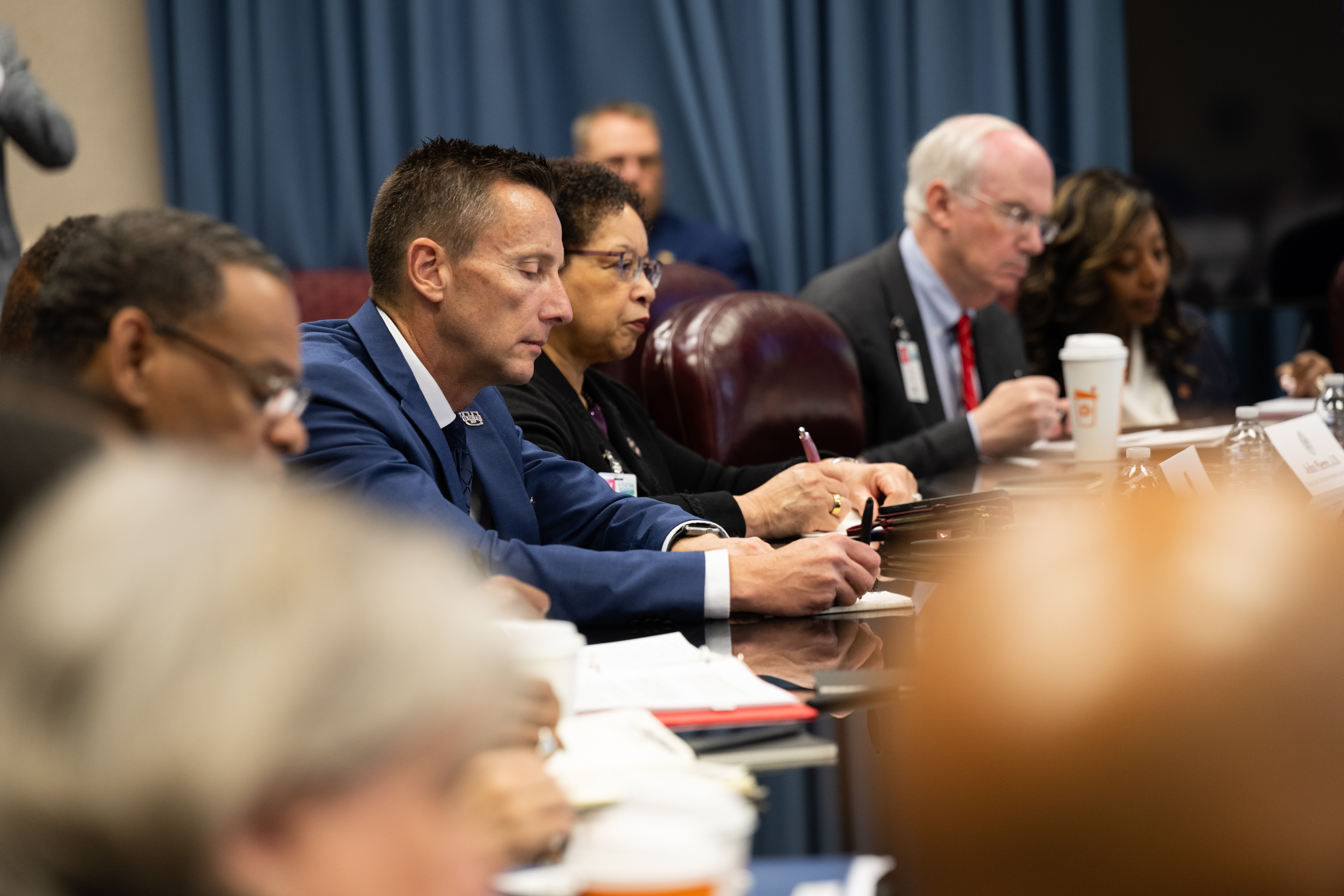
- Mortensen in 2025

18th President of Utah State University
- Incumbent
- Assumed office November 10, 2025
- Preceded by: Elizabeth R. Cantwell

President of Weber State University
- In office 2018–2025
- Preceded by: Charles A. Wight
- Succeeded by: TBD

Personal details
- Born: October 23, 1970 (age 56) Idaho, USA
- Spouse: Camille Mortensen
- Children: 4
- Education: Brigham Young University–Idaho (AA); Utah State University (BA); Syracuse University (MPA); University of Utah (PhD)
- Occupation: University administrator

Brad Leon Mortensen (born October 1, 1970) is an American educator and university administrator who currently serves as the 18th president of Utah State University. He previously served as president of Weber State University from 2018 to 2025. A first-generation college graduate, Mortensen earned degrees from Brigham Young University–Idaho, Utah State University, Syracuse University, and the University of Utah.

== Early life and education ==
Mortensen is a first-generation college student and a native of Idaho, where three generations of his family lived before relocating to Cache Valley, Utah. He began his higher education journey by earning an associate degree from Brigham Young University–Idaho (then known as Ricks College) in 1993. He later transferred to Utah State University, where he earned a bachelor's degree in political science in 1995. Mortensen went on to receive a master's degree in public administration from Syracuse University and a Ph.D. in educational leadership and policy from the University of Utah. He has credited his parents, Leon and Barbara Mortensen, for encouraging him and his brothers to pursue higher education so they would "never be locked out from any opportunity."

== Career ==
Mortensen began his tenure at Weber State University in 2004, serving for 11 years as vice president for university advancement, overseeing fundraising, alumni relations, and community partnerships. He was appointed Weber State’s 13th president in December 2018, following the departure of Charles A. Wight.

As president, Mortensen emphasized affordability, innovation, and access to higher education. Under his leadership, Weber State launched Utah’s first accelerated bachelor’s degree programs and created the Miller Advanced Research and Solutions (MARS) Center in partnership with the Utah Legislature, the United States Air Force, and the aerospace and defense industry. He also established new graduate programs, including the Doctor of Nursing Practice, and led a fundraising effort that secured nearly $400 million for academic, athletic, and research facilities.

During his presidency, Weber State reached record enrollment in 2023 with more than 30,000 students, including the university’s highest-ever percentage of Hispanic and Latino students at 13 percent. Mortensen also oversaw institutional restructuring in response to Utah House Bill 261, consolidating the university’s diversity, equity, and inclusion initiatives into a new Student Success Center designed to provide personalized coaching and academic support.

On October 30, 2025, the Utah Board of Higher Education unanimously selected Mortensen as the 18th president of Utah State University. He officially assumed the role on November 10, 2025, succeeding interim president Alan L. Smith. At his appointment, Mortensen described returning to his alma mater as “beyond any dream” for a first-generation college graduate and reaffirmed his commitment to student success and research-driven innovation.

== Awards and honors ==
Under Mortensen’s leadership, Weber State University received multiple recognitions for affordability and return on investment for graduates. He was credited by the Utah Board of Higher Education for advancing innovative programs, expanding dual-enrollment opportunities, and securing nearly $400 million to improve academic, athletic, and research facilities. During his tenure, Weber State achieved record enrollment of more than 30,000 students and was repeatedly recognized for its inclusive and affordable education model.

== Personal life ==
Mortensen is married to Camille Mortensen, and they have four children. He has spoken publicly about his parents' encouragement to pursue higher education and often emphasizes the importance of family and community in his leadership philosophy.

== Publications ==
- Mortensen, B. L. (2012). Emerging governance in state-level higher education: Competing pressures and models (Doctoral dissertation). University of Utah. ERIC ED533279.

Preceded by Elizabeth R. Cantwell	President of Utah State University; November 10, 2025 – present	Succeeded by Incumbent
