= Cazier =

Cazier is a surname. Notable people with the surname include:

- Marie-Christine Cazier (born 1963), French sprinter
- Stanford Cazier (1930–2013), American university administrator
