= Qasemabad-e Olya =

Qasemabad-e Olya or Qasemabad Olya (Persian: قاسمابادعليا) may refer to:

- Qasemabad-e Olya, Fars
- Qasemabad-e Olya, Gilan
- Qasemabad-e Olya, Markazi
