= Hibran =

Hibran or Hebran may refer to the following places:

- Hebran (composer), 16th century French composer
- Hibran, Iran, a village in northern Iran
- Hibran, Syria, a village in southern Syria
