= Hebran, Iran =

Village in Markazi province, Iran

Hebran Persian: هبران
- Village
- Location within Iran
- Coordinates: 35°15′03″N 50°09′49″E
- Country: Iran
- Province: Markazi
- County: Zarandiyeh
- District: Central
- Rural District: Khoshk Rud

Population (2016)
  - Total: 73
- Time zone: UTC+3:30 (IRST)

Hebran (Persian: هبران) (Note: Also romanized as Habaran and Hebrān; also known as Hībrān and Mīānī) is a village in Khoshk Rud Rural District of the Central District in Zarandiyeh County, Markazi province, Iran.

== Demographics ==
=== Population ===
At the time of the 2006 National Census, the village's population was 36 in 13 households. The following census in 2011 counted 77 people in 25 households. The 2016 census measured the population of the village as 73 people in 27 households.
