= Taqlidabad =

Taqlidabad (Persian: تقلیدآباد) may refer to:

- Taqlidabad, Markazi
- Taqlidabad, West Azerbaijan
