= Esfahanak, Markazi =

Village in Markazi province, Iran

Esfahanak Persian: اصفهانك
- Village
- Location within Iran
- Country: Iran
- Province: Markazi
- County: Zarandiyeh
- District: Central
- Rural District: Khoshk Rud

Population (2016)
  - Total: 162
- Time zone: UTC+3:30 (IRST)

Esfahanak (Persian: اصفهانك) (Note: Also romanized as Eşfahānak and Isfahānak) is a village in Khoshk Rud Rural District of the Central District in Zarandiyeh County, Markazi province, Iran.

== Demographics ==
=== Population ===
At the time of the 2006 National Census, the village's population was 36 in 10 households. The following census in 2011 counted 13 people in six households. The 2016 census measured the population of the village as 162 people in 48 households.
