= Rudshur Rural District =

Rural district in Markazi province, Iran

Rudshur Rural District Persian: دهستان رودشور
- Rural District
- Location within Iran
- Coordinates: 35°18′N 50°45′E
- Country: Iran
- Province: Markazi
- County: Zarandiyeh
- District: Central
- Established: 1987
- Capital: Parandak

Population (2016)
  - Total: 826
- Time zone: UTC+3:30 (IRST)

Rudshur Rural District (Persian: دهستان رودشور) is in the Central District of Zarandiyeh County, Markazi province, Iran. It is administered from the city of Parandak. (Note: Formerly Rahimabad) It is the location of Rudshur power plant, a 2162 MW gas-powered electrical plant off the Saveh–Tehran freeway.

== Demographics ==
=== Population ===
At the time of the 2006 National Census, the rural district's population was 854 in 234 households. There were 843 inhabitants in 228 households at the following census of 2011. The 2016 census measured the population of the rural district as 826 in 273 households. The most populous of its 50 villages was Soltan Ahmadlu, with 190 people.

=== Other villages in the rural district ===
- Alvandabad
- Darband-e Guyilagh
- Farajabad
- Peyk
- Qasemabad-e Sofla
- Shirin Bolagh
- Soheyl Najafabad
- Soltanabad
