= Louis L. Madsen =

8th President of Utah State University
- In office 1953–1954
- Preceded by: Franklin S. Harris
- Succeeded by: Henry Aldous Dixon

Personal details
- Education: Utah State University (B.A.); Cornell University (Ph.D.)

Louis Linden Madsen (September 29, 1907 – May 18, 1986) was an American agricultural scientist who served as president of Utah State University from 1950 to 1953 and later as a member of the Washington State University faculty.

== Biography ==
Madsen was born in Salt Lake City, Utah. He received his bachelor's degree at Utah State Agricultural College (now Utah State University). He then received a Ph.D. from Cornell University in 1934.

Prior to taking the position as president of Utah State, Madsen was an employee of the United States Department of Agriculture. Madsen succeeded Franklin S. Harris as president of Utah State.

Several papers co-authored by Madsen relating to diseases in cattle were published in the Journal of Animal Science.

Madsen's removal as president of Utah State lead to protests by the students.

From 1957 to 1973, Madsen was a member of the State of Washington Board of Natural Resources.

=== Personal life ===
Madsen was a Latter-day Saint. Among his children was John M. Madsen, who was a general authority of the Church of Jesus Christ of Latter-day Saints.
