= Parandak, Markazi =

City in Markazi province, Iran

Parandak Persian: پرندک
- City
- Location within Iran
- Coordinates: 35°21′40″N 50°40′56″E
- Country: Iran
- Province: Markazi
- County: Zarandiyeh
- District: Central

Government
  - Mayor: Baqir Imani
- Elevation: 1,190 m (3,900 ft)

Population (2016)
  - Total: 6,886
- Time zone: UTC+3:30 (IRST)
- Area code: 864
- Website: shahrdariparandak.ir

Parandak (Persian: پرندک) (Note: Formerly Rahimabad (رَحيم‌آباد),) is a city in the Central District of Zarandiyeh County, Markazi province, Iran, serving as the administrative center for Rudshur Rural District.

== Demographics ==
=== Language ===
The city's people speak Persian.

=== Population ===
At the time of the 2006 National Census, the city's population was 6,184 in 1,631 households. The following census in 2011 counted 6,633 people in 1,948 households. The 2016 census measured the population of the city as 6,886 people in 2,193 households.

== Representative of Velayat-e Faqih ==
Hojatoleslam and Muslims Sayyid Hassan Muhammadi Imam Jomeh Parandak City.
