= George H. Emert =

American academic administrator (1938–2018)

13th President of Utah State University
- In office July 1, 1992 – December 31, 2000
- Preceded by: Stan Cazier
- Succeeded by: Kermit L. Hall

Personal details
- Born: December 15, 1938 Sevier County, Tennessee
- Died: March 21, 2018 (aged 79) Skagit County, Washington

George H. Emert (December 15, 1938 – March 21, 2018) was an American academic administrator who served as president of Utah State University from 1992 to 2000.

He was born in Sevier County, Tennessee, on December 15, 1938, to Victor and Hazel Emert Ridley. Emert graduated from Morristown High School, then attended Lincoln Memorial University. Emert completed his undergraduate degree in 1962 at the University of Colorado, then served in the Vietnam War from 1963 to 1966 with the U.S. Army Special Forces. He received the Air Medal and Bronze Star. Emert later earned his master's and doctoral degrees from Colorado State University and Virginia Tech, respectively. He worked for the Gulf Oil Corporation and taught microbiology at the University of Kansas as an adjunct assistant professor until 1979, when he joined the faculty of the University of Arkansas. There, Emert met James E. Martin, who became president of Auburn University in 1984, and named Emert the executive vice president. Emert left Auburn to assume the presidency at Utah State, stepping down in 2000. In retirement, Emert lived in Bellingham, Washington, and Skagit County, where he died on March 21, 2018.
