= Stan L. Albrecht =

American educator and university administrator

15th President of Utah State University
- In office 2005–2016
- Preceded by: Kermit L. Hall
- Succeeded by: Noelle E. Cockett

Personal details
- Born: Stan LeRoy Albrecht; July 13, 1942 (age 83)
- Education: Southern Utah State College; Brigham Young University (BA); Washington State University (MA, PhD)

Stan LeRoy Albrecht (born July 13, 1942) is an American educator, university administrator, and scholar. He served as the president of Utah State University (USU) from 2005 to 2016.

== Early life and education ==
Albrecht was raised on a farm near Fremont in Wayne County, Utah. Albrecht began college as an undergraduate student at Southern Utah State College (now known as Southern Utah University), later transferring to Brigham Young University (BYU). Albrecht initially majored in veterinary science, but soon switched to political science and history before settling on sociology. Albrecht completed both his master's and doctorate degrees in sociology from Washington State University.

== Career ==
Albrecht's got his first teaching position at USU in 1970. Shortly after, he accepted a faculty position at BYU where he worked for over twenty years. During his tenure at BYU, Albrecht served as a professor, department head, dean, academic vice president, and associate provost. Albrecht later accepted a research position as associate director of the epidemiological research center at the University of Florida College of Medicine. He became Dean of the College of Humanities, Arts, and Social Sciences at USU in 1998, serving until 2001, when he was named provost of the university. Albrecht was appointed president of USU on February 1, 2005.

Albrecht took office during a period of turmoil at Utah State, highlighted by a van accident which killed eight students and a faculty member returning from an agricultural research trip. During his tenure, he raised major funds for the improvement of USU's statewide Regional Campus system. He oversaw an increase in enrollment, added the Energy Dynamics Lab and a new college, and built numerous additional facilities on and around campus. Albrecht initiated a $400 million fundraising campaign in 2007. The initial goal of $200 million was reached within one year the goal was doubled and the campaign extended to 2012.

Albrecht retired as president in 2016, and was succeeded by Noelle E. Cockett, a genetic researcher and first female president of USU. Cockett officially assumed the role in January 2017.

In retirement, he has held various roles, including being named a member of the Executive Advisory Board of Utah's new Medical School of Osteopathy, Rocky Vista University in 2017.

Albrecht at one point was a member of the Church of Jesus Christ of Latter-day Saints but later left the religion.

== Awards and honors ==
- Stan L. Albrecht Agricultural Science Building which serves as the College of Agriculture and Applied Science's headquarters at USU is named in his honor.

== Notes ==
Preceded by Kermit L. Hall	President of Utah State University; February 1, 2005–2017	Succeeded by Noelle E. Cockett
