= Mamuniyeh =

City in Markazi province, Iran

Mamuniyeh Persian: مامونيه
- City
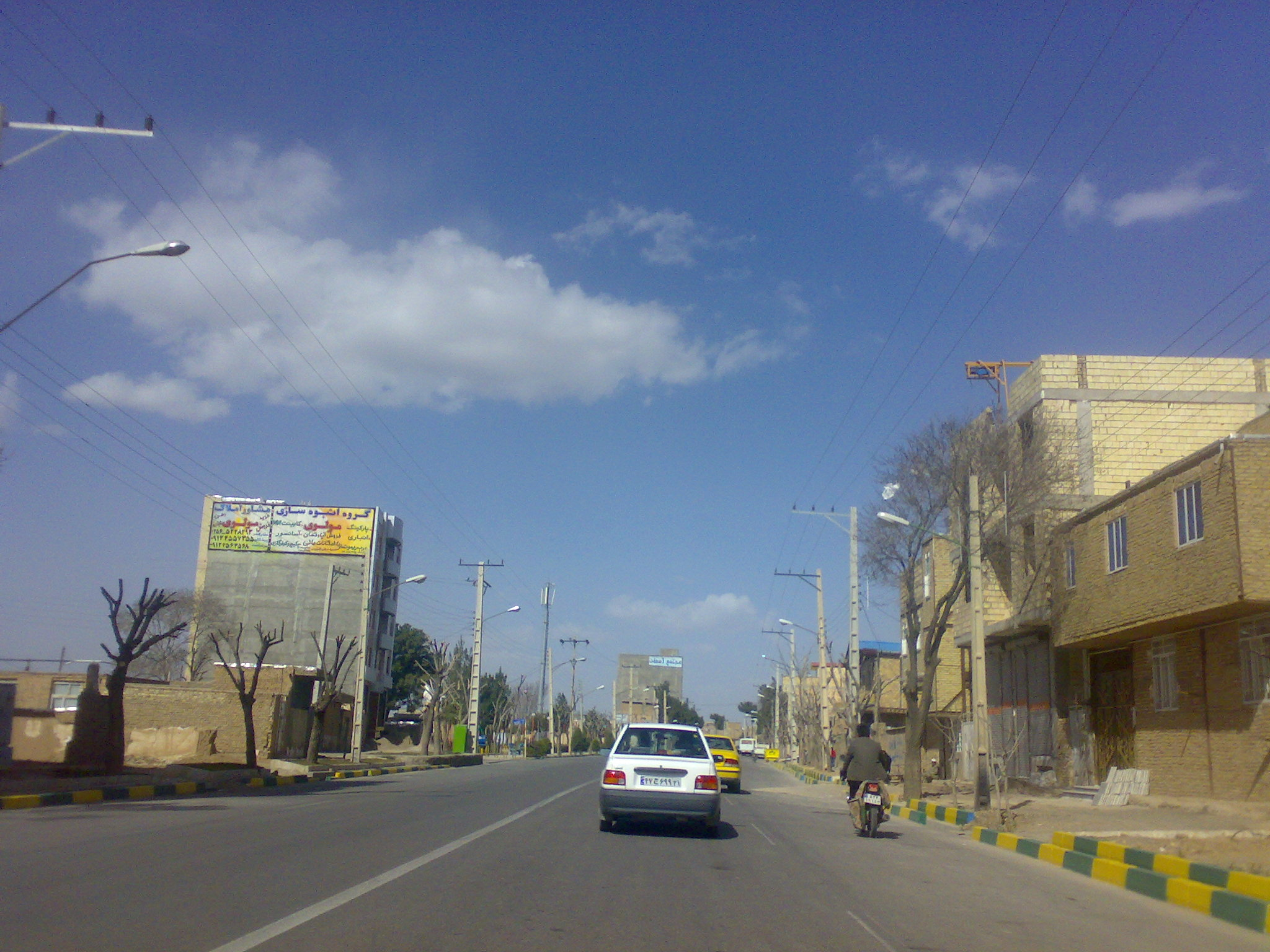
- Street in Manuniyeh

- Location within Iran
- Coordinates: 35°18′18″N 50°29′51″E
- Country: Iran
- Province: Markazi
- County: Zarandiyeh
- District: Central

Population (2016)
  - Total: 21,814
- Time zone: UTC+3:30 (IRST)

Mamuniyeh (Persian: مامونيه) (Note: Also romanized as Ma’mūnīyeh) is a city in the Central District of Zarandiyeh County, Markazi province, Iran, serving as capital of both the county and the district.

== Demographics ==
=== Population ===
At the time of the 2006 National Census, the city's population was 17,337 in 4,672 households. The following census in 2011 counted 19,005 people in 5,732 households. The 2016 census measured the population of the city as 21,814 people in 6,947 households.

== Notable people ==
Musa Farzaneh was a well-known philanthropist, educator, and highly respected public figure of Mamuniyeh. He was of Mirza Hakim Yazdi descent from the city of Yazd, who made Mamuniyeh his home. His vision, love and dedication, in addition to his significant contributions in both education and development, brought many of the modern infrastructures and amenities to the community, resulting in the prosperity of the city as well as the county.
