= John M. Madsen =

Second Quorum of the Seventy
- June 6, 1992 – April 5, 1997
- Called by: Ezra Taft Benson
- End reason: Transferred to First Quorum of the Seventy

First Quorum of the Seventy
- April 5, 1997 – October 3, 2009
- Called by: Gordon B. Hinckley
- End reason: Granted general authority emeritus status

Emeritus General Authority
- October 3, 2009
- Called by: Thomas S. Monson

Personal details
- Born: John Max Madsen; April 24, 1939 (age 87); Washington, D.C., United States

John Max Madsen (born April 24, 1939) has been a general authority of the Church of Jesus Christ of Latter-day Saints (LDS Church) since 1992.

Madsen's father, Louis L. Madsen, was an employee of the US Department of Agriculture, at the time of his birth. When he was six his family moved to Logan, Utah where his father was a professor at and later president of Utah State University. Madsen was later raised in Pullman, Washington. He served as an LDS Church missionary in the North Central State Mission from 1959 to 1961. He earned a bachelor's degree at Washington State University, majoring in zoology and minoring in chemistry.

Madsen had planned to go to dental school but instead became a seminary teacher and spent much of his career with the Church Educational System (CES). In 1968, Madsen was sent to England as the first seminary teacher to work there. For a time, Madsen served as a CES coordinator in England. He also served as an institute instructor and later as a religion professor at Brigham Young University (BYU). Madsen earned both master's and Ed.D. degrees from BYU. Madsen was later an LDS Church employee, serving in the Melchizedek Priesthood Department and other administrative roles. He was among the contributors to the 1992 Encyclopedia of Mormonism.

Prior to his call as a general authority, Madsen served in the LDS Church as a regional representative and as president of the England Southwest Mission (1970 to 1973). He also served as a member of the Young Men General Board and as a stake mission president. In 1992, Madsen became a member of the Second Quorum of the Seventy, and in 1997 he was transferred to the First Quorum of the Seventy.

As a general authority, Madsen's assignments included serving as president of the church's Mexico North Area, and in the presidency of the North America West, North America Northwest, Philippines, and Australia/New Zealand areas. He also served in the general presidency of the church's Young Men organization, after previously being as a member of the organization's general board.

Madsen was designated as an emeritus general authority at the church's October 2009 general conference.
