= Khoshkrud, Markazi =

City in Markazi province, Iran

Khoshkrud Persian: خشكرود
- City
- Location within Iran
- Coordinates: 35°23′55″N 50°20′02″E
- Country: Iran
- Province: Markazi
- County: Zarandiyeh
- District: Central
- Established as a city: 2007

Population (2016)
  - Total: 5,246
- Time zone: UTC+3:30 (IRST)

Khoshkrud (Persian: خشكرود) (Note: Also romanized as Khoshkrūd; also known as Khoshg Rood, Khoshkeh Rūd, and Kūshkarūt) is a city in the Central District of Zarandiyeh County, Markazi province, Iran, serving as the administrative center for Khoshk Rud Rural District.

== Demographics ==
=== Population ===
At the time of the 2006 National Census, Khoshkrud's population was 6,059 in 1,249 households, when it was a village in Khoshk Rud Rural District. The following census in 2011 counted 5,019 people in 1,407 households, by which time the village had been converted to a city. The 2016 census measured the population of the city as 5,246 people in 1,567 households.
