= Glen L. Taggart =

11th President of Utah State University
- In office 1968–1979
- Preceded by: Daryl Chase
- Succeeded by: Stanford Cazier

Glen L. Taggart (1914–1997) was the second Vice Chancellor of the University of Nigeria, Nsukka whose approach was that of respect to the respective culture of the host University rather than modeling it rigidly after the American style. He was also the 11th president of Utah State University from 1968 to 1979.
