= Zaviyeh =

City in Markazi province, Iran

Zaviyeh Persian: زاويه
- City
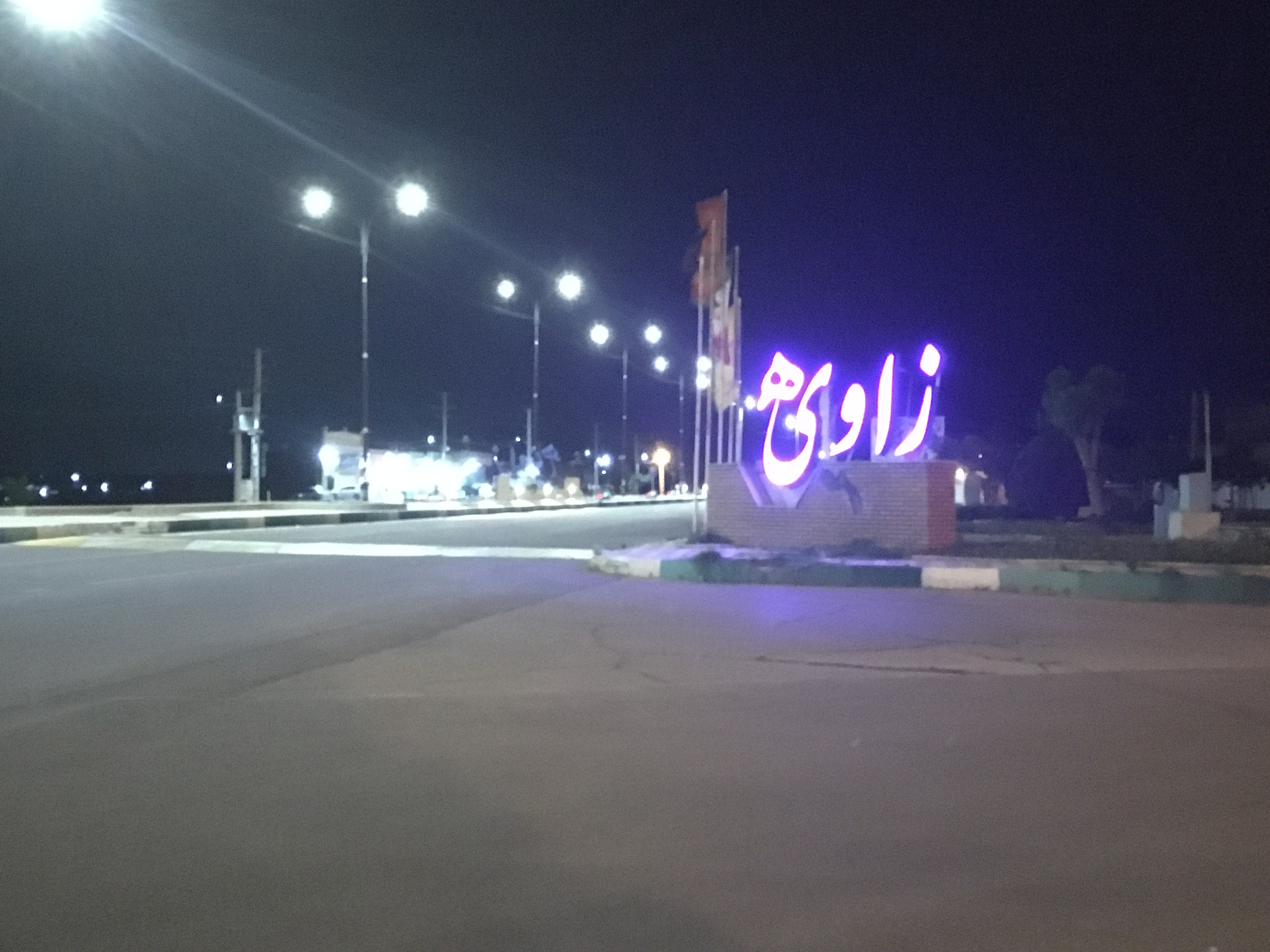
- Entrance to the city of Zaviyeh

- Location within Iran
- Coordinates: 35°22′48″N 50°34′10″E
- Country: Iran
- Province: Markazi
- County: Zarandiyeh
- District: Zaviyeh

Population (2016)
  - Total: 6,027
- Time zone: UTC+3:30 (IRST)

Zaviyeh (Persian: زاويه) (Note: Also romanized as Zāvīyeh and Zāvyeh; also known as Shahr-e Zāvīyeh and Zārīyeh) is a city in, and the capital of, Zaviyeh District of Zarandiyeh County, Markazi province, Iran.

== Demographics ==
=== Population ===
At the time of the 2006 National Census, the city's population was 6,141 in 1,624 households, when it was in the Central District. The following census in 2011 counted 5,877 people in 1,692 households. The 2016 census measured the population of the city as 6,027 people in 1,880 households.

In 2021, the city was separated from the district in the formation of Zaviyeh District.
