= Kermit L. Hall =

American legal historian (1944–2006)

- Born: August 31, 1944; Akron, Ohio, U.S.
- Died: August 13, 2006 (aged 61); Hilton Head Island, South Carolina, U.S.
- Education: University of Akron (BA); Syracuse University (MA); University of Minnesota (PhD); Yale Law School (MSL)
- Spouse: Phyllis
- Scientific career
- Fields: Legal historian

Kermit Lance Hall (August 31, 1944 – August 13, 2006) was a noted legal historian and university president. He served from 1994 to 1998 on the Assassination Records Review Board to review and release to the public documents related to the assassination of U.S. President John F. Kennedy.

== Biography ==
Hall was raised in Akron, Ohio. His father, Kermit, was a tire builder, and his mother, Katherine, a bookkeeper. He was a Vietnam era veteran. He earned his bachelor's degree from the University of Akron and master's degree in 1967 from Syracuse University. He earned his Ph.D. degree from the University of Minnesota in 1972. He also received a Master of Studies in Law (MSL) degree from Yale Law School in 1980.

Over the course of his career, Hall held academic positions in the history departments at Vanderbilt University, Wayne State University, and University of Florida. In 1992, Hall began a rapid ascent in higher education administration that included appointments at University of Tulsa, Ohio State University, and North Carolina State University. He served as president of Utah State University from 2000 to 2005, and in early 2005 he became the seventeenth president of the State University of New York at Albany. During a distinguished career as a scholar, he wrote six books and edited twenty-two, including the award-winning The Oxford Companion to the Supreme Court (second ed., rev. 2005), The Magic Mirror: Law in American History (1989), A Comprehensive Bibliography of American Constitutional and Legal History (1984), and The Politics of Justice: Lower Federal Judicial Selection and the Second Party System, 1829-1861 (1979). He served on numerous editorial boards and edited several book series, including Bicentennial Essays on the Bill of Rights published by Oxford University Press.

He received fellowships and grants from the National Endowment for the Humanities, the American Council of Learned Societies, and the American Bar Foundation. In 1993, President Bill Clinton appointed him to the Assassination Records Review Board, which reviewed and eventually released tens of thousands of documents pertaining to the death of President John F. Kennedy. After the board completed its work, Hall received in 1999 the James Madison Award from the American Library Association for his commitment to openness in government. In recent years, Hall assumed the role of public intellectual. A frequent lecturer in both the U.S. and abroad, he provided expert commentary to the national media about the history of the U.S. Constitution and the Supreme Court.

Hall died of a heart attack on August 13, 2006, while swimming on vacation on Hilton Head Island, South Carolina. He was 61 years old.

A remembrance ceremony was held on August 14, 2006, at the Albany campus. The ceremony was attended by numerous campus leaders including Provost Susan Herbst, SUNY Chancellor John Ryan, Senator Hillary Clinton, Congressman John E. Sweeney, and Albany Mayor Gerald Jennings.

== Personal life ==
He was married to Phyllis, and was survived by his sister, Mary Bouvier, as well as several nieces, nephews, grand-nieces and grand-nephews.

Academic offices
Preceded by George H. Emert	President of Utah State University; January 1, 2001 – January 31, 2005	Succeeded by Stan L. Albrecht
Preceded by John R. Ryan (Interim)	President of University at Albany; February 1, 2005 – August 13, 2006	Succeeded by Susan Herbst (acting)
