= Hakimabad, Fariman =

Hakimabad حكيم اباد
- Village
- Location within Iran
- Coordinates: 35°54′09″N 59°41′55″E
- Country: Iran
- Province: Razavi Khorasan
- County: Fariman
- Bakhsh: Central
- Rural District: Sang Bast

Population (2006)
  - Total: 116
- Time zone: UTC+3:30 (IRST)
  - Summer (DST): UTC+4:30 (IRDT)

Hakimabad (Persian: حكيم اباد, also Romanized as Ḩakīmābād) is a village in Sang Bast Rural District, in the Central District of Fariman County, Razavi Khorasan Province, Iran. At the 2006 census, its population was 116, in 32 families.
