= Stanford Cazier =

American educator (1930-2013)

12th President of Utah State University
- In office 1979–1992
- Preceded by: Glen L. Taggart
- Succeeded by: George H. Emert

President of California State University, Chico
- In office 1971–1979

Personal details
- Born: June 11, 1930 Nephi, Utah
- Died: March 14, 2013 (aged 82) Logan, Utah

Stanford Orson "Stan" Cazier (June 11, 1930 – March 14, 2013) was an American educator, university administrator and scholar. He was president of California State University, Chico from 1971–1979 and Utah State University from 1979–1992.

== Biographical background ==
Cazier was born in Nephi, Utah. He studied at the University of Utah, receiving his Bachelor of Arts degree in 1952. During 1952–1953, he served as an ensign in the United States Navy. He briefly attended Brigham Young University for graduate work, but then transferred to the University of Utah to complete his Master of Arts degree in 1956, writing his thesis on William Henry Hooper. He then earned a Ph.D. in history under the well-known intellectual history historian, Merle Curti, at the University of Wisconsin in 1964.

While an undergraduate, Cazier met Shirley Anderson at the University of Utah. They were married June 11, 1952 in Salt Lake City and had three sons. Shirley died in Logan, Utah on February 16, 1999.

=== Professor ===
Returning to Utah, Cazier became a professor of history at Utah State University (USU) in 1960, where he was the Teacher of the Year for 1966. In 1967 he was awarded a Ford Foundation Fellowship by New York University's Academic Administration. During this time he was also an administrative intern and Assistant to the President of New York University.

Before completing his Ph.D. dissertation, Jan Shipps was one of Cazier's students at USU in 1960–1961 for a Civil War class. However, Cazier focused mostly on the Utah War, much like others at USU who taught Mormon issues in their classes and influenced Shipps to become a historian of Mormonism.

While at Utah State University, he later served as assistant to the president and vice-provost.

=== University president ===
In July 1971, Cazier replaced Lew D. Oliver as president of Chico State College in northern California. On June 1, 1972, Cazier brought Chico State College into the California State University system, renaming it California State University, Chico. He also oversaw campus expansion, including the construction of some larger buildings on campus and the remodeling of the auditorium and administration buildings. During his presidency, the faculty expanded and unionized.

As university president, Cazier confronted issues at the school during the period between the political unrest of the 1960s and the community disruption of the 1980s. In late 1975 and early 1976, student protesters occupied the administration building while upset about the arming of campus security personnel. Cazier also experienced continual budget problems at the university. At his departure in 1979, the school suffered through a state budget crisis, potential budget cuts and continued student political protests. Despite the problems, Cazier was admired by student leaders, faculty, staff, and system-wide officials as an accessible leader and supporter of the academic community.

In 1979, Cazier began a new position as president of Utah State University. He served in this position until his retirement in 1992. In 1998, Utah State University named the Cazier Science and Technology Library in his honor. In 2005, the library and another were replaced by a larger consolidated facility named the Merrill-Cazier Library. Cazier remained a full-time professor at Utah State University until 1997 and continued to teach occasional classes as professor emeritus.

=== Personal struggles ===
At the end of Cazier's tenure at USU, his wife Shirley developed Parkinson's disease, coupled with dementia. In November 1998, his son Paul developed glioblastoma multiforme, a fatal brain cancer. A week later, Cazier's sister was killed in an automobile accident while traveling to help care for Shirley, who died three months later.

Amidst this loss, a newspaper article quoted USU's research vice president, Peter Gerity, who said Cazier left the university with debts of three million dollars. In a telephone conversation, Cazier heatedly argued with and challenged Gerity to meet him to "help him get a clearer focus on the truth," to which Gerity called the campus police.

After this, Cazier worked to rebuild his life by volunteering with Meals on Wheels, nursing home reading and English as a second language students. In his retirement, Cazier also obtained a commercial driver's license to begin driving a semi-trailer truck.

== Mormon studies ==
Cazier has participated in several Mormon studies ventures. He was a member of the editorial board of Dialogue: A Journal of Mormon Thought during 1966, the inaugural year of the periodical, and was on the editorial board of BYU Studies from 1969–1974. He was published in Dialogue and presented to a Sunstone Symposium in 1981. As an associate of Leonard J. Arrington and other Mormon historians, Cazier was also involved in the organizing of the Mormon History Association.

== Writings ==
- Cazier, Stanford (1956). The Life of William Henry Hooper, Merchant Statesman. Master's thesis. Salt Lake City: University of Utah..
- Cazier, Stanford (1964). CARE: A Study in Cooperative Voluntary Relief. Ph.D. thesis. Madison: University of Wisconsin.
- Cazier, Stanford (1970). "Student Power and in loco parentis". In Julian Foster, Durward Long (ed.). Protest! Student Activism in America. New York: Morrow.
- Cazier, Stanford (1970). "Educational Reform and International Understanding". In Robert A. Marshall (ed.). Can Man Transcend His Culture? The Next Challenge in Education for Global Understanding. Washington, D.C.: American Association of State Colleges and Universities.
- Cazier, Stanford (1973). Student Discipline Systems in Higher Education. ERIC/Higher Education Research Report. Vol. 7. Washington, D.C.: American Association for Higher Education.
- Cazier, Stanford (1979). "Continuity, Change, and Challenge". Utah State University inaugural address: 10..
- Cazier, Stanford (1984). "Excellence–An Issue of Values". Excellence. Salt Lake City: Deseret Book.
- Cazier, Stanford (1984). "USU's Land-Grant Role and Continuing Commitment to Agriculture". Address to the Utah Farm Bureau Federation, November 16, 1984: 14..
- Cazier, Stanford (Winter 1989). "Honoring Leonard Arrington". Dialogue: A Journal of Mormon Thought. 22 (4): 55–60. Archived from the original on 2011-06-14.

Preceded by Lew Dwight Oliver (interim)	President of California State University, Chico; July 1971 – August 1979	Succeeded by Robert L. Fredenburg (acting)
Preceded by Glen L. Taggart	President of Utah State University; June 15, 1979 – June 30, 1992	Succeeded by George H. Emert
