= Noelle E. Cockett =

American geneticist

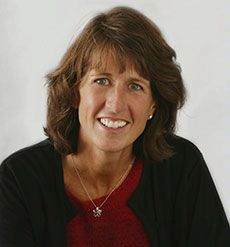

16th President of Utah State University
- In office January 2017 – August 1, 2023
- Preceded by: Stan L. Albrecht
- Succeeded by: Elizabeth R. Cantwell

Personal details
- Education: Montana State University (BS); Oregon State University (MS, PhD)

Noelle E. Cockett is an American geneticist and academic administrator who served as the 16th president of Utah State University. On November 22, 2022 Cockett announced she would retire as USU's president effective July 1, 2023.

== Early life and education ==
Cockett grew up on a cattle ranch in Miles City, Montana. She earned a Bachelor of Science in animal science from Montana State University. She then received a masters and a doctorate in animal breeding and genetics from Oregon State University.

== Career ==
Cockett worked as a research geneticist at the United States Department of Agriculture at the U.S. Meat Animal Research Center in Clay Center, Nebraska. She joined the faculty of Utah State University in 1990 as a researcher and assistant professor in the Department of Animal, Dairy and Veterinary Sciences in the College of Agriculture and Applied Sciences. Her research program centered on the identification of genetic markers associated with economically important traits in sheep, as well as the development of resources that advance research on the sheep genome. Cockett and her colleagues published an article describing the sheep genome sequence in Science in 2014. Cockett has served as the United States coordinator for sheep genome mapping since 1993 and is an active member of the International Sheep Genomics Consortium.

Cockett was dean of the College of Agriculture and Applied Sciences at Utah State from 2002 to 2013, and director of the Utah Agriculture Experiment Station from 2009 to 2013. She was an administrator at Utah State as vice president of the USU Extension from 2006 to 2013, and executive vice president and provost from 2013.

Cockett was appointed Utah State University's 16th president in October 2016, officially assuming the role in January 2017. She is Utah State's first female president. In 2019, she announced plans for a diversity task force to address inclusion to assess the university's progress and contribute to a five-year strategic plan. Cockett has spoken publicly about the importance of free speech and dialogue on campuses, calling the "free exchange of ideas in higher education" paramount.

=== Controversy ===
On December 11, 2020, the Utah State football team unanimously voted to sit out their final game of the season against Colorado State University following comments Cockett allegedly made about an assistant coach. The comments came during a video conference days earlier, when Cockett explained the decision to pass over assistant coach Frank Maile for the vacant head coaching position. The players claimed that during the call Cockett expressed negative views about Maile's cultural and religious background. Maile is a member of the Church of Jesus Christ of Latter-day Saints and is Polynesian. Cockett later apologized and said her remarks were not meant to be interpreted as discriminatory. The university's board of trustees announced it would open an independent investigation into the matter. In January 2021, the board announced unanimous support for Cockett, stating that the players misunderstood the intent of her comments, which Cockett and the board said had been misreported and taken out of context.

== Awards and honors ==
- Young Scientist Award from the Western Section of the American Society of Animal Science (ASAS) 1998.
- Distinguished Service Award from the Western Section of the American Society of Animal Science (ASAS) 2007.
- Utah Governor's Medal for Science and Technology (2004 and 2015)
- D. Wynne Thorne Research Award

== Works ==
- Noelle E. Cockett; Chittaranjan Kole (2009). Genome Mapping and Genomics in Domestic Animals. Springer Science+Business Media. ISBN 978-3-540-73834-3.
