= Elizabeth R. Cantwell =

American researcher

Elizabeth Cantwell

12th President of Washington State University
- Incumbent
- Assumed office April 1, 2025
- Preceded by: Kirk Schulz

17th President of Utah State University
- In office August 1, 2023 – February 19, 2025
- Preceded by: Noelle E. Cockett
- Succeeded by: Alan L. Smith (Interim)

Personal details
- Born: 1955 or 1956 (age 70–71)
- Education: University of Chicago (BA); University of California, Berkeley (MA, PhD); University of Pennsylvania (MBA)
- Scientific career
- Fields: Mechanical engineering
- Institutions: Lawrence Livermore National Laboratory; Arizona State University; University of Arizona; Utah State University
- Thesis: Buoyancy and heat loss effects in near interface smoldering combustion (1992)
- Doctoral advisor: Carlos Fernández-Pello

Elizabeth R. Cantwell (born 1955 or 1956) is an American researcher who is the president of Washington State University. From August 1, 2023, to February 19, 2025, she was president of Utah State University.

== Education ==
Cantwell has a B.A. in human behavior from the University of Chicago (1976). In 1992, she received her Ph.D. in mechanical engineering from the University of California, Berkeley. In 2003, she earned a M.B.A. in finance & entrepreneurship from the University of Pennsylvania, Wharton School.

== Career ==
Cantwell worked for the Lawrence Livermore National Laboratory, where she was director for economic development and focused on developing research programs for the U.S. Department of Defense. From 2015 to 2019, she was at Arizona State University. After leaving ASU, Cantwell was a professor of aerospace-mechanical engineering and the senior vice president for research and innovation at the University of Arizona.

Cantwell was named president of Utah State University on May 19, 2023. She resigned after eighteen months amid lawsuits filed by employees in the athletic department alleging she oversaw their wrongful termination and allegations of her overspending on perks relating to improvements to her office, purchase of vehicles, and excessive travel. It was also alleged that she engaged in online secret chat forums with other university executives in order to avoid Utah's open records laws.

After Cantwell's resignation, the Utah Legislature suspended part of Utah State University's budget, pending the results of a state audit into spending during her tenure. The results of the audit alleged USU was not complying with required procurement protocols and called for USU's Board of Trustees to provide more oversight of administrative spending. The audit also found that under Cantwell's leadership USU exhibited a pattern of "severe noncompliance" with spending rules. It alleged that Cantwell attempted to use her position to award university contracts to companies controlled by friends, likely violating Utah state law.

Full university funding was reinstated after new president Brad Mortensen agreed to comply with the recommendations of the audit and promised to change the culture of university leadership. Mortensen said that USU "had policies in place that should've prevented such incidents, but they weren’t followed." The process of appointing Cantwell was called "a failure" by Utah Sen. Chris Wilson, who said the state needed to attract better candidates for university leadership roles.

Cantwell became president of Washington State University on April 1, 2025.

== Awards and honors ==
Cantwell was elected as a fellow of the American Association for the Advancement of Science in 2019. In 2020, she received the MSS Transformational Leadership Award.
