= Khoshk Rud Rural District (Zarandiyeh County) =

Rural district in Markazi province, Iran

Khoshk Rud Rural District Persian: دهستان خشك رود
- Rural District
- Location within Iran
- Coordinates: 35°18′N 50°21′E
- Country: Iran
- Province: Markazi
- County: Zarandiyeh
- District: Central
- Established: 1987
- Capital: Khoshkrud

Population (2016)
  - Total: 4,384
- Time zone: UTC+3:30 (IRST)

Khoshk Rud Rural District (Persian: دهستان خشك رود) is in the Central District of Zarandiyeh County, Markazi province, Iran. It is administered from the city of Khoshkrud.

== Demographics ==
=== Population ===
At the time of the 2006 National Census, the rural district's population was 9,431 in 2,104 households. There were 3,667 inhabitants in 1,106 households at the following census of 2011. The 2016 census measured the population of the rural district as 4,384 in 1,440 households. The most populous of its 49 villages was Hoseynabad, with 1,678 people.

=== Other villages in the rural district ===
- Ahmadabad
- Aliabad
- Amaniyeh
- Azad Kin
- Bar Bar
- Esfahanak
- Hebran
- Karimabad
- Kushkak
- Lalekan
- Malard
- Qeshlaq-e Sabz Ali
- Seyyedabad
- Shur Bolagh
- Toraqan
- Verdeh
