= Hakimabad Rural District (Zarandiyeh County) =

Rural district in Markazi province, Iran

Hakimabad Rural District Persian: دهستان حكيم آباد
- Rural District
- Location within Iran
- Coordinates: 35°21′N 50°32′E
- Country: Iran
- Province: Markazi
- County: Zarandiyeh
- District: Zaviyeh
- Established: 1987
- Capital: Hakimabad

Population (2016)
  - Total: 8,669
- Time zone: UTC+3:30 (IRST)

Hakimabad Rural District (Persian: دهستان حكيم آباد) is in Zaviyeh District of Zarandiyeh County, Markazi province, Iran. Its capital is the village of Hakimabad.

== Demographics ==
=== Population ===
At the time of the 2006 National Census, the rural district's population (as a part of the Central District) was 8,327 in 2,183 households. There were 8,300 inhabitants in 2,479 households at the following census of 2011. The 2016 census measured the population of the rural district as 8,669 in 2,794 households. The most populous of its 72 villages was Hakimabad, with 1,322 people.

In 2021, the rural district was separated from the district in the formation of Zaviyeh District.

=== Other villages in the rural district ===
- Abbasabad-e Piazi
- Abbasabad-e Qarah Aghaj
- Alavi Culture and Technology Centre
- Musaabad
- Najafabad
- Nasirabad
- Qasemabad
- Raziabad
- Sadrabad
- Shekarabad
- Shurakabad
- Taqlidabad
