= Zaviyeh District =

District in Markazi province, Iran

Zaviyeh District Persian: بخش زاویه
- District
- Location within Iran
- Coordinates: 35°26′N 50°29′E
- Country: Iran
- Province: Markazi
- County: Zarandiyeh
- Established: 2021
- Capital: Zaviyeh
- Time zone: UTC+3:30 (IRST)

Zaviyeh District (Persian: بخش زاویه) is in Zarandiyeh County, Markazi province, Iran. Its capital is the city of Zaviyeh, whose population at the time of the 2016 National Census as 6,027 people in 1,880 households.

== History ==
In 2021, Hakimabad Rural District and the city of Zaviyeh were separated from the Central District in the formation of Zaviyeh District.

== Demographics ==
=== Administrative divisions ===
Zaviyeh District
Administrative Divisions
Hakimabad RD
Rahmatabad RD
Zaviyeh (city)
RD = Rural District
