= Zarandiyeh County =

County in Markazi province, Iran

Zarandiyeh County Persian: شهرستان زرندیه
- County
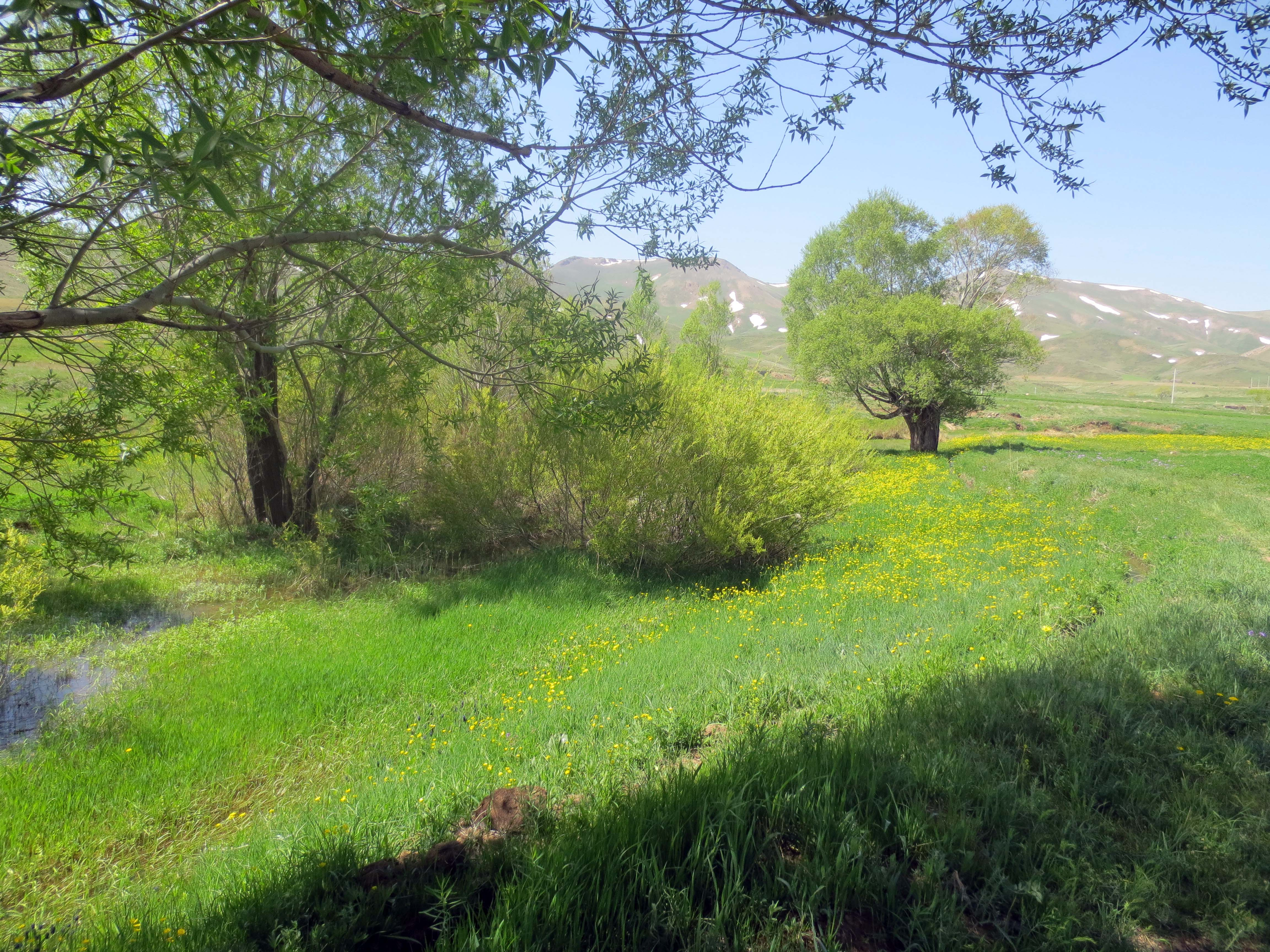
- Landscape near Chanaghchi

- Location of Zarandiyeh County in Markazi province (top, pink)

- Location of Markazi province in Iran
- Coordinates: 35°20′N 50°14′E
- Country: Iran
- Province: Markazi
- Established: 2003
- Capital: Mamuniyeh
- Districts: Central, Kharqan, Zaviyeh

Population (2016)
  - Total: 63,907
- Time zone: UTC+3:30 (IRST)

Zarandiyeh County (Persian: شهرستان زرندیه) (Note: Also romanized as Zarandieh) is in Markazi province, Iran, the northernmost county of the province. Its capital is the city of Mamuniyeh.

== History ==
The village of Khoshkrud was converted to a city in 2007. In 2021, Hakimabad Rural District and the city of Zaviyeh were separated from the Central District in the formation of Zaviyeh District, including the new Rahmatabad Rural District.

== Demographics ==
=== Population ===
At the time of the 2006 National Census, the county's population was 57,550 in 15,174 households. The following census in 2011 counted 57,153 people in 16,999 households. The 2016 census measured the population of the county as 63,907 in 20,483 households.

=== Administrative divisions ===
Zarandiyeh County's population history and administrative structure over three consecutive censuses are shown in the following table.

Zarandiyeh County Population
Administrative Divisions	2006	2011	2016
Central District	48,274	49,344	53,852
Hakimabad RD	8,327	8,300	8,669
Khoshk Rud RD	9,431	3,667	4,384
Rudshur RD	854	843	826
Khoshkrud (city)		5,019	5,246
Mamuniyeh (city)	17,337	19,005	21,814
Parandak (city) (Note: Formerly Rahimabad)	6,184	6,633	6,886
Zaviyeh (city)	6,141	5,877	6,027
Kharqan District	9,276	7,809	10,055
Alishar RD	2,349	2,093	1,969
Alvir RD	3,187	2,110	3,463
Duzaj RD	3,314	3,109	3,797
Razeqan (city)	426	497	826
Zaviyeh District (Note: Established after the 2016 census)			
Hakimabad RD			
Rahmatabad RD			
Zaviyeh (city)			
Total	57,550	57,153	63,907
RD = Rural District

== See also ==
Media related to Zarandieh County at Wikimedia Commons
