= Central District (Zarandiyeh County) =

District in Markazi province, Iran

Central District (Zarandiyeh County) Persian: بخش مرکزی شهرستان زرندیه
- District
- Location within Iran
- Coordinates: 35°20′N 50°31′E
- Country: Iran
- Province: Markazi
- County: Zarandiyeh
- Established: 2003
- Capital: Mamuniyeh

Population (2016)
  - Total: 53,852
- Time zone: UTC+3:30 (IRST)

The Central District of Zarandiyeh County (Persian: بخش مرکزی شهرستان زرندیه) is in Markazi province, Iran. Its capital is the city of Mamuniyeh.

== History ==
The village of Khoshkrud was converted to a city in 2007. In 2021, Hakimabad Rural District and the city of Zaviyeh were separated from the district in the formation of Zaviyeh District.

== Demographics ==
=== Population ===
At the time of the 2006 National Census, the district's population was 48,274 in 12,448 households. The following census in 2011 counted 49,344 people in 14,592 households. The 2016 census measured the population of the district as 53,852 inhabitants in 17,094 households.

=== Administrative divisions ===
Central District (Zarandiyeh County) Population
Administrative Divisions	2006	2011	2016
Hakimabad RD (Note: Transferred to Zaviyeh District)	8,327	8,300	8,669
Khoshk Rud RD	9,431	3,667	4,384
Rudshur RD	854	843	826
Khoshkrud (city)		5,019	5,246
Mamuniyeh (city)	17,337	19,005	21,814
Parandak (city) (Note: Formerly Rahimabad)	6,184	6,633	6,886
Zaviyeh (city)	6,141	5,877	6,027
Total	48,274	49,344	53,852
RD = Rural District
