= Baryaxes =

Ancient Median rebel leader

Baryaxes (Ancient Greek: Βαρυάξης) was a Mede who lived in the 4th century BCE. He was said to have been from Lak, though it is unclear which Lak this was.

After the conclusion of the Indian campaign of Alexander the Great, around 324 or 325 BCE, Baryaxes led some Median forces in a campaign of guerrilla warfare against the invaders' garrisons in Alexander's absence. He ultimately declared himself king of Media and Persia, and was said to have worn the upright kidaris, a headgear that by law was permitted to only the Persian and Median monarch, and which Alexander himself never wore.

He was shortly thereafter seized by the Persian nobleman Atropates, the satrap of Media after the dismissal of Oxydates, and was delivered to Alexander at Pasargadae. Alexander subsequently put him and his followers to death.
