= Kain kelubung =

Cloth

Kain Kelubung
- Material: batik, gold and silver silk

Kain kelubung, a cloth or scarf used to cover a woman's head and part of her face. Veil cloth is also said to be a second cover cloth for women which is used to cover half of the head and half of the body. If the woman enters the house or meets a muhrim, or is in a ceremony, this cloth is tied around the waist as an outside trade cloth.

== History ==
In the past, the veil became one of the mandatory clothes for women when leaving the house. However, if visiting the palace, the veil must be removed, folded and pinned. Most people are not allowed to wear more than one veil when attending royal ceremonies.

== How it's made ==
The veil cloth used in the past is made of batik cloth, rainbow cloth and telepuk cloth. Some also wear silk cloth sprinkled with gold thread from Palembang. Kain batik becomes a veil for daily wear while others are used for formal occasion.
