= Lak, Iran =

Lak (Persian: لك) may refer to:

- Lak, East Azerbaijan
- Lak, Hamadan
- Lak, Qazvin
- Lak, West Azerbaijan
- Lak Rural District, in Kurdistan Province
