= Atropates =

Persian nobleman and founder of Atropatene

Atropates (/əˈtrɒpətiːz/; Old Persian: *Ātr̥pātah and Middle Persian Ātūrpāt; Ancient Greek: Ἀτροπάτης Atropátēs; c. 370 BC – after 321 BC) was a Persian nobleman who served Darius III, then Alexander the Great, and eventually founded an independent kingdom and dynasty that was named after him. Diodorus (18.4) refers to him as Atrápēs (Ἀτράπης), while Quintus Curtius (8.3.17) erroneously names him 'Arsaces'.

== Biography ==
Towards the end of the Achaemenid Empire, Atropates was governor (satrap) of the Achaemenid province of Media. He was close to the royal family, and was possibly of Achaemenid descent himself. In the decisive Battle of Gaugamela (October 331 BCE) between Darius and Alexander, Atropates commanded the Achaemenid troops of Media and Sacasene.

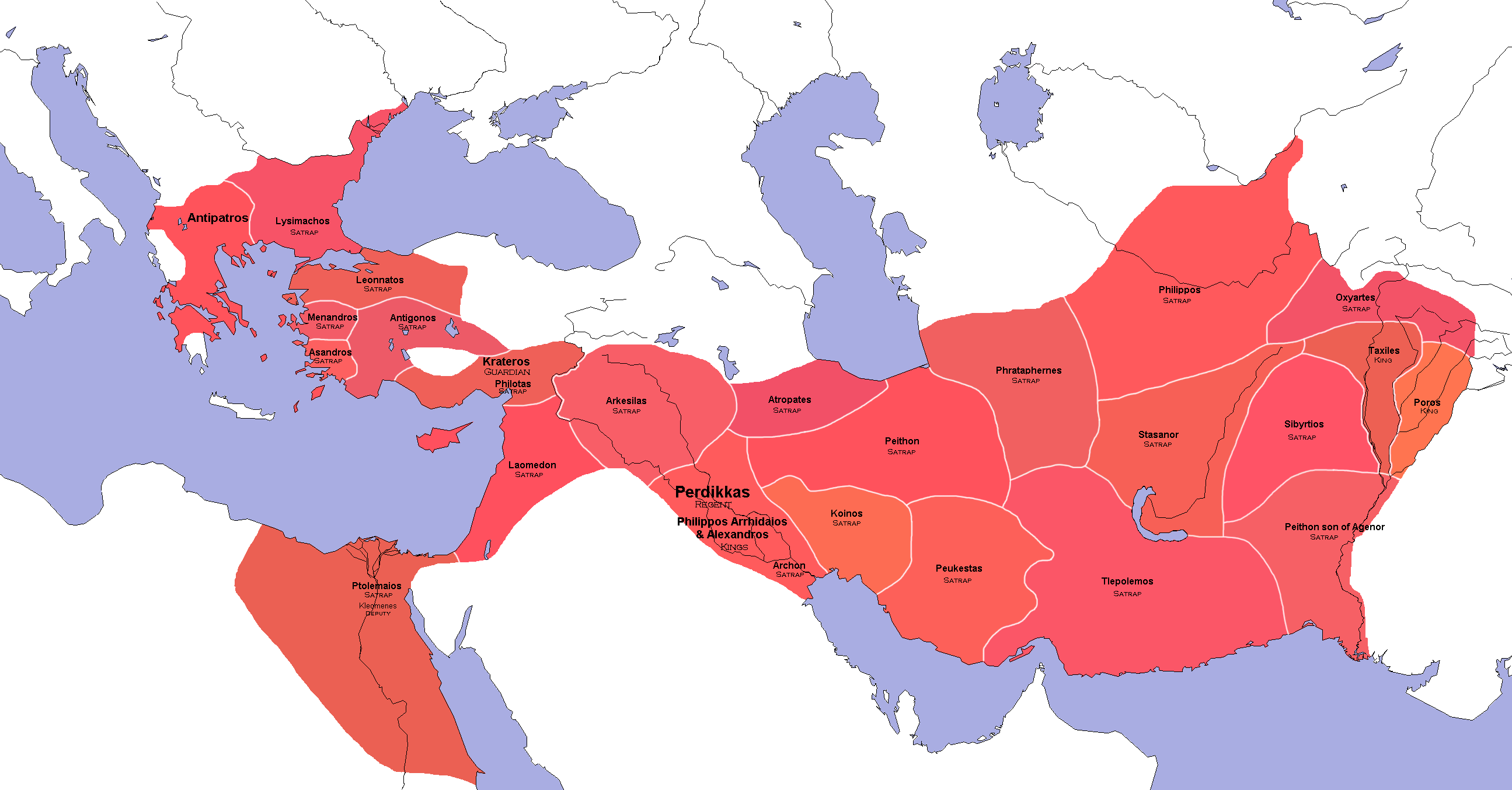
Atropates was allocated the Hellenistic satrapy of Media, in the Partition of Babylon (323 BC) following Alexander's death.

Following his defeat in that battle, Darius fled to the Median capital of Ecbatana, where Atropates gave him hospitality. Darius attempted to raise a new army but was forced to flee Ecbatana in June 330 BCE. After Darius' death a month later at the hands of Bessus, Atropates surrendered to Alexander. Alexander initially chose Oxydates as satrap of Media, but in 328-327 BCE after a period of two years Alexander lost trust in Oxydates' loyalty, and Atropates was reinstated to his old position. In 325–324, Atropates delivered Baryaxes (a sought-after rebel of the region) to Alexander while the latter was at Pasargadae. Alexander's esteem for the governor rose so high that soon afterwards Atropates' daughter was married to Alexander's confidant and cavalry commander Perdiccas at the famous mass wedding at Susa in February 324 BCE.

Later that year, Alexander visited Atropates in Ecbatana with his good friend and second-in-command Hephaestion, who fell ill and died in October 324 BCE. At this time, "[i]t was related by some authors, that Atropates on one occasion presented Alexander with a hundred women, said to be Amazons; but Arrian ([Anabasis] vii. 13) disbelieved the story."

Alexander himself died eight months later on June 10, 323 BCE, and Atropates' new son-in-law Perdiccas was named regent of Alexander's half-brother Philip III. Following the "Partition of Babylon" in 323 BCE, Media was divided into two parts: the greater portion in the south-east was to be governed by Peithon, a general of Perdiccas, while a smaller portion in the north west (principally around the Araxes River basin) was given to Atropates. At some point thereafter, Atropates refused to convey allegiance to the diadochi and made his part of Media an independent kingdom, while his son-in-law Perdiccas was eventually murdered by Peithon in the summer of 320 BCE.

== Legacy ==
The dynasty Atropates founded would rule the kingdom for several centuries, at first either independently or as vassals of the Seleucids, then as vassals of the Arsacids, into whose house they are said to have married.

The region that encompassed Atropates' kingdom came to be known to the Greeks as Ἀτροπάτιος Μηδία (Atropátios Mēdía, lit. 'Atropatian Media') after Atropates, and eventually simply Ἀτροπατία (Atropatía) or Ἀτροπατηνή (Atropatēnḗ). The Arsacids called it 'Aturpatakan' in Parthian, as did also the Sasanians who eventually succeeded them. Eventually, Middle Iranian Āturpātakān became Āzarbāygān and Āzarbāyjān in New Persian, whence the names of the modern nation of Azerbaijan and the Iranian region of Azerbaijan (which is largely contiguous with the borders of ancient Atropatene). Medieval Arab geographers came up with other explanations of the name, such as 'fire temple' or 'guardian of the fire', from the Persian words āzar 'fire', and pāyegān 'guardian/protector'.

== Bibliography ==
=== Ancient works ===
- Justin, Epitome of the Philippic History of Pompeius Trogus.
- Strabo. Geographica.
  - Hamilton, H. C.; Falconer, W., eds. (1856). The Geography of Strabo. Vol. 2. London: Henry G. Bohn.

=== Modern works ===
- Boyce, Mary (2000). "Ganzak". In Yarshater, Ehsan (ed.). Encyclopædia Iranica. Vol. X/3: Fruit–Gāvbāzī. London and New York: Routledge & Kegan Paul. pp. 289–290. ISBN 978-0-933273-47-4.
- Buttrick, George Arthur, ed. (1956). The Interpreter's Bible. Vol. 6.
- Chaumont, M. L. (1987). "Atropates". In Yarshater, Ehsan (ed.). Encyclopædia Iranica. Vol. III/1: Ātaš–Awāʾel al-Maqālāt. London and New York: Routledge & Kegan Paul. pp. 17–18. ISBN 978-0-71009-113-0.
- Fredricksmeyer, Ernst (2002). Bosworth, A. B.; Baynham, E. J. (eds.). Alexander the Great and the Kingship of Asia. Alexander the Great in Fact and Fiction: Oxford University Press. pp. 1–370. ISBN 9780199252756.
- Gardner, Dorsey, ed. (1884). A Practical Dictionary of the English Language, Giving the Correct Spelling, Pronunciation, and Definitions of Words.
- Mukherjee, Bratindra Nath (1972). The Pāradas.
- de Planhol, X. (1987). "Azerbaijan i. Geography". In Yarshater, Ehsan (ed.). Encyclopædia Iranica. Vol. III/2: Awāʾel al-maqālāt–Azerbaijan IV. London and New York: Routledge & Kegan Paul. pp. 205–215. ISBN 978-0-71009-114-7.
- Schippmann, K. (1987). "Azerbaijan iii. Pre-Islamic History". In Yarshater, Ehsan (ed.). Encyclopædia Iranica. Vol. III/2: Awāʾel al-maqālāt–Azerbaijan IV. London and New York: Routledge & Kegan Paul. pp. 221–224. ISBN 978-0-71009-114-7.
- Schottky, Martin (1989). Media Atropatene und Gross-Armenien in hellenistischer Zeit (in German). Bonn: R. Habelt. ISBN 978-3-7749-2394-2.
- Roisman, Joseph (2002). Brill's Companion to Alexander the Great. London and New York: Edinburgh University Press. pp. 1–436. ISBN 9789004217553.
- Tavernier, Jan (2007). Iranica in the Achaemenid Period (ca. 550-330 B.C.): Lexicon of Old Iranian Proper Names and Loanwords, Attested in Non-Iranian Texts. Peeters Publishers. ISBN 9789042918337.
