= Focale =

Roman military scarf

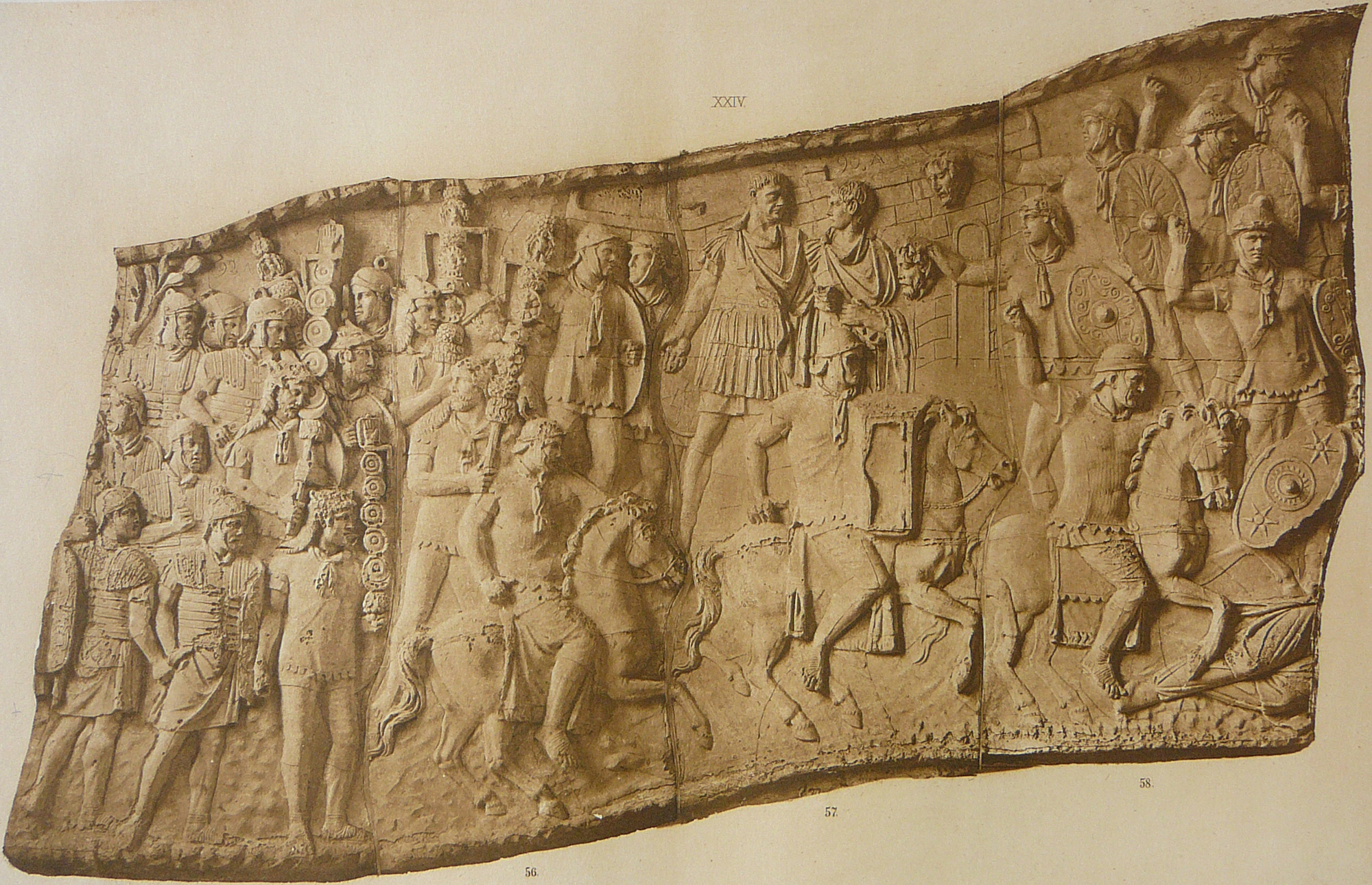
Focalia worn by cavalry troopers and some infantry on a panel from Trajan's Column

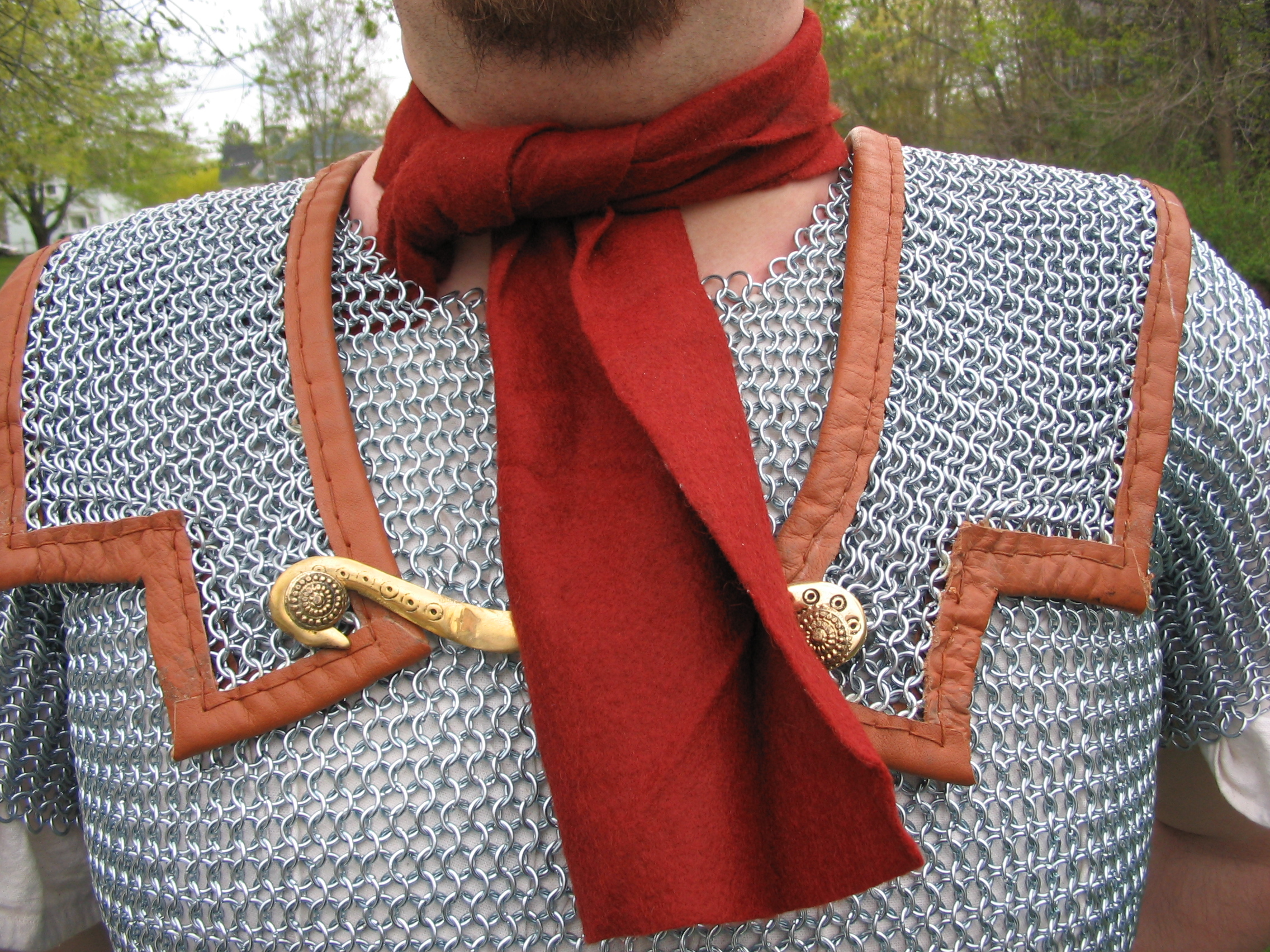
Focale on a Roman military reenactor

The focale (plural focalia), also known as a sudarium ("sweat cloth"), was a woolen or linen scarf worn by ancient Roman military personnel. It protected the neck from chafing by the armor and was used for warmth. The focale is depicted widely in military scenes from Roman art, such as the relief sculpture on the Arch of Septimius Severus in the Roman Forum and Trajan's Column. It is shown loosely knotted in the front, but is sometimes visible with the ends tucked inside the cuirass.

In Latin literature, focale is a general word for a scarf or wrapping for the throat. A focale was one of the gifts that might be given for the December festival of Saturnalia, according to Martial. In one of his satires, Horace lists focalia among the "badges of illness" (insignia morbi). In describing the correct attire for public speaking, Quintilian advises against wearing a focale, unless required by poor health.

Although a sudarium often is used as a handkerchief, it can be worn like the focale as a neckerchief. When Suetonius describes the overly casual attire of Nero, the emperor is barefoot, unbelted, and dressed in evening wear (synthesis), with a sudarium around his neck. The sudarium may be the precursor to the focale. In late antiquity, orarium (Greek orarion) might be synonymous with focale, as in the description of military attire in the Vision of Dorotheus, and in a papyrus (dated 350–450 AD) listing military clothes. From the sudarium derives the name of the Near Eastern sudra, a similar piece of cloth with various functions over time.

The focale is sometimes seen as one of the precursors of the necktie. Cesare Vecellio (1530–1606) mentions the focale, calling it a cravata (cravat), as worn by Roman soldiers in his book on the history of fashion. It has been compared to the amice (amictus) worn by Roman Catholic priests, which is depicted from the 6th century onward, as in the Ravenna mosaics.
