= Kidaris =

Ancient Persian hat

Kidaris (Ancient Greek: κίδαρις) or kitaris (Ancient Greek: κίταρις) was a head ornament of Persian clothing worn by monarchs of ancient Persia.

In many English language works, this is often translated as "tiara" -- using the word with which some contemporary non-Persian writers described it -- but it was not a mundane garment, but a special, ceremonial item that by law was to be worn only by the king. To don the kidaris was to declare oneself king, as many usurpers, such as Baryaxes, were known to have done.

It appears it may have been specifically part of a ceremonial outfit for horseback riding, rather than court attire.

== Appearance ==
What, exactly, the kidaris looked like has been the subject of some debate among scholars. The ancient sources describe it as a sort of "upright tiara with diadem".

It was likely a high cap made out of cloth or felt, with two lappets and a brilliant blue and white headband, though is sometimes described in sources up through the 19th century as featuring, or being composed of, gold, largely owing to disagreement over what exactly the dramatist Aeschylus in his play The Persians meant by calling the headgear of the Persian king "φάλαρον" (possibly "decorated with metal"), though this is not widely accepted by modern scholars.

The headgear itself may have been very similar to that which was worn by the king's royal subjects, with the distinguishing feature being the erect "upright"-ness of the hat, whereas the headgear of his subjects were more of a softer and floppier character, and lacked the king's diadem.

=== Identification with crenellated crown ===
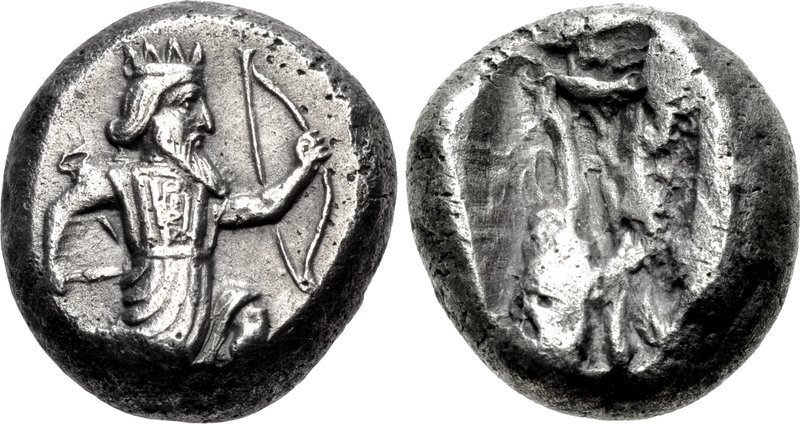
Achaemenid coin showing a man wearing the crenellated crown.

Many modern scholars assume this to have been the same as the kind of crenellated crown that can be seen in the court art of the Achaemenid Empire, and which is similar to the Armenian tiara that is itself sometimes called kidaris or kitaris.

Others object to this on account of how clearly ancient sources say the kidaris could by law only be worn by the monarch, whereas the crenellated Achaemenid crown was many times depicted as being worn by people who were not the king.

=== Identification with kyrbasia ===
Some scholars, such as Christopher Tuplin, have proposed that kidaris/kitaris is a Semitic language variant word of the Persian kyrbasia, and denotes the same headgear.

Many writers use kidaris and kyrbasia as interchangeable.

=== Identification with sudra ===
Some scholars, such as 20th century rabbi and a Talmudic scholar Saul Lieberman, have suggested that the Jewish head-covering known as the sudra was actually a kidaris, or descended from it.

== Confusion with other headdress ==
Since there is not unequivocal consensus about what the kidaris was, caution should be exercised when viewing images described as depicting a kidaris, as modern writers may uncritically describe a crenellated Achaemenid crown or a kyrbasia or other ancient Persian headgear as being a "kidaris".

As early as the 10th century, the editors of the Byzantine encyclopedia known as the Suda noted that writers used the term kidaris to indiscriminately refer to various different types of headwear.
