= Sudra (headdress) =

Ancient Jewish headdress

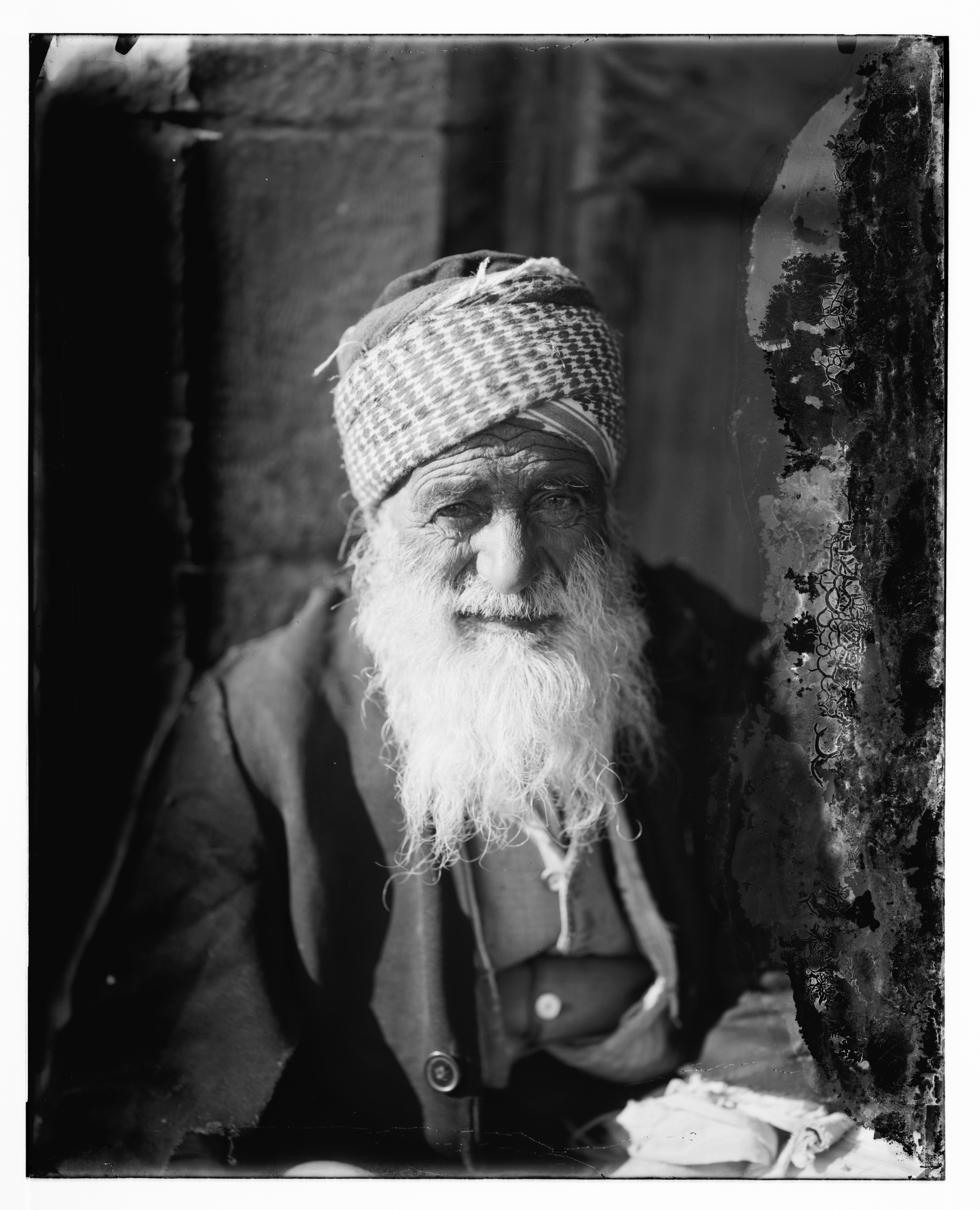
Yemenite Jew wearing a sudra, 1914

The sudra (Jewish Babylonian Aramaic: סודרא, romanized: suḏārā; Hebrew: סוּדָר, romanized: suḏār) is a rectangular piece of cloth that has been worn as a headdress, scarf, or neckerchief in ancient Jewish tradition. Over time, it held many different functions and is today sometimes understood to be of great cultural and/or religious significance to Jews.

It is mentioned in various ancient and medieval Jewish and Christian religious texts in Aramaic and Koine Greek, written in or around the Near East. Among them are the New Testament, the Targum Neofiti, the Peshitta, the Babylonian Talmud (this text makes numerous mentions of the sudra and is an important source for the role it played in Jewish life at the time), and the Targum Pseudo-Jonathan.

== Etymology ==
The English sudra derives from Jewish Aramaic סודרא, suḏārā. It in turn derives from the Koine Greek: σουδάριον, romanized: soudárion, lit. 'towel', a borrowing of the pre-Augustan Latin: sūdārium, lit. 'cloth for wiping away sweat, handkerchief', if not directly from Latin. The word originates in Latin, deriving from the adjective sūdārius , lit. 'sweaty' from Latin: sūdor, lit. 'sweat' and the suffix -ārium meant to denote purpose in this case.

The Babylonian Talmud presents what Jastrow calls a "playful etymology" of the term as a contraction of Biblical Hebrew: ס֣וֹד יְ֭הֹוָה לִירֵאָ֑יו, romanized: sud ʾadonay lireʾāw, lit. 'The secret of the Lord is with them that fear Him', a section of Psalm 25:14.

== History ==
=== Prominence in the ancient Near East ===
The exact historical origins of wearing a piece of cloth wrapped around one's head are, at the moment, unclear. Some of the earliest examples can be found in artworks from ancient Mesopotamia, like statues of statues of Gudea wearing a turban-like garment. Similar headdresses might have been worn back as early as 2600 BCE. These headdresses are often imbued with great historical, religious, and cultural significance in the Near East. According to the Irish Professor of Biblical studies John Raymond Bartlett, the Hebrews also wore pieces of cloth, either fashioned like the keffiyeh, a folded-up piece of fabric wound around one's head, or like a turban or knit cap.

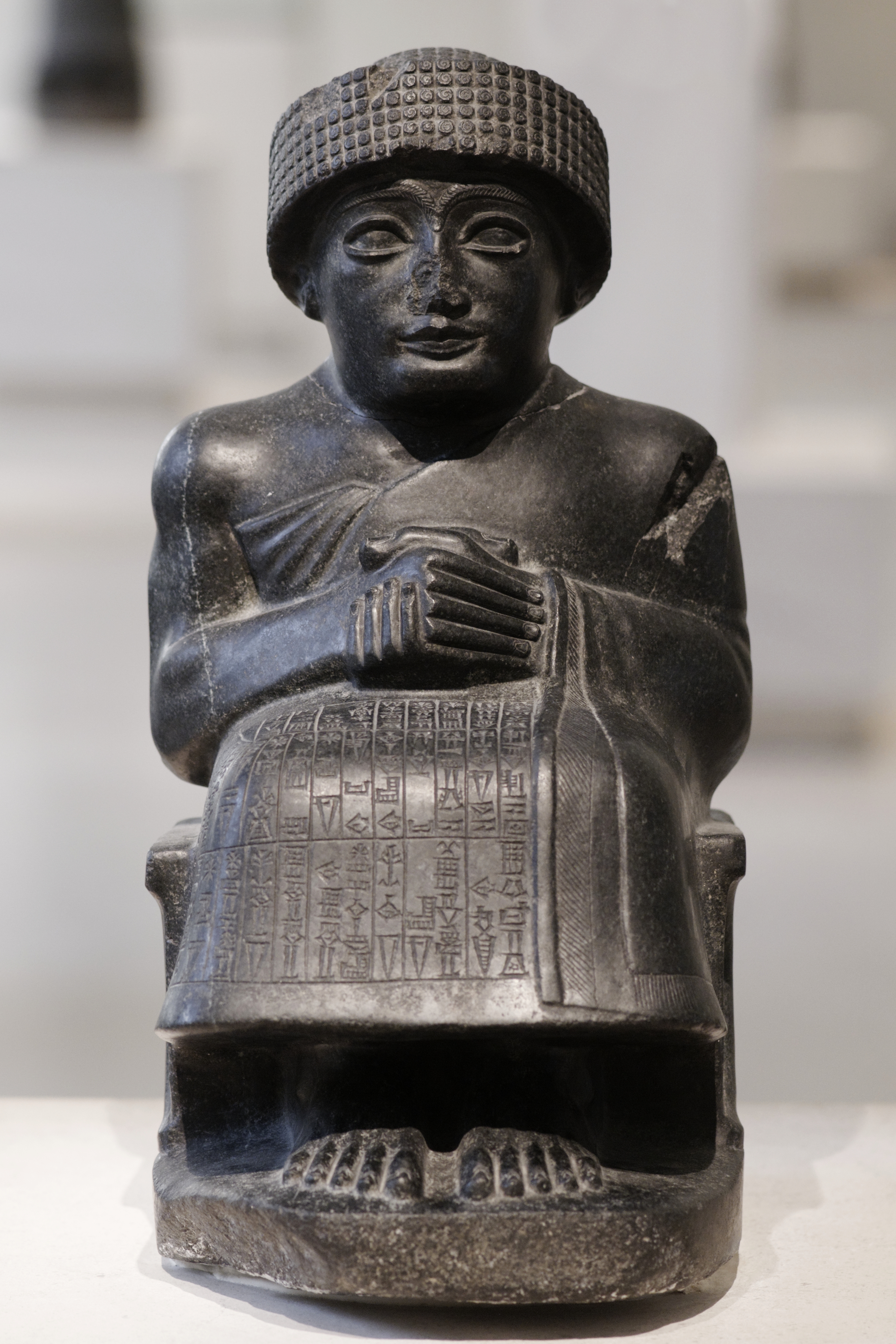
Statue of Gudea wearing a turban-like garment from c. 2400 BCE

=== In Judea and the Roman Empire ===
The sūdārium was kept much like a pocket handkerchief but mainly used for wiping away sweat, as the name implies. It was a modern invention around the time of Cicero when fine-linen first came to Rome. In the east of the empire, the term was borrowed by Hellenistic writers as σουδάριον soudárion, replacing older terms. It can be found in texts dealing with events in Province of Judaea like the New Testament for example, where it is mentioned in Luke 19:20, John 11:44, John 20:7 (see Sudarium of Oviedo) and Acts 19:12. Besides being used to wipe away sweat it was also worn around the neck as a piece of clothing akin to a scarf. In the Latin-speaking empire the term ōrārium came to replace sūdārium during the Augustan age. This piece of cloth when waved in the air also came to be used to signify applause in Rome, replacing the lappet of the toga used previously for this purpose. Wilhelm Adolf Becker argues against the use of the sūdārium being used to wipe one's nose. The sūdārium also came to be part of Roman military armor, commonly called focale in its function as a neckerchief to protect against chafing by the armor. This use of the sūdārium in Roman military attire is sometimes seen as precursor of the modern necktie.

=== Mesopotamia ===
In the 5th century when the Peshitta was translated, the term sudra refers to a shroud (burial cloth); for example, in John 11:44 (Classical Syriac: ܘܰܐܦ݁ܰܘܗ݈ܝ ܐܰܣܺܝܪܳܢ ܒ݁ܣܽܘܕ݂ܳܪܳܐ, romanized: wappaw asīrān bəsūḏārā, lit. 'and his face bound in a sudra'). This meaning is reflected in the names of the relics of the Sudarium of Oviedo and the Sudarium of Veronica.

Katz, Houtman, and Sysling explain why the same name would call a burial cloth and a headdress. While discussing the meaning of Hebrew: שְׂמִיכָה, romanized: śəmiḵā, lit. 'blanket', a word mentioned a single time in the Hebrew Bible in Judges 4:18, rabbinical scholars of Syria Palaestina championed definitions for the obscure term, which define it as a sudra, while those from Babylon champion the definition משיכלא "cloak". This elucidated the Jewish Palestinian Aramaic use of the term sudra as a broad term for textile sheets used for coving the bodies of human beings. Sokoloff corroborates this broader use stating the sudra to have been a "piece of cloth [...] employed to tie and cover a variety of items" apart from a garment. (Note: Being used to wrap jugs, tefillin, money, and foodstuffs according to the Babylonian Talmud.)

==== Babylonian Talmud ====
The Babylonian Talmud details different Jewish customs surrounding the sudra; for example in tractate Bava Metzia it tells of letting another man touch a sudra, at least 3 finger-widths by 3 finger-widths large, in place of the sandal demanded by Ruth 4:7, for purposes of authorising a transaction. Wajsberg identifies this mention of the sudra as a late addition to the text, being absent from earlier versions and as evidence of Jewish Palestinian Aramaic linguistic influence on the Babylonian Talmud. Havlin also observes that some versions of the targum of the Book of Ruth 1:17 contain the term. In most versions of the section, in which Naomi lists four methods of execution employed by the Jews, the fourth method is stated as 'cruxifixction'. MS De Rossi 31 however deviates from this claim, through what appears to be a scribal correction of what the corrector understood to be a halakhic error. It states: וחניקת סודרה uḥəniqaṯ suḏrā "and suffocation [by means of] sudra" instead of וצליבת קיסא uṣəliḇaṯ qaysā "and crucifixion on wood". Havil's view of the sudra being a tool for torment and execution in halakhic tradition is based on numerous mentions of this use, such as the Targum Pseudo-Jonathan's translation of Exodus 21:16 (יתקטיל בשינוקא דסודרא yiṯqaṭṭil bšinnuqā ḏsudrā "he should be killed by strangulation of the sudra") as well as a section from Avodah Zarah which states, רמו ליה סודרא בצואריה וקא מצערו ליה rmu leh sudrā ḇṣwāreh uqā mṣaʿʿaru leh|lit "They threw a sudra around his neck and tormented him".

=== Styles ===
The Babylonian Talmud states fashions of wearing the garment and who wore it. Several tractates thereof describe it as being wrapped around one's head. Berakhot 60b:5 additionally provides a prayer to be recited upon attiring the garment in this fashion: ברוך ... עוטר ישראל בתפארה baruḵ ... ʿuṭer yiśraʾel bṯip̄ʾārā|liṯ "Blessed ... is he who crowns Israel with glory".

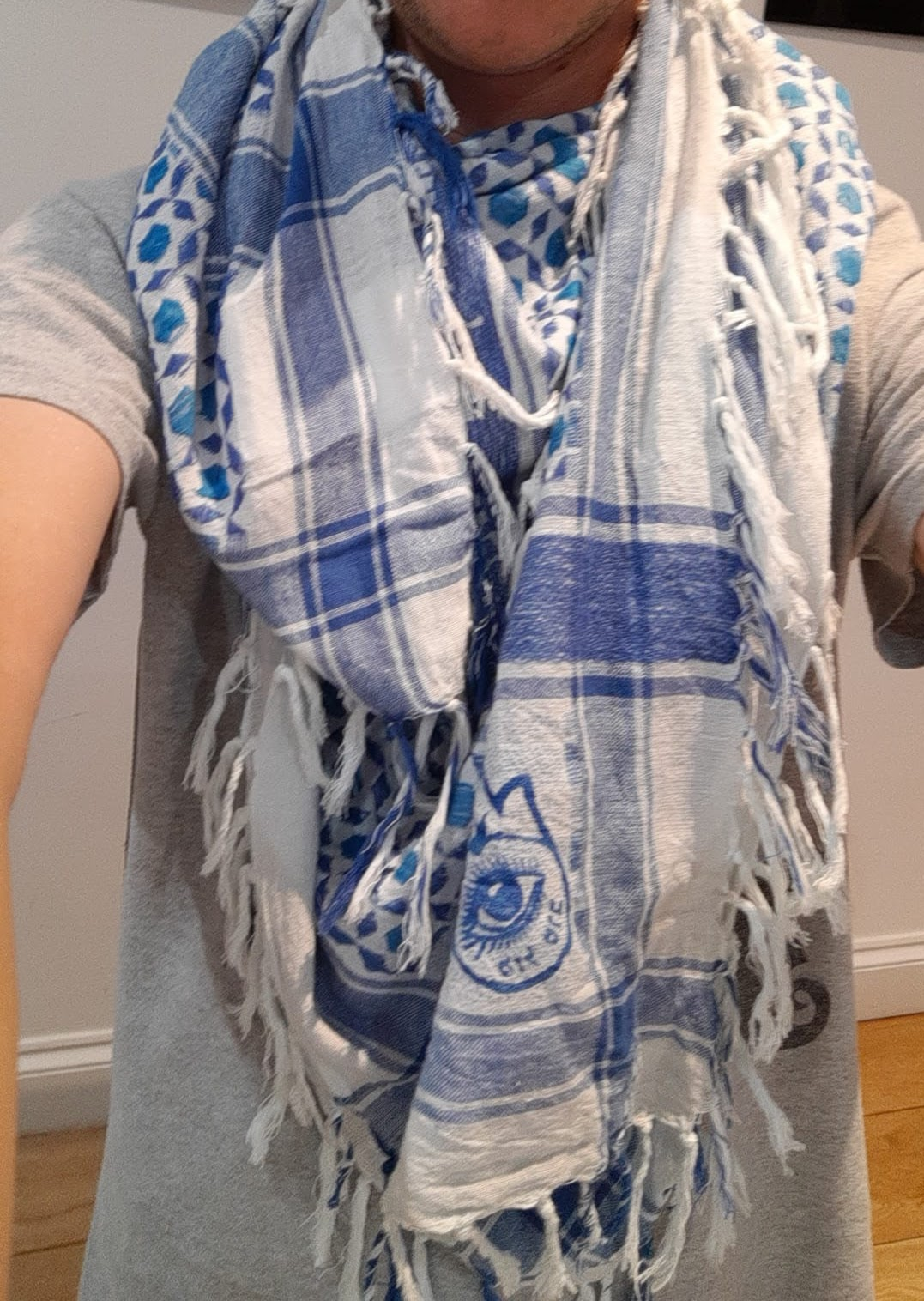
Sudra worn around body and neck

Another fashion mentioned therein is wearing the sudra around one's neck, Marcus Jastrow suggests that it also had been worn over one's arms. The Orach Chayim section of the Shulchan Aruch, a collection of religious law from 1565, states that the Arabic name of the sudra worn this way is שי״ד šid; סודר שנותנין על הצואר במלכות א"י שנקרא בערבי שי"ד וכן ביק"א שהיו נותנין בספרד על כתפיהם פטורים, lit. "A sudra which is worn upon the neck in the kingdom of the Land of Israel named in Arabic šīd, also the biqā, which was worn in Sepharad (Spain) over their shoulders are exempt [from the requirement of tzitzit]". The 10th century commentator Rashi states, "And the Sudra is arranged on one's neck – and the ends were used to wipe one's mouth or eyes" (וסודר שבצוארו - ותלויין ראשיו לפניו לקנח בו פיו ועיניו), commenting on this passage.

Saul Lieberman suggests that the headdress worn by religious authorities called "a sudra" is unrelated to the Roman sudarium and is instead a cidaris (κίδαρις kídaris), a loanword from a Semitic language and cognate to Hebrew: כֶּתֶר, romanized: keṯer, lit. 'crown'). For this he, cites an early medieval Latin glossary which states, "The Cidarim is a cloth which Jews keep over their heads during day of the Sabbath." (Cidarim linteus est quod repites iudeorum die sabbato super caput habent ualde mundum.) The cidaris was a turban-like headdress worn by the Kings of Persia and, as stated before, also the rabbinical authorities.

According to Lier, Targumim suggest Moses wore a sudra on his head, specifically his radiant forehead, thus concealing the nature of Yahweh, except when revealing the Ten Commandments, when he is meant to have removed his sudra from his forehead according to Lier.

There is textual evidence for its use as footwear.

=== Decline ===
Amongst Mizrahi Jews, the custom mostly remained despite prohibitions imposed by various non-Jewish rulers. One example of such a prohibition is the 1667 ʿAṭarot decree issued by the Qasimid State, which prohibited Jews from wearing anything resembling an ʿaṭaroṯ (Judeo-Yemeni Arabic: עטרת, romanized: ʿaṭaroṯ, lit. 'cloth turbans', from Hebrew: עטר, romanized: ʿāṭer, lit. 'to crown'); that is, from wearing any cloth to cover their heads. The goal of this decree was to humiliate Jews by depriving them of a respectable appearance by forcing them to use their clothes to cover their heads. The situation was remedied by Yemenite Jews bribing government officials. The solution achieved through this allowed Jews to wear cloths on their heads again, but they had to be shabby cloths.

== See also ==
- Sudarium – Roman garment conceptually related
- Priestly turban – Ancient Jewish headdress
- Keffiyeh – Similar regional headdress
- Shtreimel – Jewish fur headdress
