= Oxydates =

Persian nobleman

Oxydates (Old Persian: Waxsu-data) was a Persian nobleman, who served as the satrap of Media under the Macedonian king Alexander the Great (r. 336–323 BC) from 330 BC to 328 BC. Before his appointment, Oxydates had for an unknown reason been imprisoned at Susa by his former suzerain, the Achaemenid ruler Darius III (r. 336–330 BC). He was eventually found and released by Alexander, whom he accompanied to Rhagae. It was during that period Oxydates was appointed satrap of Media, thus replacing Atropates. However, he was convicted of misconduct in late 328 BC, and thus lost his office to Atropates. It unknown what happened to Oxydates afterwards. He may have been arrested or executed by Atropates at the instruction of Alexander, or even managed to escape.

Following Oxydates' dismissal, a Mede named Baryaxes rebelled, donning an upright tiara as well as assuming the title of king. He and his supporters were subsequently defeated by Atropates, who delivered them to Alexander at Pasargadae in early 324 BC, where they were executed. Oxydates may have had some sort of connection with the rebels.

== Sources ==
- Heckel, Waldemar (2006). Who's Who in the Age of Alexander the Great: Prosopography of Alexander's Empire. Blackwell Publishing. ISBN 978-1405188395.
