= Scarf =

Garment of fabric worn around neck or head

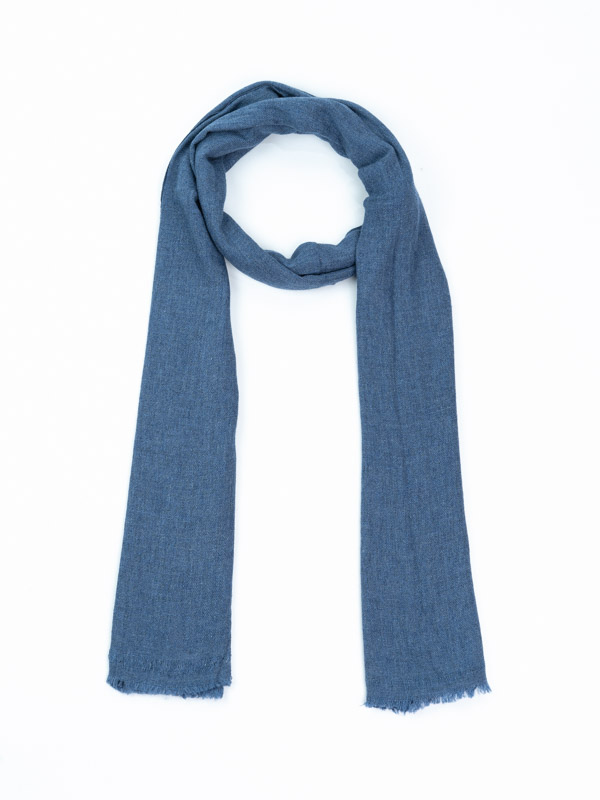

A scarf (pl.: scarves or scarfs) is a long piece of fabric that is worn on or around the neck, shoulders, or head. A scarf is used for warmth, sun protection, cleanliness, fashion, religious reasons, or to show support for a sports club or team. Scarves can be made from materials including wool, linen, silk, and cotton. It is a common type of neckwear and a perennial accessory.

== History ==
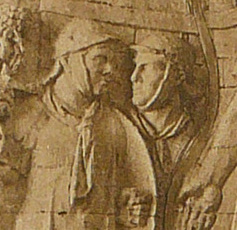
Focalia on a panel from Trajan's Column

=== Antiquity and the Middle Ages ===
Scarves have been worn since ancient history. In 1350 BC, in Ancient Egypt, Queen Nefertiti is said to have worn a tightly woven headscarf, and a 9th-century BC statue of Ashurnasirpal II depicts the emperor wearing a shawl.

In 500 BC in Athens, women wore scarves to enhance their seductive charm; in the same period, Indian women wore them flirtatiously as headgear.

During the reign of the Chinese Emperor Cheng, from 259 to 210 BC, scarves were used as military markers to identify the rank of Chinese warriors or their status as officers; many of the Terracotta Warriors are depicted wearing them.

In Ancient Rome, around AD 10, the garment was used for cleanliness rather than warmth. It was called a focale or sudarium (transl. "sweat cloth") and was used to wipe sweat from the neck and face in hot weather. Scarves were originally worn by men around their necks or were tied to belts.

In the 1200s, Egyptian belly dancers wore a scarf-like belt low on the hips to highlight their body movements.

=== Modern era ===
Around the 17th century in Croatia, soldiers of all ranks wore scarves; officers wore silk scarves while other ranks were issued with cotton scarves. Some Croatian soldiers served as mercenaries with the French forces; their scarves were sometimes referred to as "cravats" (from the French cravate, meaning "Croat"), and were the precursor to the necktie. The modern British "cravat" is called an "ascot" in American English.

During the French Revolution, women and men wore differently coloured scarves to display their political affiliations to democratic principles of Liberté, Egalité, Fraternité; and Cravates. The French epitomised the elegant scarf style. The French word for "scarf" is a derivative of the Croatian word Kravata.

In the New England region of North America, bereaved families were given a scarf as a thank-you gift, as a mark of respect.

Napoleon Bonaparte found Egyptian scarves attractive and bought them as gifts for his wife. After this gift, Empress Josephine Bonaparte is believed to have acquired over 400 scarves in the following three years costing about £80,000. Following this, the people of Paisley, Scotland, started manufacturing their own scarves.

The scarf became a real fashion accessory by the early 19th century for both men and women.

==== Twentieth century ====
During World War I and II, women in the United States considered it a patriotic duty to knit scarves for the soldiers, along with other necessities. During these two wars, fighter pilots wore scarves to keep themselves warm in high altitudes and to cover their necks.

By the middle of the 20th century, scarves became one of the most versatile clothing accessories for both men and women. Throughout the 20th century, the fashion industry adopted the scarf. Thierry Hermès of Hermès created silk scarves that were modelled on those Napoleon's soldiers wore in battle. Hermes started making scarves that were designed by some of the biggest names in the fashion and music industries in Hollywood; actor Grace Kelly sported one of Hermes's scarves. Hermes imported raw silk from China that was made into long-lasting high-quality fabric with hand print; the process involved 43 screens to produce colour effects, and this printed scarf design was exhibited in a picture by two women in white wigs playing a game.

Silk scarves were also modelled by actors Faye Dunaway in Bonnie and Clyde (1967) and Diane Keaton in Annie Hall (1977). Madonna, in the 1980s, corralled her perm with a scarf. Alexander McQueen's much-copied silk-skull scarves have generated rage among celebrities and fans.

== Uses and types ==
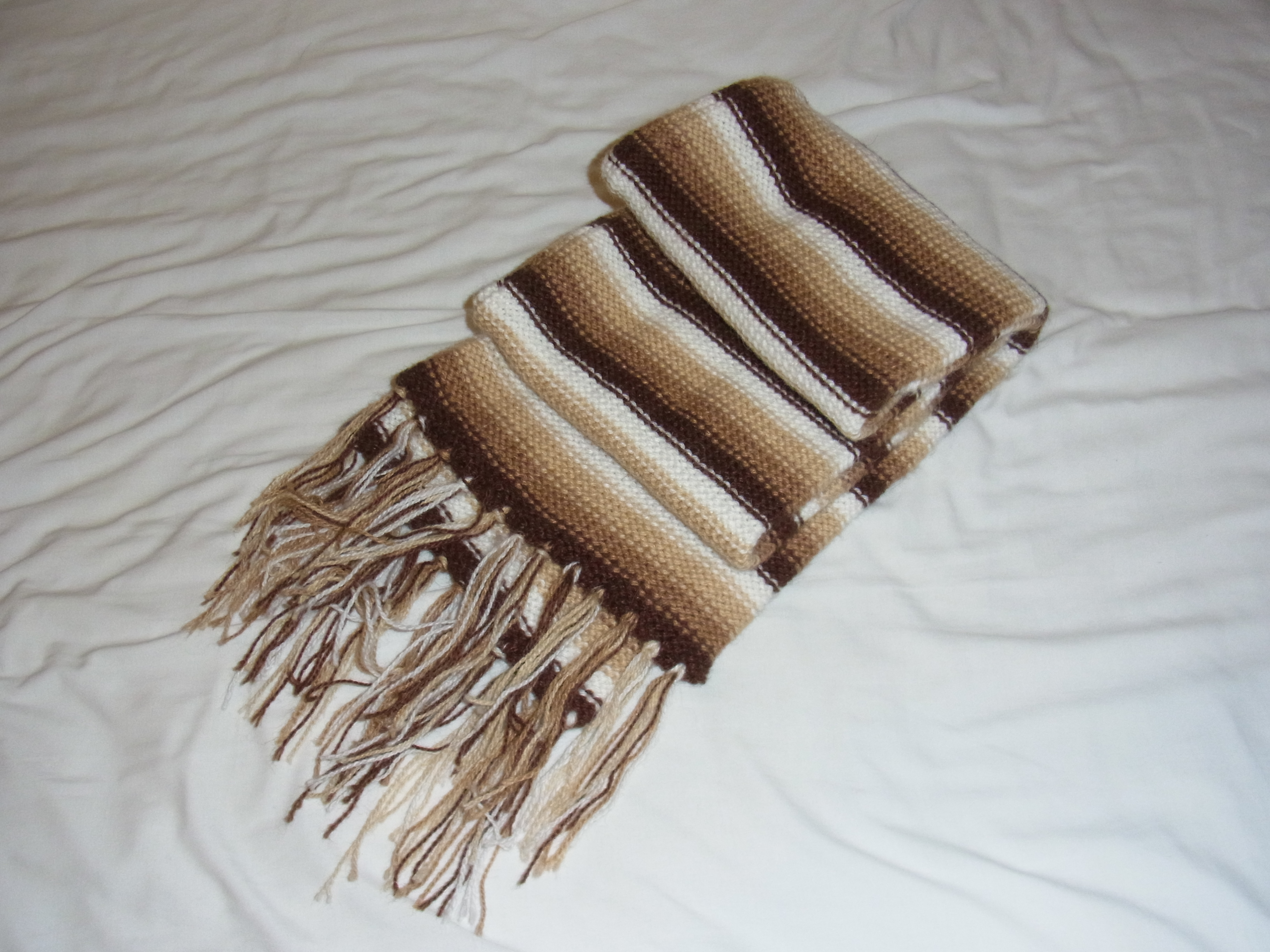
A knitted scarf made from alpaca wool

There are many types of scarf, including neck scarves, ponchos, head scarves, and kerchiefs. They are chiefly worn around the neck or head.

Winter scarves are used in cold climates; these are often knitted; and commonly made of wool. The winter scarf is sometimes called a muffler, and is usually accompanied by a heavy jacket or coat. The winter scarf can be wrapped around the face and ears for additional protection from cold.

In dry, dusty, warm climates or environments with airborne contaminants, a thin headscarf, kerchief or bandanna is often worn over the eyes, nose, and mouth to keep the hair clean. This custom has evolved into a fashionable item in many cultures, particularly among women. The cravat, an ancestor of the necktie and bow tie, evolved from scarves of this sort in Croatia From the keffiyeh, a headscarf worn by men in the Middle East has come the Palestinian keffiyeh, worn to symbolise support for the cause of Palestine.

In India, woollen scarves with Bandhani work adopting tie-and-dye techniques are commonly worn in Bhuj and Mandvi in the Kutch District of Gujarat. In India and elsewhere there is a trend of wearing a scarf or dupatta as a safeguard against pollution.

In Indonesia and Malaysia the slenddang is a native scarf or sash, 20 to 21 inches (51 to 53 cm) wide and 85 to 86 inches (220 to 220 cm) long that is worn principally by the Malaysian women, being draped over one shoulder and across the body diagonally. They are both printed and coloured.

Scarves that are used to cover the lower part of the face, and in particular the neck, are sometimes called cowls. Scarves can colloquially be called a neck-wrap.

Scarves can be tied in many ways, including the pussy-cat bow, the square knot, the cowboy bib, the ascot knot, the loop, the necktie, and the gipsy kerchief. Scarves have also been tied on the head as a headscarf. Monarchs, including Queen Victoria and Queen Elizabeth I, have worn the headscarf. During the late 1990s, it was a fashion trend with hip hop and R&B artists. During the period of silent films, actors Anna May Wong and Evelyn Brent wore headscarves of sophisticated silks and popularised them. In Islamic religious culture, wearing a head scarf is linked to the Quran. In Saudi Arabia, wearing a head scarf is necessary to face the harsh climate and intense heat, even before Islam was adopted. During the same period, Christians and Jews also covered their hair with veils as dictated by their sacred texts.

Scarves are also used as fashion accessories with evening gowns by draping them over the shoulders or arms; one example is the feather boa.

=== In religious or cultural use ===
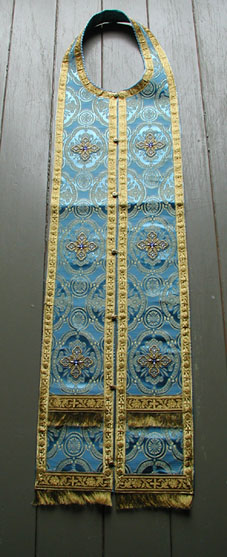
Eastern Christian epitrachelion

The ecclesiastical scarf was originally a loose wrap or muffler (band) that was worn around the neck when out of doors. In the English Church, in post-Reformation times, the minister wore the scarf over the surplice, which was a broad band of black silk with fringed ends arranged like the stole around the neck but falling nearly to the feet. The scarf's use has been almost entirely replaced by that of the stole, with which it has sometimes been confused.

Several Christian denominations include a scarf known as a stole as part of their liturgical vestments. In the English Church, the scarf of colour made of black silk, which is twice the width of a stole, is worn around the neck of chaplains, doctors of religion, and other clergy. Mourners at funerals wear a black scarf made of silk or crape over the right shoulder. Scarves of coloured silk are worn on public occasions, and in the courts and lodges by members of many social orders, such as Foresters and Odd fellows.

In a procession organised by the Masonic Lodge, marshals wear a cocked hat, sword, and scarf. In the procession, the colour of the scarf is mandatorily blue for Subordinate Lodge and purple for the Grand Lodge.

The khata is a scarf used in Himalayan buddhist tradition as an offering or a gift, usually white in Tibetan tradition but elsewhere blue or other colours.

=== In uniforms ===
Pilots of early aircraft wore white, silken scarves and knitted scarfs to keep oily smoke from the exhaust out of their mouths while flying. Pilots of closed-cockpit aircraft wore scarves to prevent neck chafing, especially by fighter pilots, who were constantly turning their heads from side to side, watching for enemy aircraft. Today, military flight crews wear scarves imprinted with unit insignia and emblems for esprit-de-corps and heritage reasons rather than practical purposes.

The dress code adopted by pilots and cabin crew has changed over time. In the early years of flying, aircraft pilots copied the pilots of World War I, and adopted silk scarves and gloves as part of their outfit of flying boots and leather bomber jackets. Modern commercial airline pilot's uniform has a nautical look. The flight attendant's uniform has also undergone substantial changes; many female uniforms include a scarf. The modern trend is to follow national traditions of dress. In this context, female cabin crew of Emirate Airlines wear a drape scarf. Thai Airways female cabin crew wear pink and purple silks with sashes; Fiji Airways female crew wear scarves with bula prints. Air Canada's dictum is; "Wear your scarf at all times".

Students in the United Kingdom and Ireland traditionally wear academic scarves with distinctive combinations of colours identifying their university or college. This scarf is made from Saxony wool and usually measures 2 metres (6.6 ft) in length, with a rectangular shape, and two or more longitudinal coloured stripes.

Members of the Scout Movement wear a scarf, sometimes called a neckerchief, as part of their uniform. The Scout scarf was copied from common frontier, rural and outdoor wear. Such a scarf can be used to cover the face from dust or sun or for first aid with a bleeding injury or as a splint, sling or bandage. Some communist Young Pioneers wore a red scarf and some fascist Balilla and the Hitler Youth wore scarves.

=== In sport ===
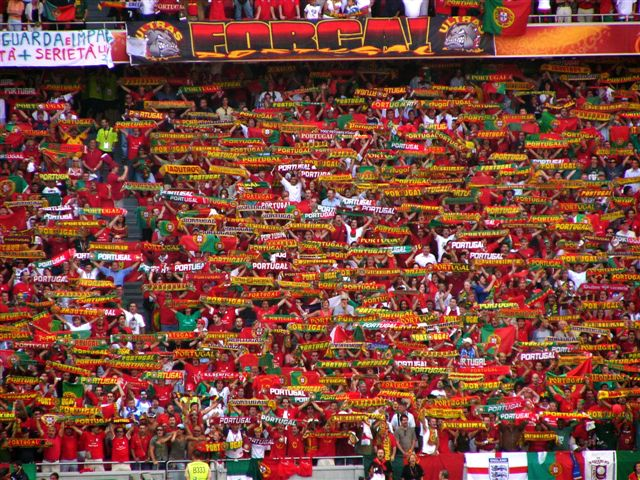
Portuguese football scarves held in a coordinated 'Scarf Wall' display, Euro 2004

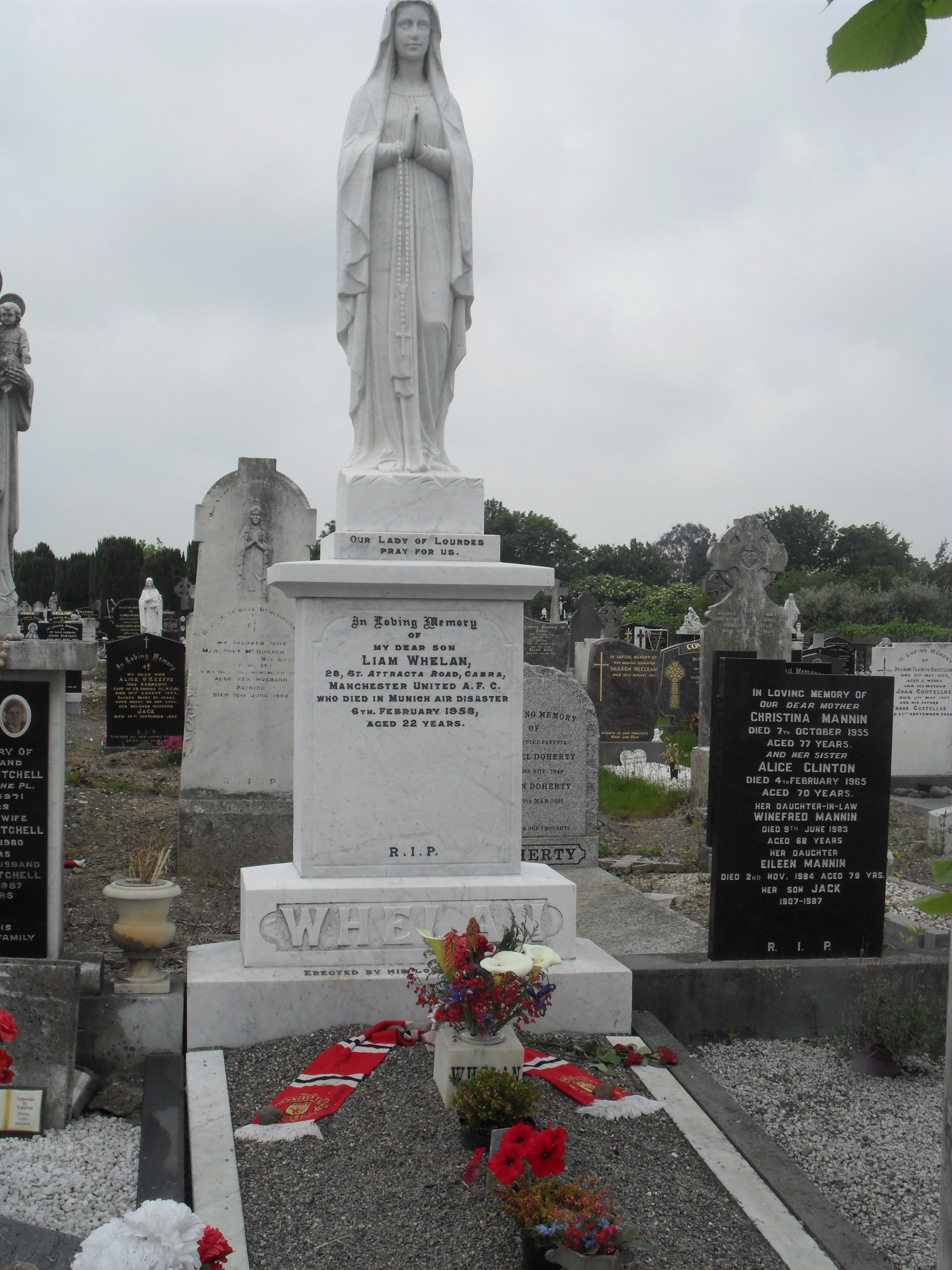
Grave of Liam Whelan, Glasnevin Cemetery, decorated with a Manchester United scarf. Football scarves often form part of memorials.

At football matches, supporters wear scarves and shirts in club colours. Scarves have been worn in the UK since at least the early 1930s, when the phenomenon of scarves began in Britain. Scarf-wearing became common in 1970s. Team scarves in football matches represent fans' loyalty and are an insignia rather than a protective piece of clothing. They are usually about three to five feet (0.91 to 1.52 m) long and six to ten inches (15 to 25 cm) wide. Scarf sales are an important part of the football economy throughout Europe. In the late 1990s, coloured scarves have been traditional supporter wear for fans of association football (soccer) teams across the world, even those in warmer climates. These scarves come in a wide variety of sizes and are made in team colours, and designs may include:

- The club or team crest
- Pictures of renowned players
- Various slogans relating to the club's history and its rivalry with others

Initially, two-coloured scarves were called granny scarves because the players' grandmothers knitted them. At some clubs, supporters sometimes perform a "scarf wall" in which all supporters in a section of the stadium will stretch out their scarves above their heads, creating a wall of colour.

This scarf wall is usually accompanied by the singing of a club anthem, such as "You'll Never Walk Alone" at Liverpool F.C. matches, or national anthems such as "La Marseillaise" at France national football team matches. The socio-cultural anthropology of football is compared to a religious service by way of raising hands, singing the club's anthem, shouting slogans, jumping up, and whistling and clapping. By the end of the 19th century, in Britain, football had changed from an amateur game of the bourgeois into a professional, working class sport, and later an international spectacle.

Half-and-half scarves, where each half of the design represents one of the teams playing, are also sold at matches. Also known as friendship or matchday scarves, they are popular with neutral spectators as souvenirs, but are the subject of some controversy among more partisan fans.

Under Aussie rules, the Australian Football League (AFL) commands the country's largest sport audiences. At matches, fans wear apparel including scarves, knitted hats, and shirts.

== Manufacture ==
The knitting of garments such as scarves is an important trade in some countries. Hand-knitted scarves are still common as gifts.

Printed scarves are offered internationally through high-fashion design houses, including Burberry, Missoni, Alexander McQueen, Valentino, Cole Haan, Chanel, Etro, Lanvin, Louis Vuitton and Prada.

Hermès, which made its first scarf in 1937, has produced more than 2,000 designs. In 1937, Hermès designed a woodblock scarf made of Chinese silk that was worn by Queen Elizabeth II of England, American First Lady Jacqueline Kennedy Onassis, and Grace Kelly.

The basic scarf shapes are square, triangular, and rectangular. The most common type is the square scarf, which can be folded to form a rectangular or triangular scarf. A sash is usually a long, narrow rectangle. The size of either can range from mini to maxi. The style of the garment with which the finished scarf is worn will make a difference, as will the way it is tied.

== Gallery ==
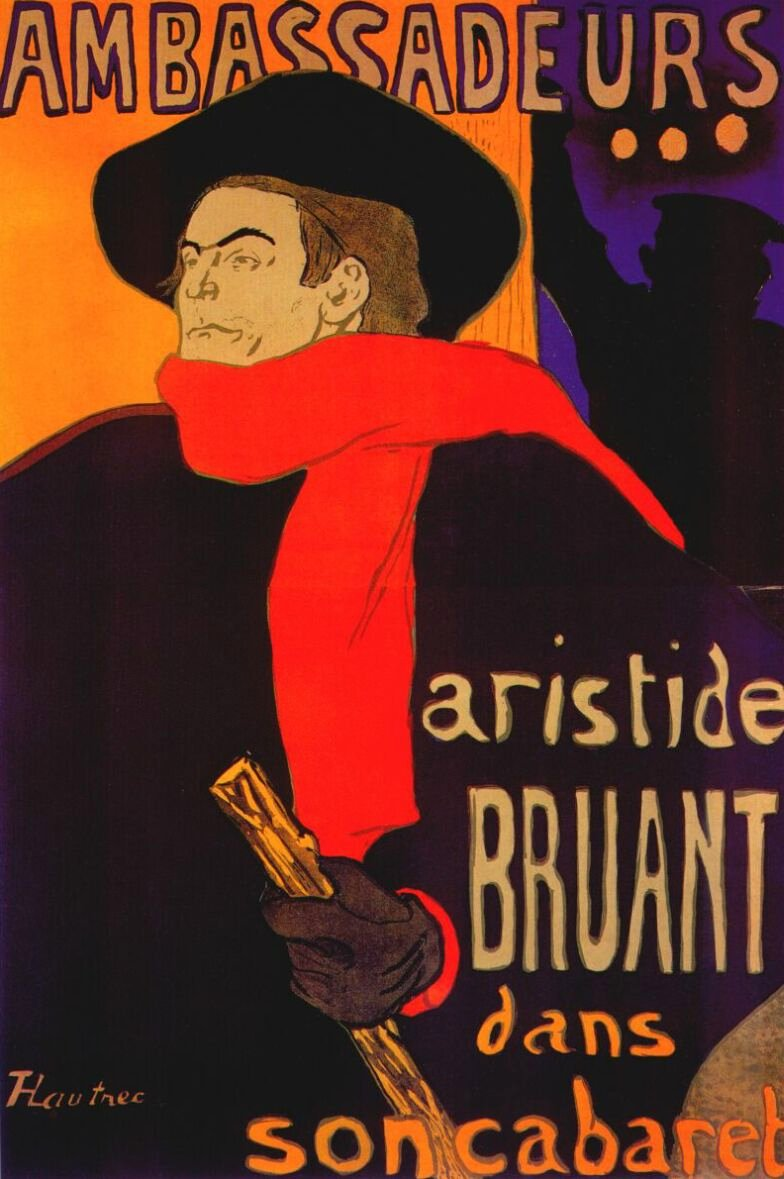
Aristide Bruant and scarf by Henri de Toulouse-Lautrec

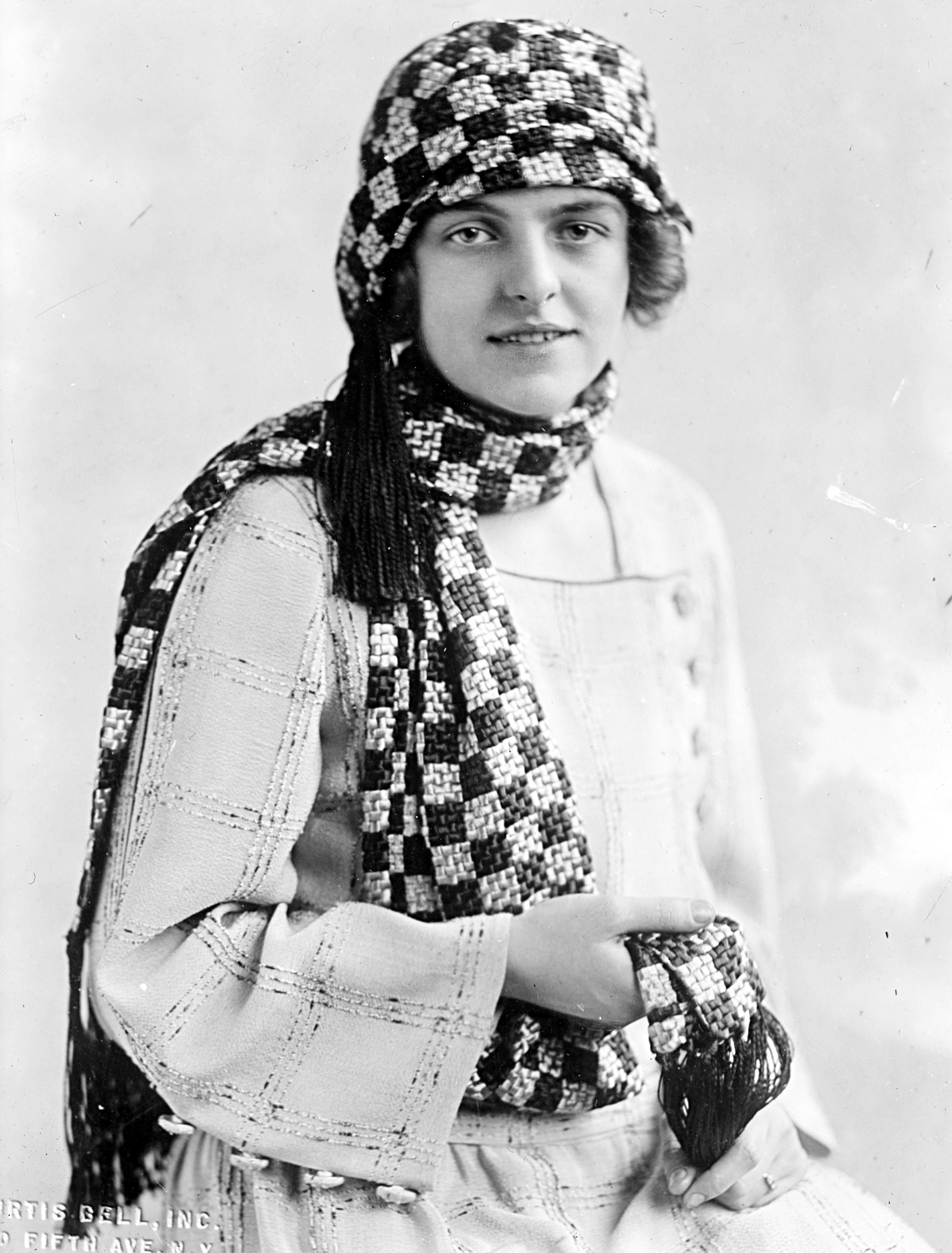
Woman wearing a 1920s head and neck scarf

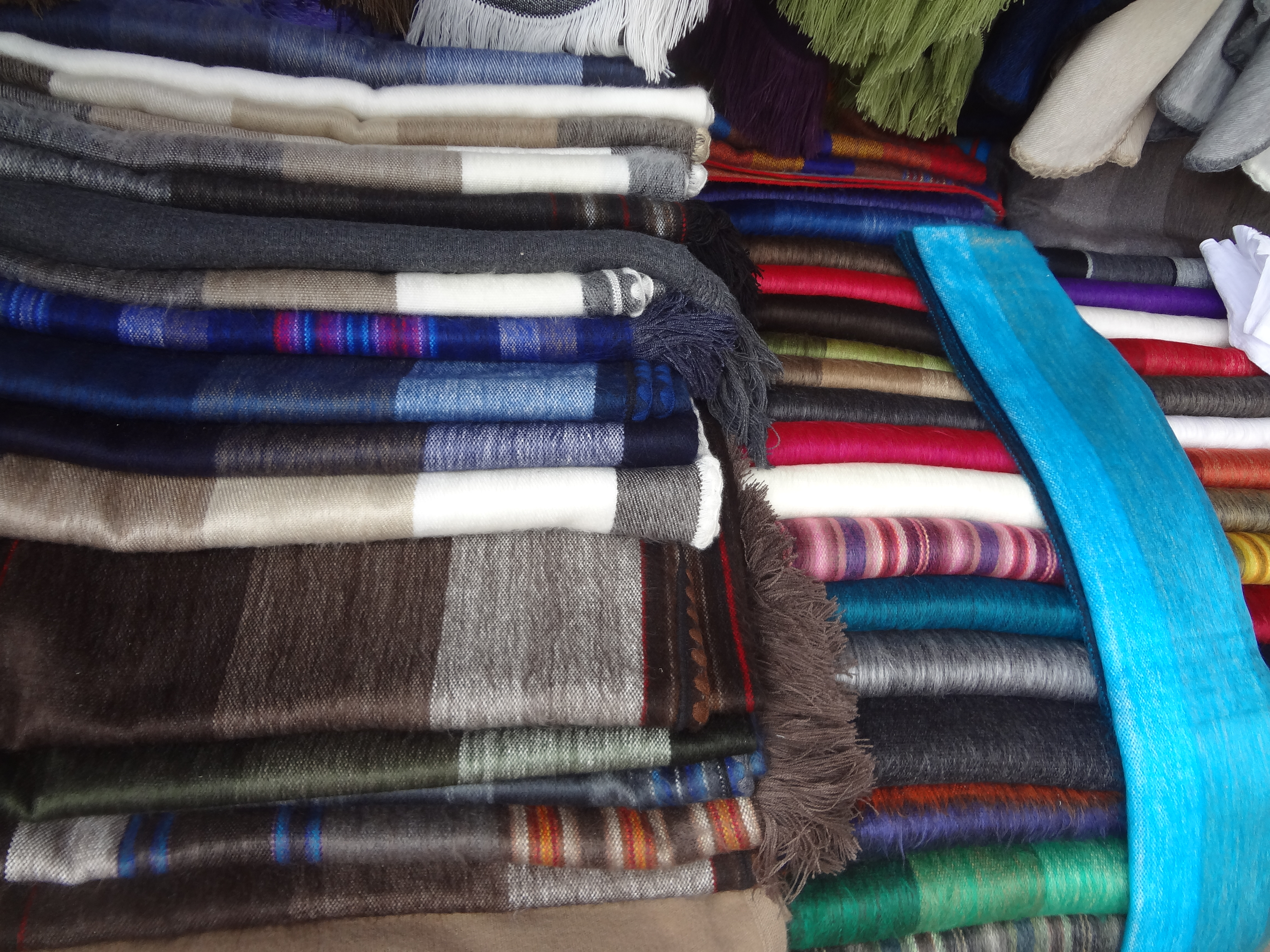
Alpaca scarves at the Otavalo Artisan Market in the Andes Mountains of Ecuador

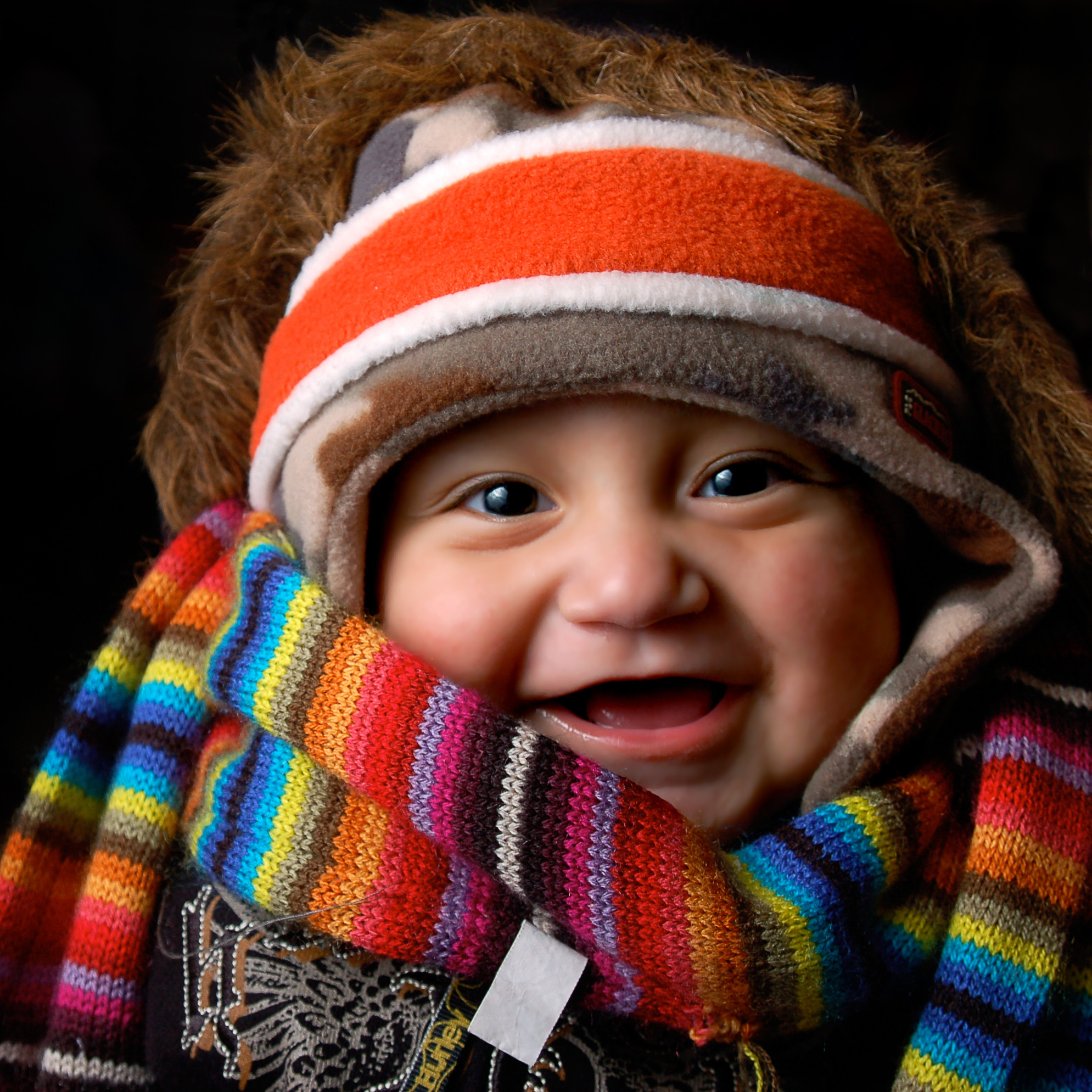
Baby in heavy winter clothing including a woollen scarf

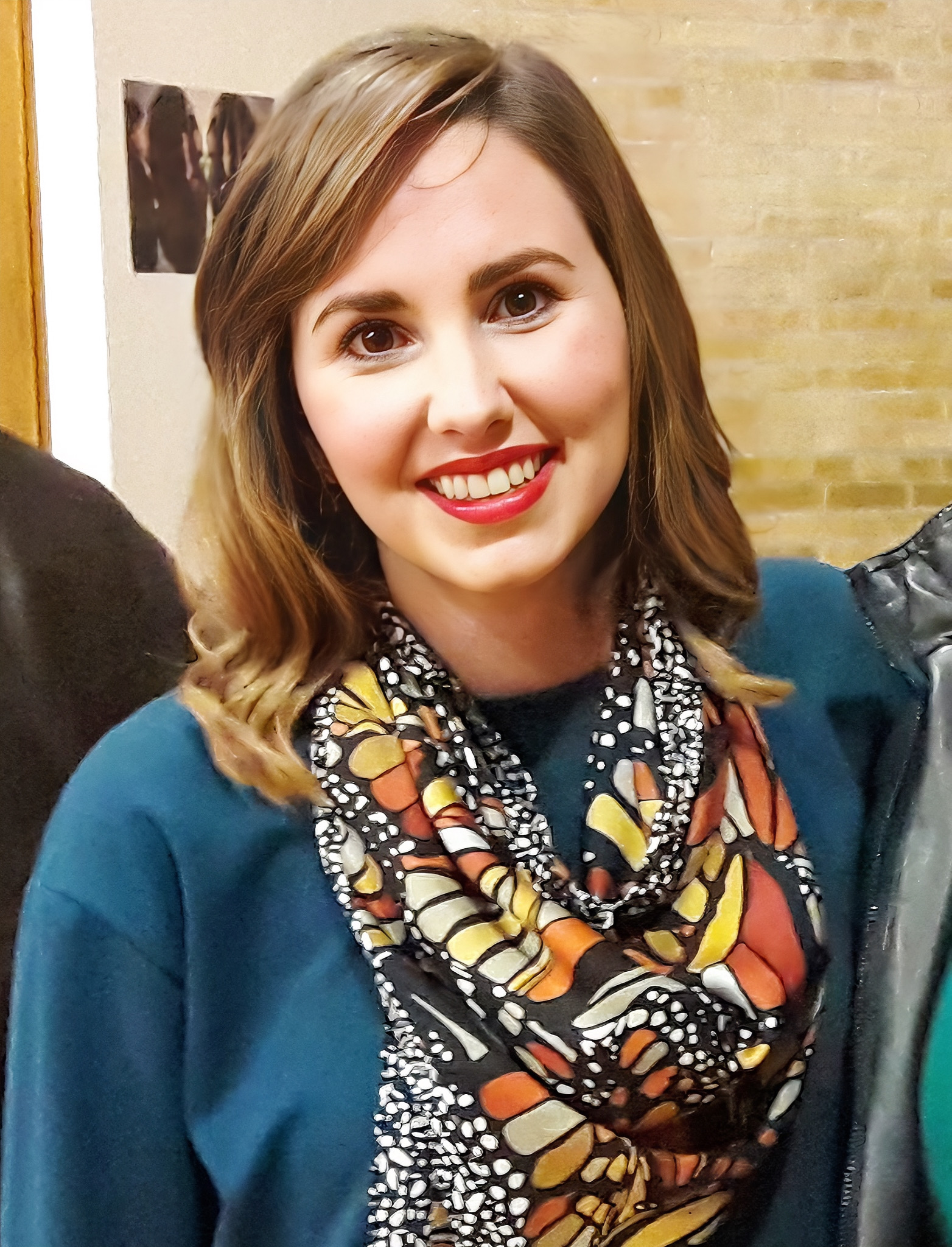
Mexican woman wearing a scarf

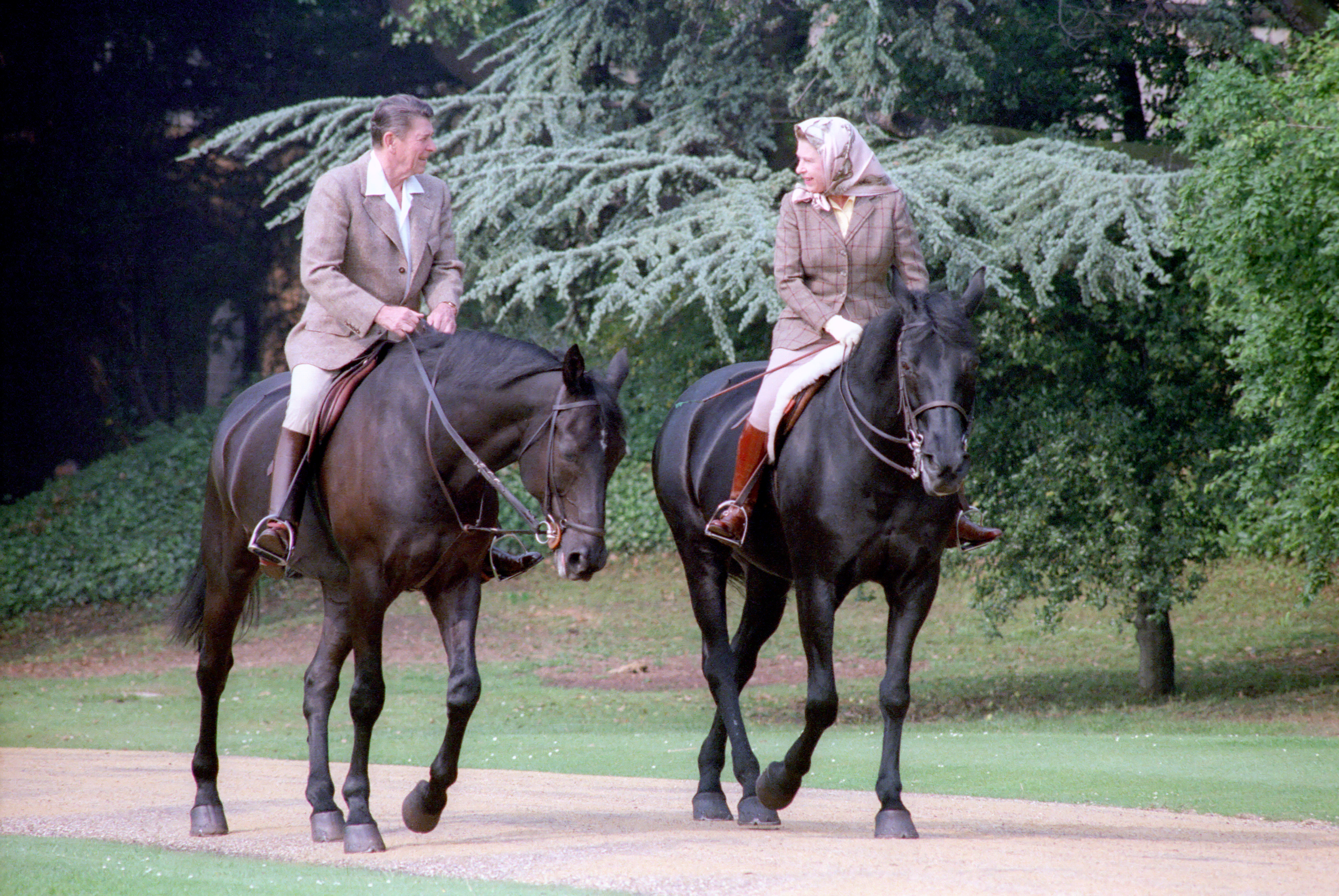
Queen Elizabeth II wearing a headscarf with Ronald Reagan, 1982

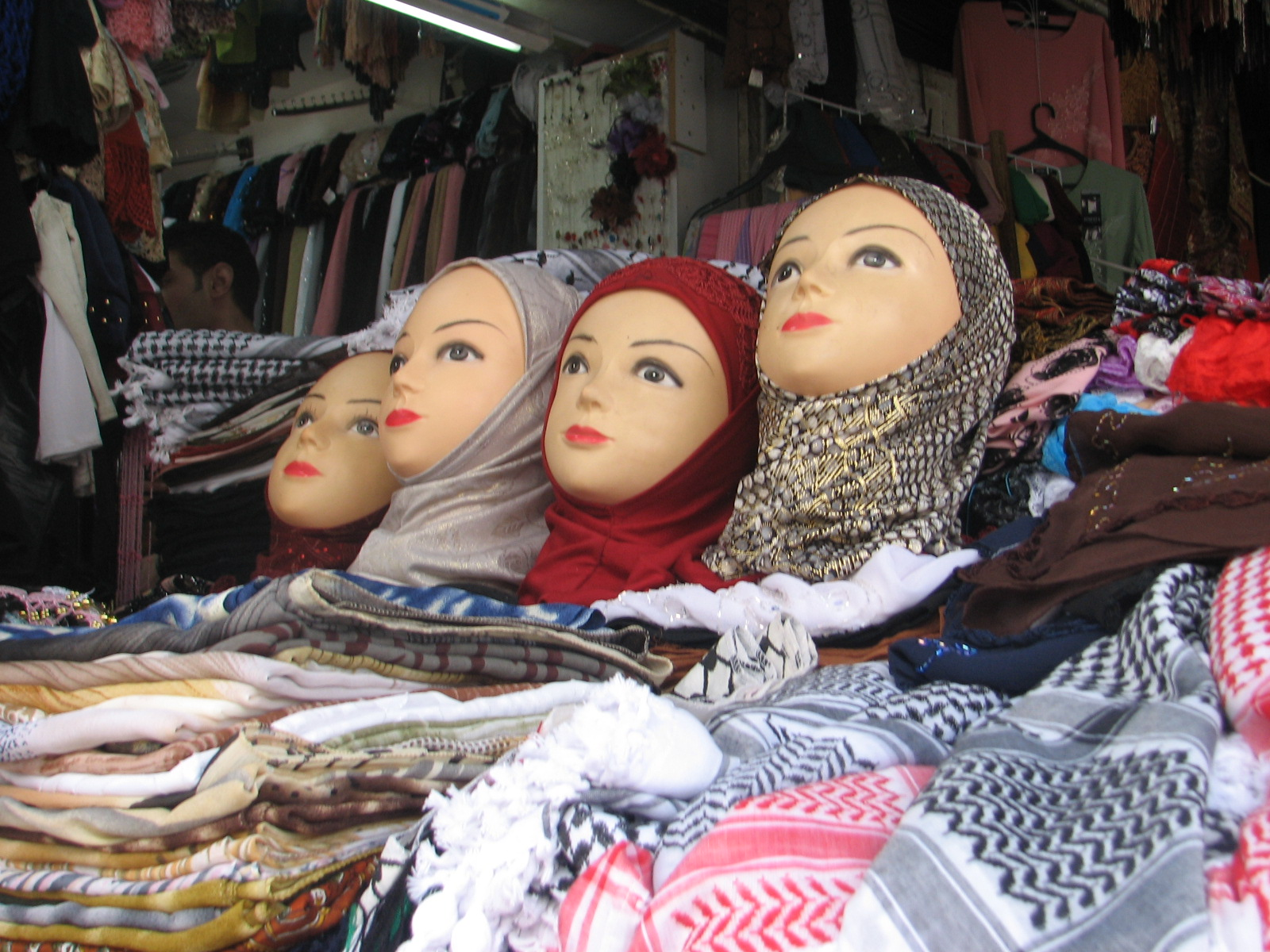
Women's headscarves for sale in Damascus

== See also ==
- Bandana
- Dupatta
- Headscarf
- Krama
- Shawl
- Yellow Scarves Rebellion
