= Utah State University =

Public university in Logan, Utah, US

- Seal of Utah State University
- Former names: Agricultural College of Utah (1888–1929); Utah State Agricultural College (1929–1957); Utah State University of Agriculture and Applied Science (1957–2000)
- Type: Public land-grant research university
- Established: March 8, 1888; 138 years ago
- Parent institution: Utah System of Higher Education
- Accreditation: NWCCU
- Academic affiliations: APLU; ORAU; UCAR; Space-grant
- Endowment: $616.7 million (2025)
- Budget: $1.4 billion (FY2025)
- President: Brad L. Mortensen
- Provost: Chris D. Corcoran
- Faculty: 1,308 FTE (fall 2025)
- Total staff: 6,501 FTE (fall 2025)
- Students: 32,286 (fall 2026)
- Undergraduates: 29,046 (fall 2026)
- Postgraduates: 3,240 (fall 2026)
- Location: Logan, Utah, United States; 41°44′33″N 111°48′45″W
- Campus: 600 acres (2.4 km^{2}) (main campus) 6,896 acres (27.91 km^{2}) (all campuses); Small city
- Other campuses: Price (USU Eastern); Blanding; 11 regional campuses
- Newspaper: The Utah Statesman
- Colors: Navy blue and white
- Nickname: Aggies
- Sporting affiliations: NCAA Division I FBS; Pac-12
- Mascot: Big Blue
- Website: www.usu.edu
- Location in Logan, Utah

Utah State University (USU or Utah State) is a public research university in Logan, Utah, United States. Founded in 1888 as the Agricultural College of Utah under the Morrill Land-Grant Acts, it is Utah's only federal land-grant institution and one of the state's two flagship universities. USU has an expansive statewide reach with 14 separate campuses and over 50 field sites and research centers.

Its main residential campus covers more than 600 acres at the mouth of Logan Canyon, and the university also operates residential campuses in Price and Blanding, regional campuses across the state, and Extension offices in all 29 Utah counties. As of fall 2026, USU enrolled 32,286 students. It has six colleges and a School of Graduate Studies and offers associate, bachelor's, master's, education specialist, and doctoral degrees, including hybrid and online programs. Its Huntsman School of Business, founded in 1889, is the oldest college of business in the United States west of the Mississippi River, and its College of Veterinary Medicine is the state's first four-year veterinary college.

USU is classified among "R1: Doctoral Universities – Very high research activity". In fiscal year 2024, the National Science Foundation ranked it 80th nationally for research and development expenditures ($451 million) and 10th in engineering research expenditures. Its Space Dynamics Laboratory (SDL) is one of the Department of Defense's University Affiliated Research Centers, and the Utah Water Research Laboratory is one of the oldest and largest water research facilities in the United States.

Most Logan students live away from home, and campus traditions include becoming a "True Aggie" and getting Aggie Ice Cream from the university's creamery. Utah State's athletic teams, the Utah State Aggies, compete in NCAA Division I as members of the Pac-12 Conference, which they joined in 2026. Notable alumni include Nobel laureate Lars Peter Hansen, former U.S. Senate Majority Leader Harry Reid, and Utah Governor Spencer Cox.

== History ==
=== Founding and early years (1862–1890) ===
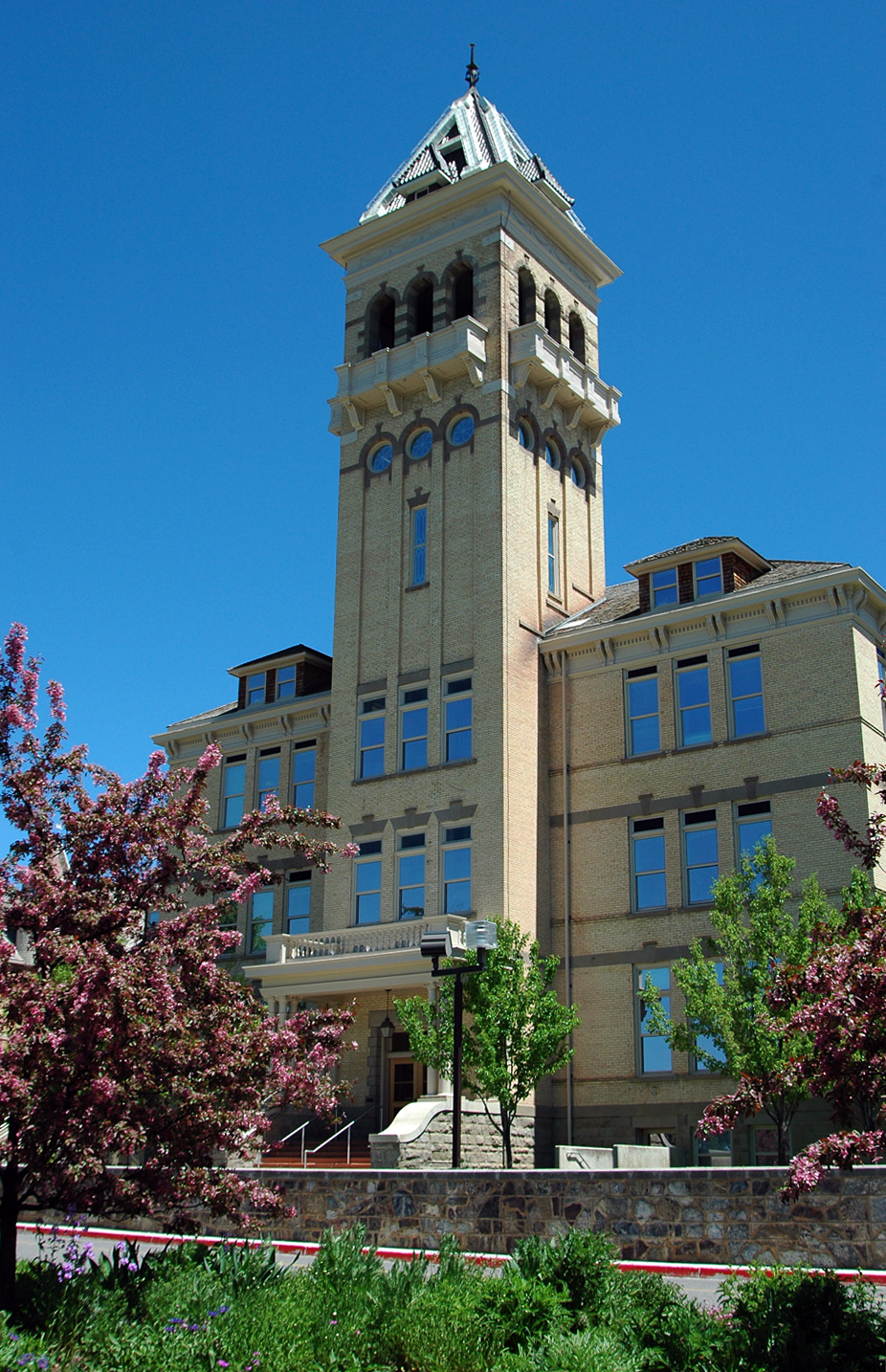
Old Main, completed in 1890, is the university's oldest building and houses administrative offices and academic departments.

The territorial legislature believed that a land-grant college under the 1862 Morrill Act would strengthen Utah's bid for statehood. After visiting rural agricultural folk schools in Denmark in 1885, territorial legislator Anthon H. Lund introduced the 1888 bill to establish an agricultural college and experiment station. USU's original mission was to provide education in agriculture, mechanical arts, science, classical studies, military science, later expanding to include degree programs in liberal arts, business, fine arts, education, human services, humanities, veterinary medicine and engineering.

After a period of political debate in which Salt Lake City retained the territorial university, Cache County legislators, backed by Weber County delegates, won a floor fight to locate the agricultural college in Cache Valley. On March 8, 1888, the Agricultural College of Utah was chartered as the state's land-grant institution. The college opened its doors on September 2, 1890, with 14-year-old Vendla Berntson enrolled as its first student.

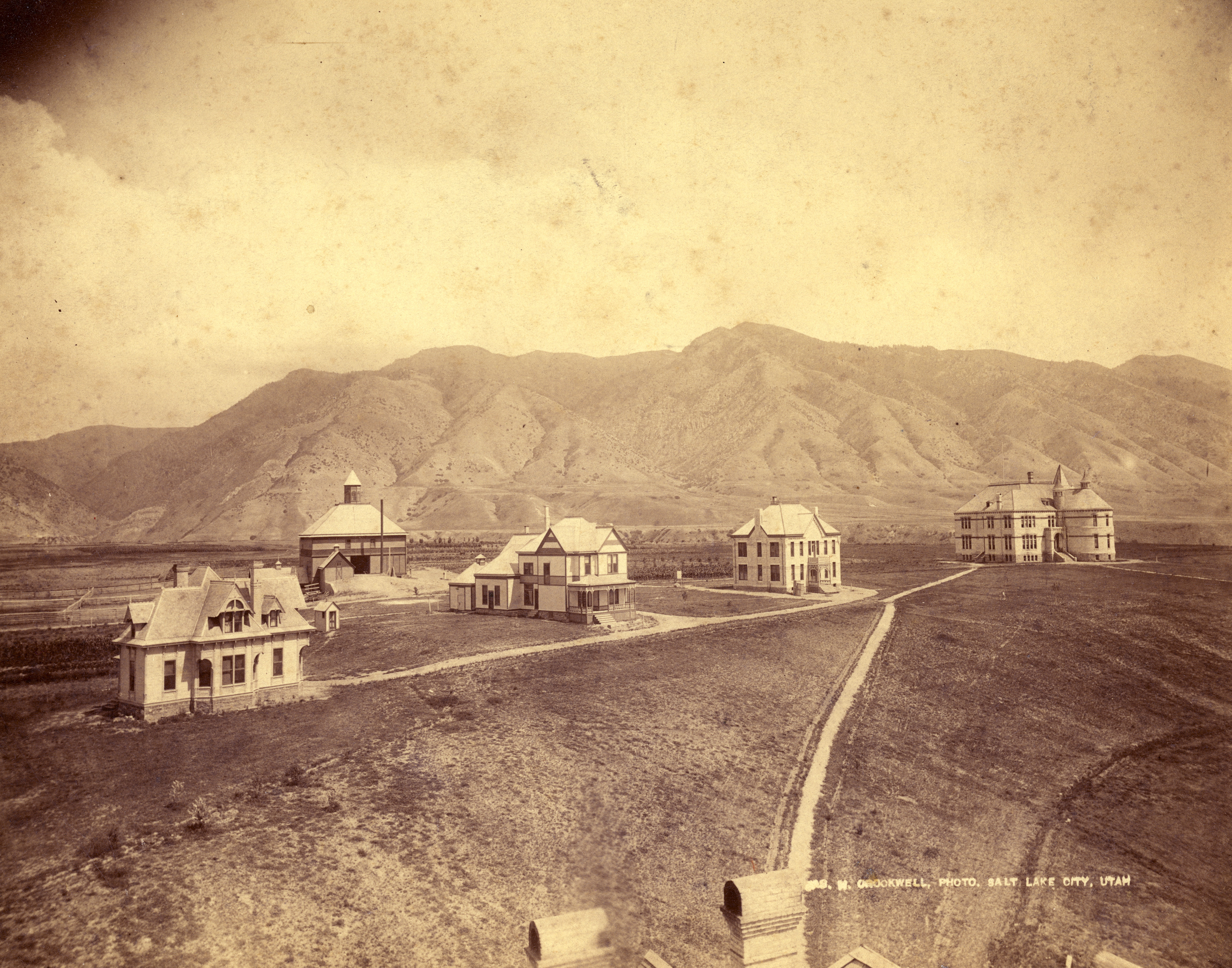
The Agricultural College of Utah in 1892.

The new college was chartered to provide instruction in "agriculture, domestic science, and the mechanic arts." Early expansion under President William J. Kerr drew opposition from supporters of the University of Utah, who feared that any expansion at the college would come at the university's expense. A 1905 law barred the college from offering courses in engineering, liberal arts, pedagogy, law, or medicine, and in 1907 a bill to merge the two schools passed the state Senate but fell short of the two-thirds majority needed in the House. The legislature gradually lifted these restrictions, and by the 1920s the college had regained broad academic autonomy.

=== Growth and wartime (1914–1945) ===
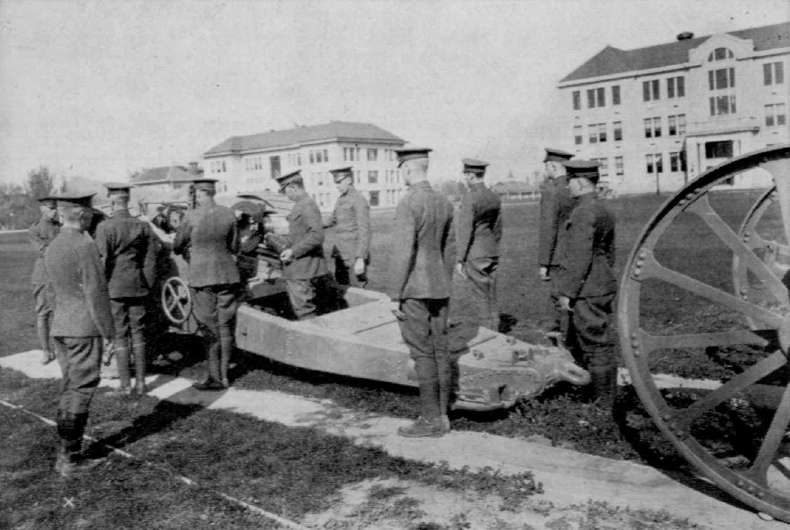
Military personnel with an 8-inch howitzer drill on the Quad, c. 1922.

The college launched its statewide Extension Service in 1914, the same year it awarded its first master's degree. During World War I, Utah Agricultural College became a training site for the Student Army Training Corps, which prepared students for military service while continuing their studies.

Under President Elmer George Peterson, the college expanded significantly, and its Reserve Officers' Training Corps (ROTC) program gained national prominence, earning the nickname "West Point of the West." During World War II, Utah State hosted one of the Navy's primary schools for radio technicians in the Electronics Training Program. The school opened in March 1942, graduated about 100 students a month, and closed in August 1944. Utah State's technical and military training programs during World War II helped position the university for later federal research partnerships in electronics and defense, relationships that eventually led to the establishment of the Space Dynamics Laboratory.

=== Post-war expansion (1946–1980) ===
Romney Stadium (now Maverik Stadium), which opened in 1968, pictured in 2006

After the war, enrollment surged as returning veterans were supported by the GI Bill. Four presidents served between 1945 and 1954, a period historian Robert Parson called “demanding and convulsive.” In March 1952, the Board of Trustees requested an outside survey, the Kelly Survey, to ensure the college used state funds efficiently. The report, published in January 1953, defined the board's role as setting policy and the president's as running the institution; it criticized the board. Following the report, the board fired President Louis L. Madsen, prompting protests by students who felt the survey's recommendations had not been carried out.

President Daryl Chase led Utah State from 1954 to 1968, during a period Parson describes as the institution's transition from college to university. In 1957, Governor George D. Clyde, a former dean of engineering at the college, signed the proclamation renaming the institution Utah State University of Agriculture and Applied Science; the Legislature shortened its legal name to Utah State University in 2000. From 1954 through 1968, enrollment increased by more than 250 percent, research funding by 400 percent, and international enrollment by 800 percent. The faculty expanded from 370 to 600 members.

Until 1955, most campus research was conducted at the Utah Agricultural Experiment Station. However, post-World War II research funding became available, and the college formed a Division of Research to apply for funding, mainly from the National Institutes of Health and the Atomic Energy Commission. D. Wynne Thorne became the first vice president for research in 1965, and the university opened a series of research units, including the Electrodynamics Laboratory (1959), which engineering professor Doran Baker helped establish, the Ecology Center (1966), and the Center for Research in Aeronomy (1969). The Utah Water Research Laboratory, first proposed in 1951, was authorized by the Utah Legislature in 1959 and dedicated in 1965, and the Utah State University Research Foundation was organized in 1966.

The physical campus grew with enrollment, from a building value of $8.1 million in 1954 to almost $50 million in 1968. The Chase Fine Arts Center was completed and dedicated in 1967. The following year, Utah State completed construction on the 20,000-seat Romney Stadium (now Maverik Stadium) where its football team would play games. Following President Chase's tenure, Glen L. Taggart served as president from 1968 through his retirement in 1979. Highlights of his presidency include efforts to decentralize the university budget to departments, establish tenure and promotion guidelines for faculty, and respond to student unrest diplomatically rather than with force.

Utah State's international work grew out of its agricultural expertise. In 1939, Franklin S. Harris, a former director of the college's Agricultural Experiment Station, became agricultural adviser to Iran and brought two of the college's scientists to survey the country's needs. The college signed its first contract with the Iranian government in 1951, and 51 Utah State scientists and advisers served in Iran between 1951 and 1963. Under Chase, the university added programs with the Peace Corps and the United States Agency for International Development. In 1967, USU joined the University of California, Davis and Colorado State University as charter members of what became the Consortium for International Development, which was based on the Logan campus for 20 years. By 1977, Iranian students made up nearly 30 percent of the university's international enrollment; after the 1979 Iran hostage crisis, Middle Eastern enrollment fell from 356 students in 1980 to 51 in 1989.

=== Statewide growth (1980–2010) ===
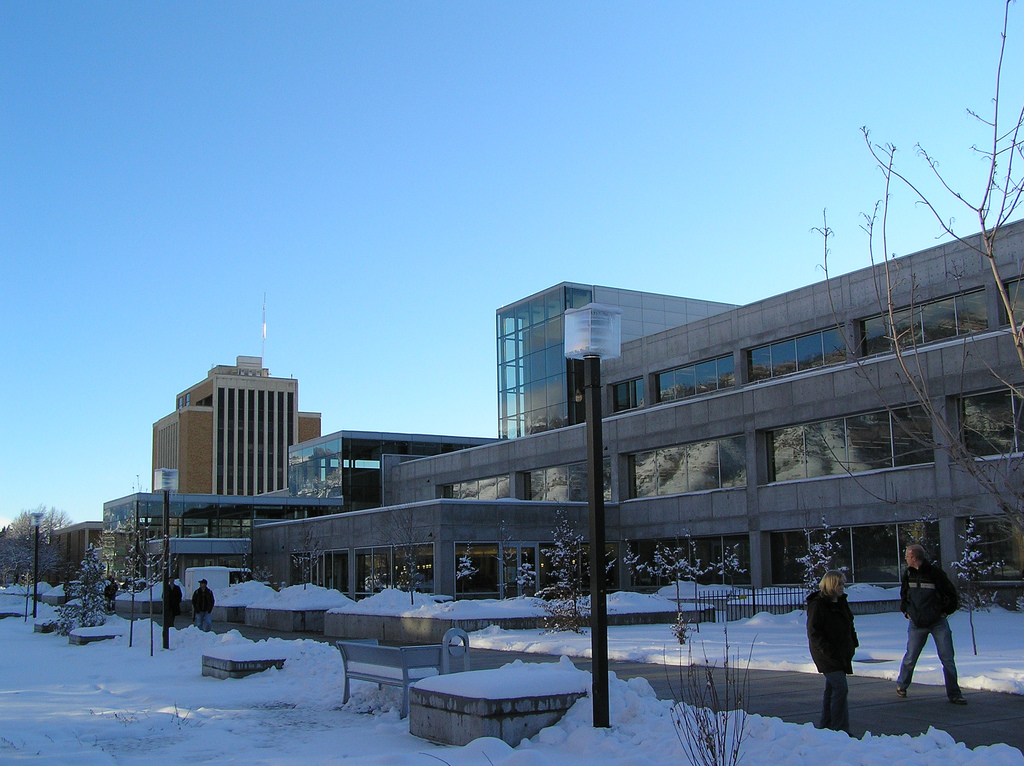
The Merrill-Cazier Library, completed in 2005

The earliest roots of USU's distance education go back to the early 1900s, when USU professors traveled by train from Logan to Burley, Idaho to deliver dairy lectures. In 1967, Utah State established the Uintah Basin Center for Continuing Education in Roosevelt, the forerunner of USU-Uintah Basin. The following year, "flying professors" traveled weekly to teach at USU's various campuses and centers. Traveling from the centers was necessary until Utah State installed satellite systems in 1996. In 2006, university president Stan Albrecht moved Utah State University's Continuing Education unit to the Provost's Office and established the USU Regional Campuses and Distance Education organization. The system grew in 2010 with the addition of USU Eastern.

By the late 20th century, Utah State sought to broaden its national reach beyond its regional mission. Under President George H. Emert (1992–2000), the university's endowment grew from $7 million to nearly $80 million,

Under Albrecht, Utah State expanded its research partnerships and global collaborations, including initiatives in China, Saudi Arabia, and Peru. The Merrill-Cazier Library opened in 2005, followed by several new research and classroom facilities. In 2010, USU also acquired the Swaner Preserve and EcoCenter near Park City.

=== Recent history (2010–present) ===
The Regional Campuses and Distance Education Building in Logan, completed in 2012

The USU system includes USU Blanding, USU Eastern, multiple regional campuses, several extension and field site locations, 14 statewide research farms, and 29 additional statewide extension offices. In 2012, RCDE completed construction of the Regional Campuses Distance Education (RCDE) Building which houses broadcast classrooms, RCDE offices, and the Utah Education Network.

In 2012, USU concluded a nine-year fundraising campaign that raised nearly $513 million, exceeding its $400 million goal.

Noelle E. Cockett, USU's first female president, served from 2017 to 2023, expanding statewide programs and research capacity while addressing campus safety and inclusion. She was succeeded by Elizabeth R. Cantwell (2023–2025), who left in 2025 to lead Washington State University. State auditors later faulted spending during her tenure, and a January 2026 legislative audit found "severe noncompliance" with state spending and procurement rules. Lawmakers withheld part of USU's state funding until February 2026, when they released the remaining $8.8 million.

Following an interim term under Alan L. Smith, the Utah Board of Higher Education appointed Brad L. Mortensen, former president of Weber State University, as Utah State's 18th president on October 30, 2025. He took office on November 10, 2025.

== Campus and locations ==
In addition to its Main Campus in Logan, Utah State University operates a system of 13 separate state-wide campuses (including 3 residential campuses); Utah State Extension offices in all 29 counties, 14 separate research farms, and seven (7) additional field site locations throughout Utah. USU's campuses, research farms and field sites total 6,896 acres.

=== Logan campus ===
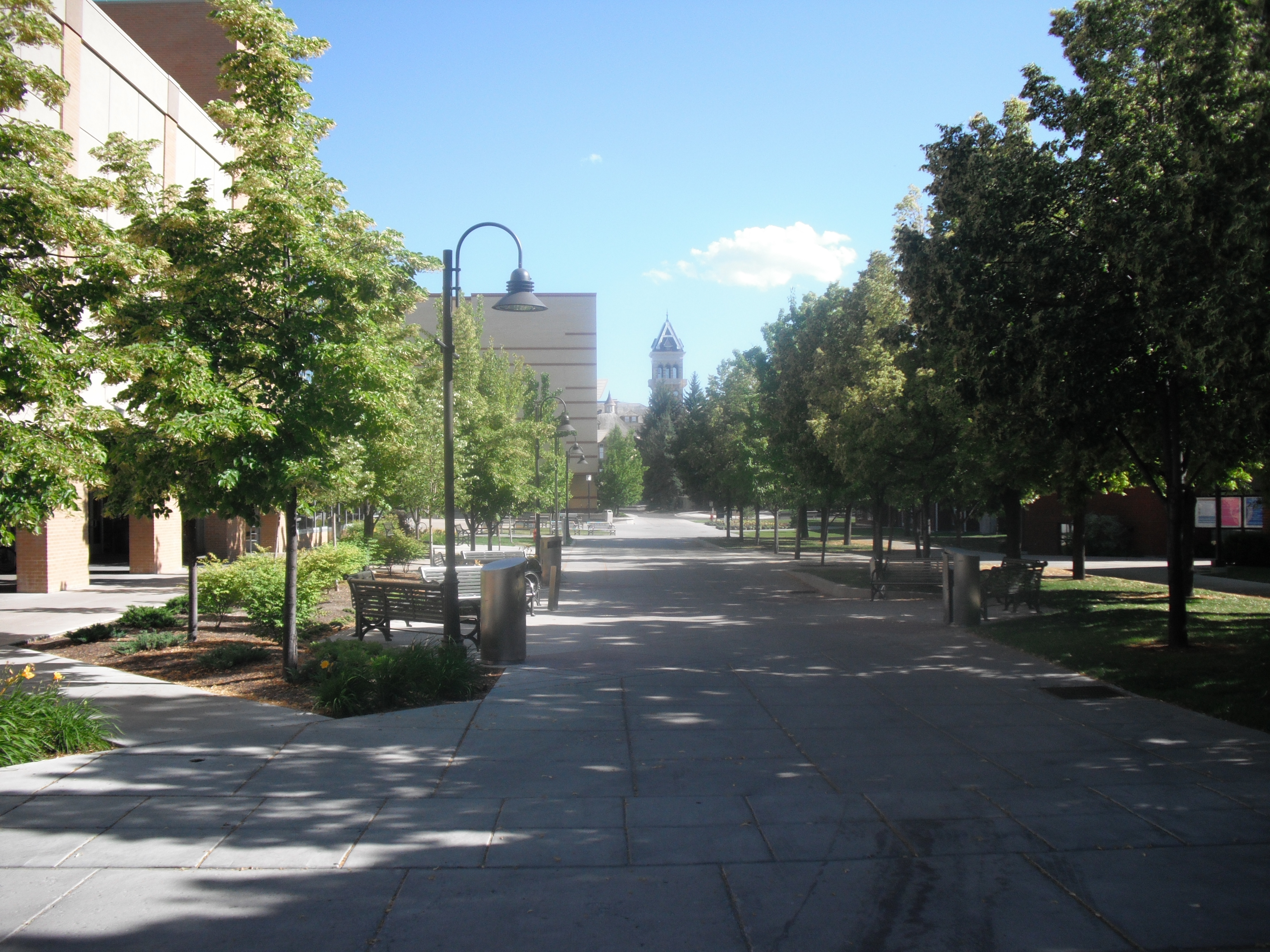
Old Main from outside the Taggart Student Center

Utah State University's main academic, research, residential, athletic, and innovation campus is located in Logan, Utah, spanning over 600 acres at the mouth of Logan Canyon. The campus sits on a "bench," a shelf-like foothill overlooking Cache Valley to the west, with Mount Logan and the Bear River Range rising sharply to the east.

The campus has more than 100 buildings. Key facilities include Maverik Stadium, the Dee Glen Smith Spectrum, Old Main (the university's first building), the Merrill-Cazier Library (304,000 square feet), and the Manon Caine Russell-Kathryn Caine Wanlass Performance Hall.

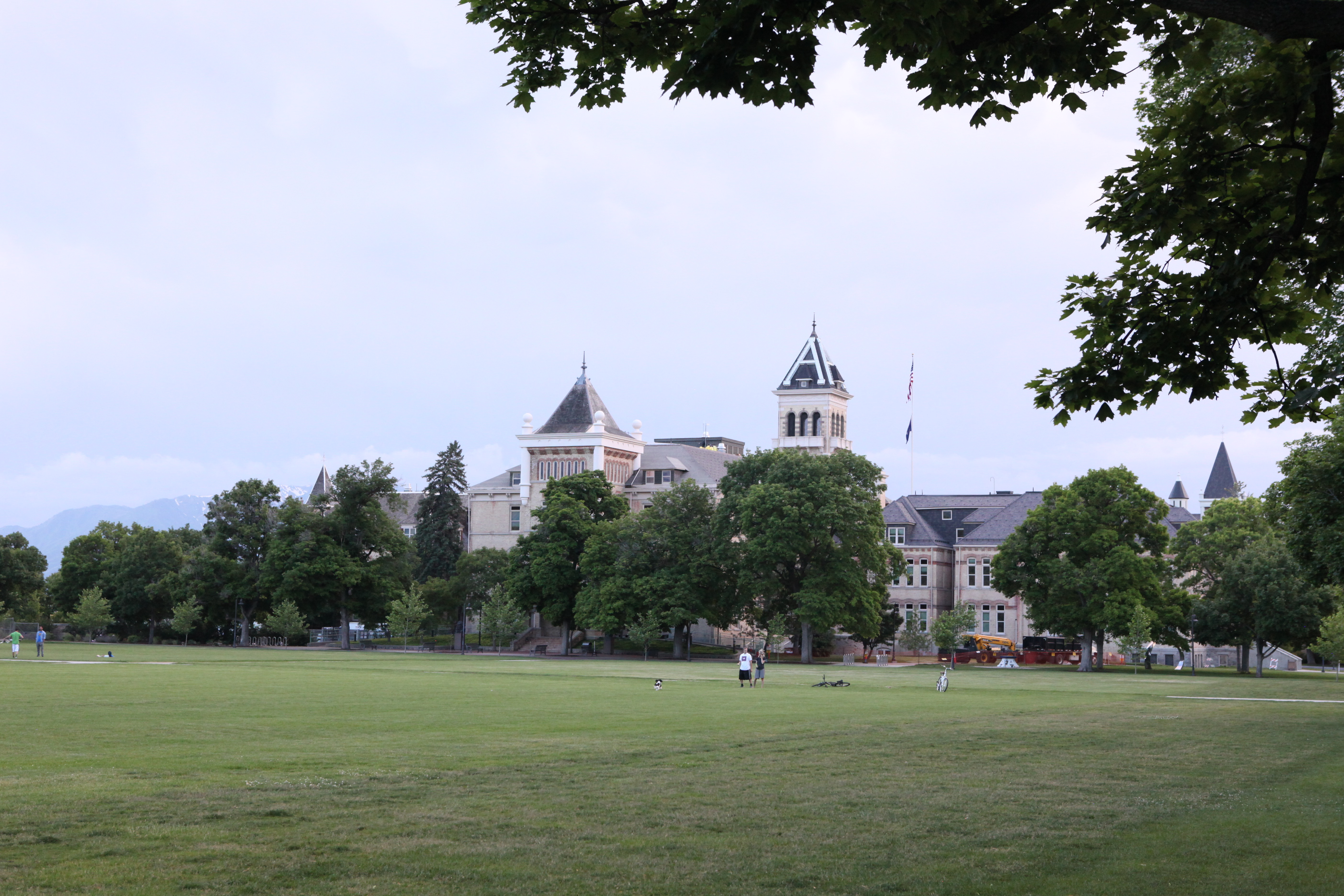
Utah State University's quad during the summer

The Logan City Cemetery divides much of the campus, with the main academic buildings to the south and the innovation and research facilities to the north. The campus also includes residential, recreational, and athletic buildings. To the west and north are located the Dee Glen Smith Spectrum and Merlin Olsen Field at Maverik Stadium. Students have full access to the HPER (pronounced "hyper"), Nelson Fieldhouse, and the 117,000-sq-ft ARC (Aggie Recreation Center) exercise facilities, which include basketball courts, indoor rock climbing, gymnastics equipment, two swimming pools, racquetball, squash, and outdoor field space for lacrosse, rugby, soccer, ultimate, and other sports.

With more than 30 of Utah's largest tree species and more than 7,000 trees, Utah State University's Logan campus has earned international recognition as an arboretum, accredited by ArbNet. USU's main campus in Logan, Utah, and the city of Logan have received several accolades, including being named the "Best College Town" for the 2019–2020 school year and "Most Beautiful Campus in Utah." Adjacent to the campus are Logan Canyon and the Uinta-Wasatch-Cache National Forest, which offer opportunities for hiking, camping, and skiing. Logan Canyon also serves as the main route to Beaver Mountain Ski Resort and Bear Lake. Students often visit these nearby areas for recreational activities such as kayaking, paddleboarding, fishing, and skiing. The USU Outdoor Recreation Program supports these activities by renting equipment for camping, water sports, mountain sports, and winter sports, as well as providing trail maps and local expertise.

Several notable sites are located on or near campus property. First Dam is a small research reservoir at the mouth of Logan Canyon, where students can paddleboard, kayak, and fish. The Logan Country Club, adjacent to the campus, is home to the university's men's golf team. Additionally, the Utah Water Research Laboratory is a key research facility near Logan Canyon.

In the broader region, students have access to other ski resorts, such as Powder Mountain and Cherry Peak Resort, as well as local golf courses, lakes, and reservoirs, including Hyrum Reservoir at Hyrum State Park. Many students take advantage of Utah's YETI ski pass, which allows limited access to all of Utah's ski resorts. Nearby attractions include Yellowstone National Park, Grand Teton National Park, and Lava Hot Springs.

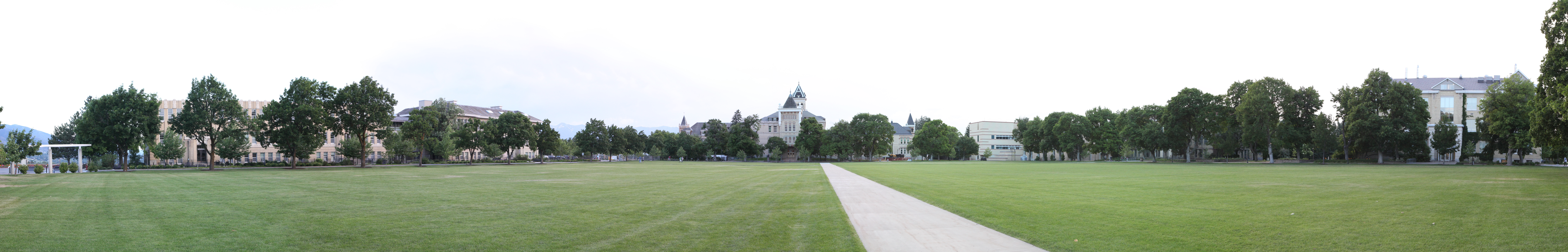
Panoramic view of the Quad

=== Statewide campuses and extension ===
USU Statewide Campuses works to fulfill work to fulfill USU's land-grant mission to increase access to high-quality education throughout Utah. Logan is one of many cities and towns hosting a statewide campus for Utah State. Its campuses include:

- Main Campus: Logan
- Other Residential Campuses: USU Eastern (Price), USU Blanding
- Other Regional Campuses: Brigham City, Kaysville, Moab, Monument Valley, Orem, Roosevelt, Salt Lake City, St. George, Tooele, Tremonton, Vernal

Utah State University has conducted studies and proposed long-term development master plans for the state of Utah, which have been approved in concept to create residential and research campuses at each of its additional campuses throughout the State.

In addition to its main campus in Logan, Utah State operates two separate residential campuses: one in Price (USU Eastern) and another in Blanding, Utah. Located in Price, Utah, the former College of Eastern Utah joined the USU system in 2010 and became Utah State University College of Eastern Utah (USU Eastern). In 2013, the official name was shortened to Utah State University Eastern, as it was officially designated as a campus of Utah State University. USU Eastern is the only campus besides Logan to have an athletics program; and, competes as the USU Eastern Eagles.

USU instructional office extension locations are also located in every county in Utah including Beaver, Bicknell, Blanding, Brigham City, Castle Dale, Cedar City, Delta, Ephraim, Heber City, Junction, Kanab, Kaysville, Logan, Moab, Montezuma Creek, Monticello, Monument Valley, Nephi, Orem, Panguitch, Park City, Price, Richfield, Roosevelt, Salt Lake City, St. George, Tooele, Tremonton, Vernal, and Wendover. Courses and degrees are also made available online through online, international, and Distance Education.

USU operates several centers and field sites statewide, including 14 research farms. Its agricultural and equine sites include the Bastian Agricultural Center in South Jordan, which offers equestrian and agricultural education and event facilities, and the Sam Skaggs Family Equine Education Center in Wellsville, which houses instruction and research in equine sciences. Its gardens include the USU Botanical Center in Kaysville, with teaching gardens, extension classrooms, an amphitheater and wetlands, and the Ogden Botanical Gardens in Ogden. USU also offers research and education programs at Thanksgiving Point in Lehi, a nonprofit with botanical gardens, an arboretum and museums. Its aviation and flight technology programs are based at Logan-Cache Airport, where the university keeps its aircraft. In Park City, the Swaner Preserve and EcoCenter includes a 1,200-acre (4.9 km^{2}) land trust and a 10,000-square-foot (930 m^{2}) education center focused on wetlands, wildlife and sustainability, which is LEED Platinum certified.

=== Sustainability ===
The university signed the American College and University Presidents' Climate Commitment in 2007, pledging carbon neutrality by 2050. In 2019, the Faculty Senate passed a non-binding resolution calling for deeper emissions reductions, and the university formed a greenhouse gas reduction committee in response. By 2021, USU had nearly completed a project to replace old light fixtures with energy-efficient LED bulbs at all of its campuses, saving almost 6 million kilowatt-hours of electricity and 3,500 metric tons of carbon emissions annually. USU's Office of Sustainability was elevated under the Office of the President in 2023.

The Decarbonization Master Plan (2022) established a roadmap to achieve net-zero emissions on the Logan campus by 2040. The plan recommends converting the campus's central steam system to low-temperature hydronic heating, installing domestic-water heat pumps in 75 buildings, and expanding solar generation to 8.4 MW by 2040. In 2026, USU completed more than 2 MW of new solar capacity at seven locations, including its first large-scale battery storage system at the Uintah Basin campus in Vernal. According to the FY 2023 Greenhouse Gas Inventory, USU's total emissions were 106,126 metric tons of CO₂e, a 3 percent decline from 2008. All new construction at Utah State is built to LEED Silver standards or higher. As of 2025, the university operates 22 LEED-certified buildings emphasizing energy efficiency, indoor air quality, and water conservation.

Initiatives under its 2020 Landscape Resiliency and Drought Plan and Stormwater Management Plan include drought-tolerant plantings, irrigation audits, bioswales, and stormwater capture systems across the Logan campus. Irrigation is managed via a weather-responsive central control system that draws primarily from the Cache Highline Water Association canal. USU Extension's Center for Water-Efficient Landscaping (CWEL) extends these practices statewide through workshops, design research, and the Water Check residential efficiency program.

== Organization and administration ==
Utah State University (USU) is a public research university within the Utah System of Higher Education (USHE). It is Utah's only federal land-grant institution and, with the University of Utah, one of the state's two flagship universities. The institution operates under the supervision of the Utah Board of Higher Education, which sets statewide policy, approves presidential appointments, and oversees budgetary and strategic priorities for Utah's public colleges and universities. USU's local governing body is the Board of Trustees, which provides institutional oversight, approves significant policies and transactions, conducts presidential evaluations, and advises the statewide board on campus matters. Trustees include the university president, appointed members representing the state and community, and ex officio participants as defined by state policy.

The Utah Board of Higher Education appoints the university president. On October 30, 2025, the board named Brad L. Mortensen the 18th president of Utah State University; he began his tenure on November 10, 2025. Day-to-day academic administration is headed by the provost and executive vice president, who oversees the deans of the colleges and schools, graduate education, and statewide academic operations.

Utah State University's academic programs are organized into six colleges and a School of Graduate Studies. In 2025, the Utah Legislature cut USU's state funding by $12.6 million under House Bill 265, which allowed institutions to earn the money back by reinvesting it in high-demand programs. In response, the university merged five colleges into two, effective July 1, 2025: the Caine College of the Arts, the College of Humanities and Social Sciences, and the College of Science became the College of Arts & Sciences, and the College of Agriculture and Applied Sciences and the S.J. & Jessie E. Quinney College of Natural Resources became the S.J. & Jessie E. Quinney College of Agriculture & Natural Resources. Then-interim president Alan Smith said the mergers were intended to improve interdisciplinary collaboration and academic efficiency. The university's other colleges are the Jon M. Huntsman School of Business, the College of Engineering, the College of Veterinary Medicine, and the Emma Eccles Jones College of Education, Health, and Human Sciences. In keeping with its land-grant mission, USU also administers a statewide system of regional campuses, centers, and online programs in coordination with the Office of Statewide Campuses and USU Extension.

USU's operating budget totaled approximately $1.4 billion in fiscal year 2025, reflecting a mix of state appropriations, tuition and fees, research grants and contracts, auxiliaries, and philanthropic support. The university's endowment was valued at approximately $616.7 million as of June 30, 2025, according to NACUBO's annual survey.

== Academics ==
Utah State University offers 418 degrees and certificates. Students can pursue Students can pursue 137 undergraduate, 95 master's, and 39 doctoral programs, along with study abroad in more than 90 countries. As of fall 2026, total enrollment was 32,286 students, including 29,046 undergraduates and 3,240 graduate students. The university has a 19-to-1 student–faculty ratio, with nearly half of its classes enrolling fewer than 20 students.

USU has been accredited by the Northwest Commission on Colleges and Universities since 1924, and the commission reaffirmed its accreditation in 2025. Several programs hold specialized accreditations, including from the American Psychological Association, ABET, and AACSB.

The university participates in national consortia and programs aligned with its research and outreach mission, including Oak Ridge Associated Universities (ORAU), the University Corporation for Atmospheric Research (UCAR), and the Space Grant network, among others.

=== Colleges and schools ===
As of July 1, 2025, Utah State University is organized into six academic colleges and schools, plus the School of Graduate Studies, that collectively oversee the university's teaching, research, and statewide outreach missions. In 1903, the Agricultural College of Utah (now Utah State University) organized six schools: Agriculture, Military Science, Agricultural Engineering and Mechanical Arts, Home Economics, General Science, and Commerce. By 1923, the institution had expanded to seven academic colleges—Agriculture, Home Economics, Military Science, Agricultural Engineering, Commerce and Business Administration, Mechanic Arts, and General Science. A School of Education was created in 1927, and the School of General Science was reorganized into the School of Basic Arts and Sciences.

USU colleges and schools (current)
College or school	Notes
College of Arts & Sciences	Formed July 1, 2025, from the Caine College of the Arts, the College of Humanities & Social Sciences, and the College of Science
College of Engineering	Established 1903
College of Veterinary Medicine	Established 2022; Utah's first four-year veterinary college
Emma Eccles Jones College of Education, Health, and Human Sciences	Established 1927
Jon M. Huntsman School of Business	Established 1889; renamed 2007
S.J. & Jessie E. Quinney College of Agriculture & Natural Resources	Formed July 1, 2025, from the College of Agriculture & Applied Sciences and the Quinney College of Natural Resources
School of Graduate Studies	Coordinates graduate programs across all colleges

In April 2025, USU announced a major academic reorganization in response to state-mandated budget reductions and Utah House Bill 265. The plan merged five existing colleges into two new colleges and reduced administrative overhead, with program adjustments to follow. The new colleges became official on July 1, 2025, with Joe Ward named dean of Arts & Sciences and Grant Cardon serving as interim dean of Agriculture & Natural Resources until Derek McLean became the college's first permanent dean on July 1, 2026. Prior to July 1, 2025, USU's colleges included the Caine College of the Arts, the College of Humanities & Social Sciences, the College of Science, the College of Agriculture & Applied Sciences, and the S.J. & Jessie E. Quinney College of Natural Resources as separate entities.

==== College of Arts & Sciences ====
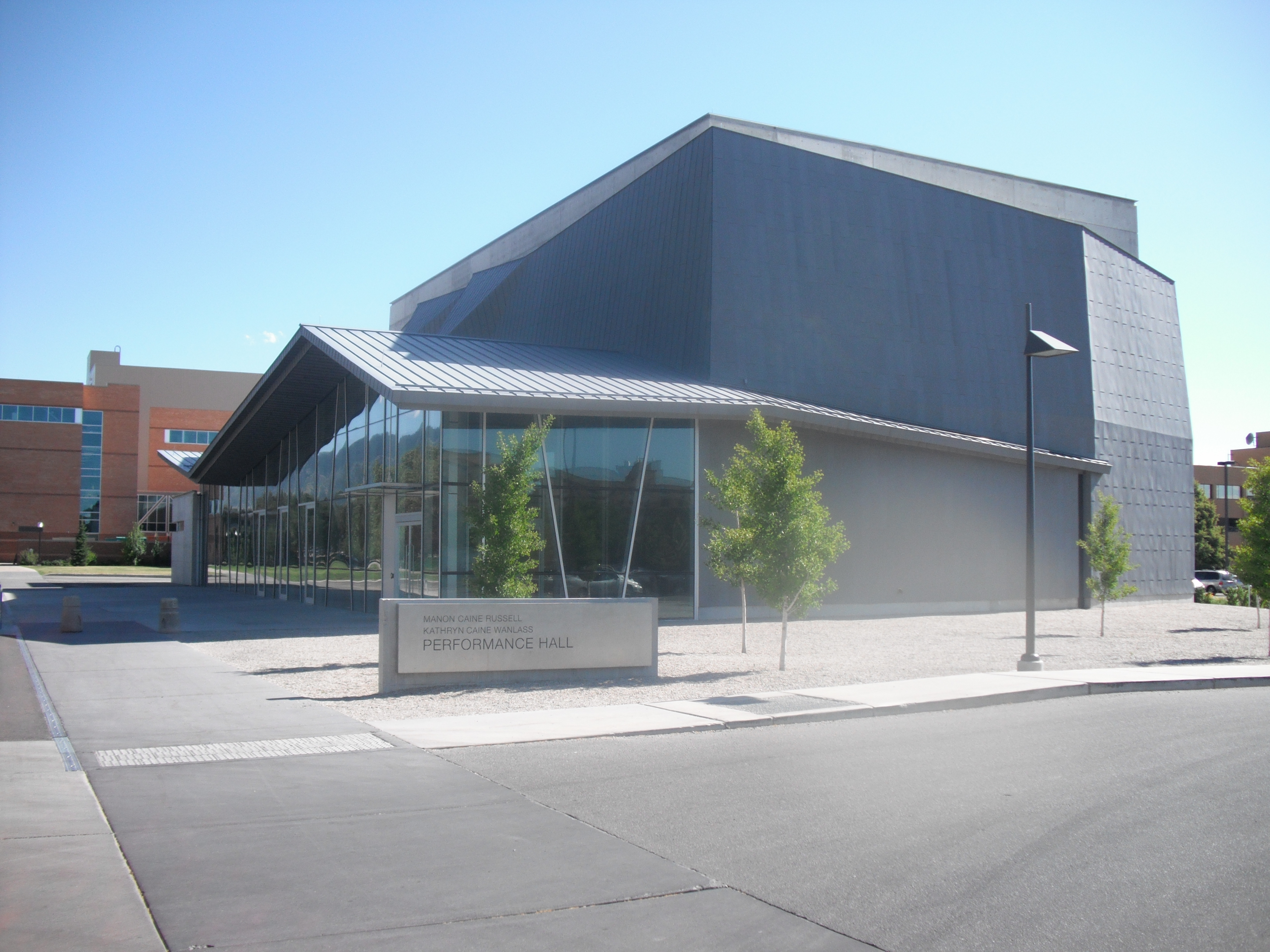
The Manon Caine Russell–Kathryn Caine Wanlass Performance Hall

The College of Arts & Sciences integrates programs from the former Caine College of the Arts, College of Humanities and Social Sciences (CHaSS), and College of Science, aligning with "Letters and Science" models at peer institutions. It comprises departments for (a) the humanities, social sciences, and social work; (b) the natural, physical, and mathematical sciences; and (c) music, theatre, and art and design.

==== College of Engineering ====
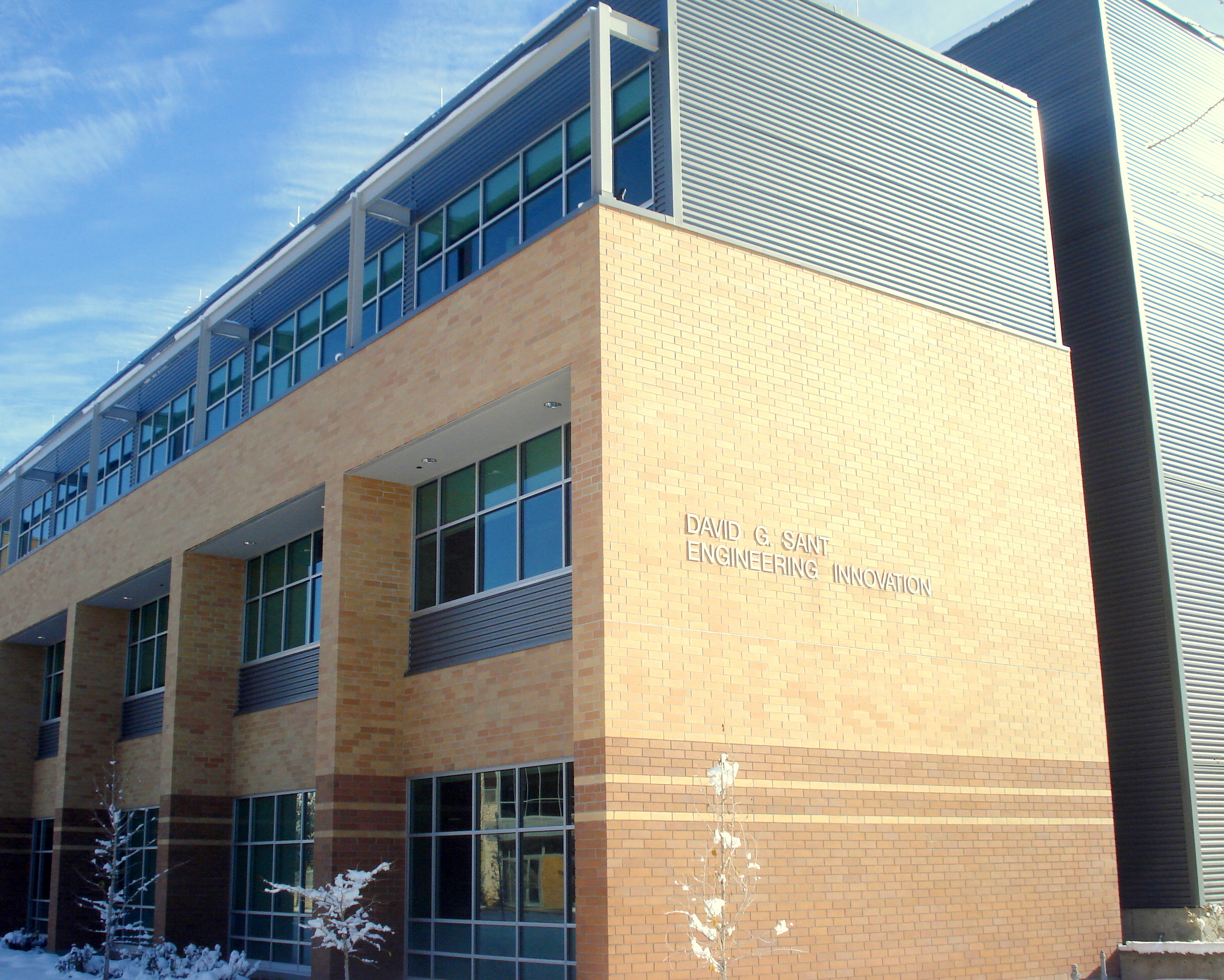
The David G. Sant Engineering Innovation Building

The College of Engineering grants undergraduate degrees in six engineering disciplines—biological, civil, computer, electrical, environmental, and mechanical—and graduate degrees in aerospace, composites/structures, space systems, and engineering education. The college has close ties to the Space Dynamics Laboratory (SDL), which employs about 155 students on technical projects. Research facilities and outreach in the college include the Utah Water Research Laboratory (UWRL), one of the oldest and largest university-based water research facilities in the United States. The college also sponsors an annual trebuchet pumpkin-toss and Engineers Without Borders chapter activities.

==== College of Veterinary Medicine ====
Established in 2022 as Utah's first four-year veterinary college (building on the prior WIMU regional partnership with Washington State University), the college offers the DVM and allied veterinary programs. In August 2025, Utah State welcomed its first cohort into the state's first four-year veterinary degree program.

==== Emma Eccles Jones College of Education, Health, and Human Sciences ====
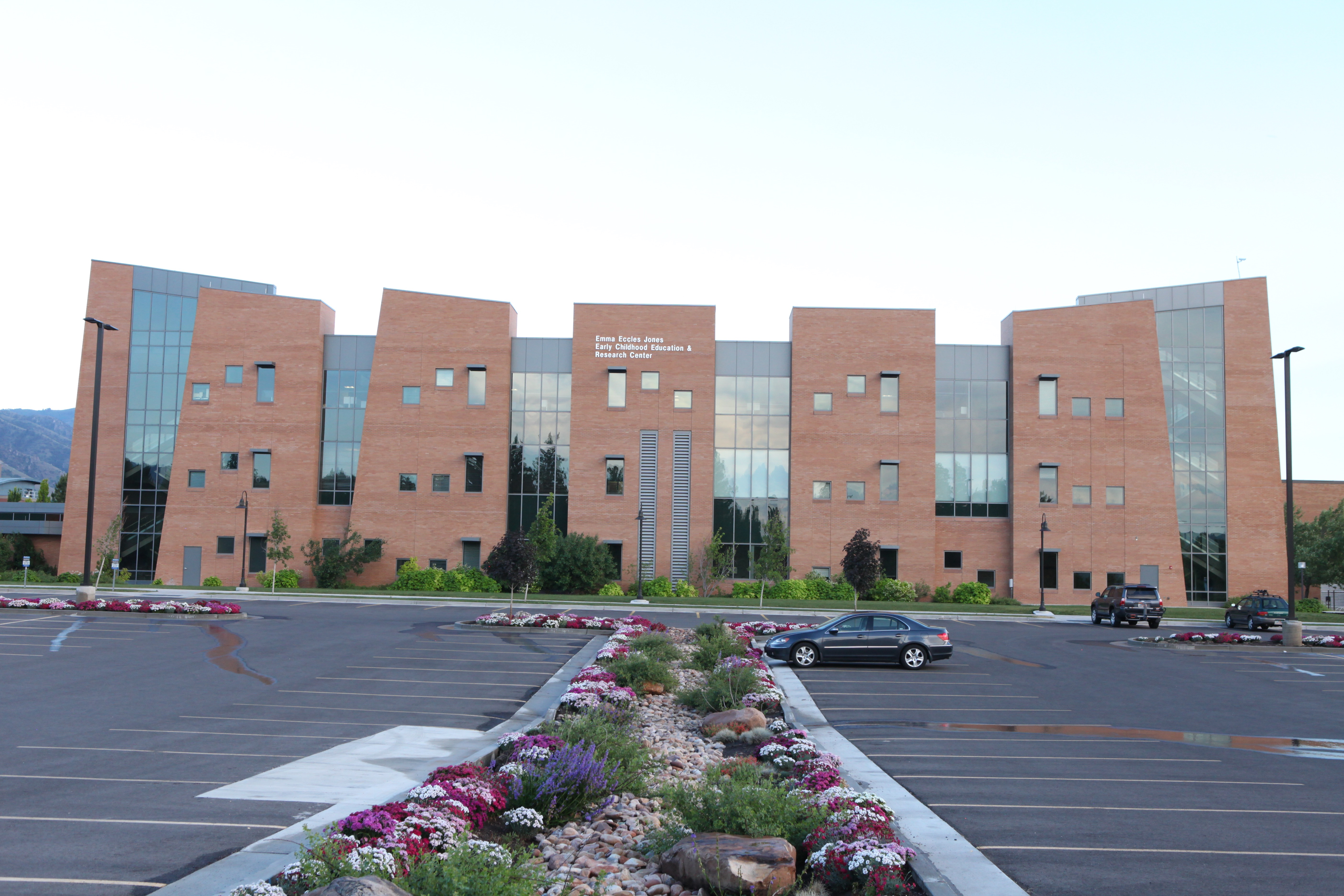
Emma Eccles Jones Early Childhood Education and Research Center (ECERC)

USU's Emma Eccles Jones College of Education, Health, and Human Sciences (founded in 1927) offers programs in psychology, special education, human development and family studies, communicative disorders and deaf education, kinesiology, and rehabilitation. The college includes the APA-accredited Department of Psychology and the National Center for Hearing Assessment and Management (NCHAM). The college also houses the USU Family Life Center which provides housing and financial counseling. Its marriage and family therapy clinic, formerly in the Family Life Center, moved to the Sorenson Center for Clinical Excellence in 2018.

==== Jon M. Huntsman School of Business ====
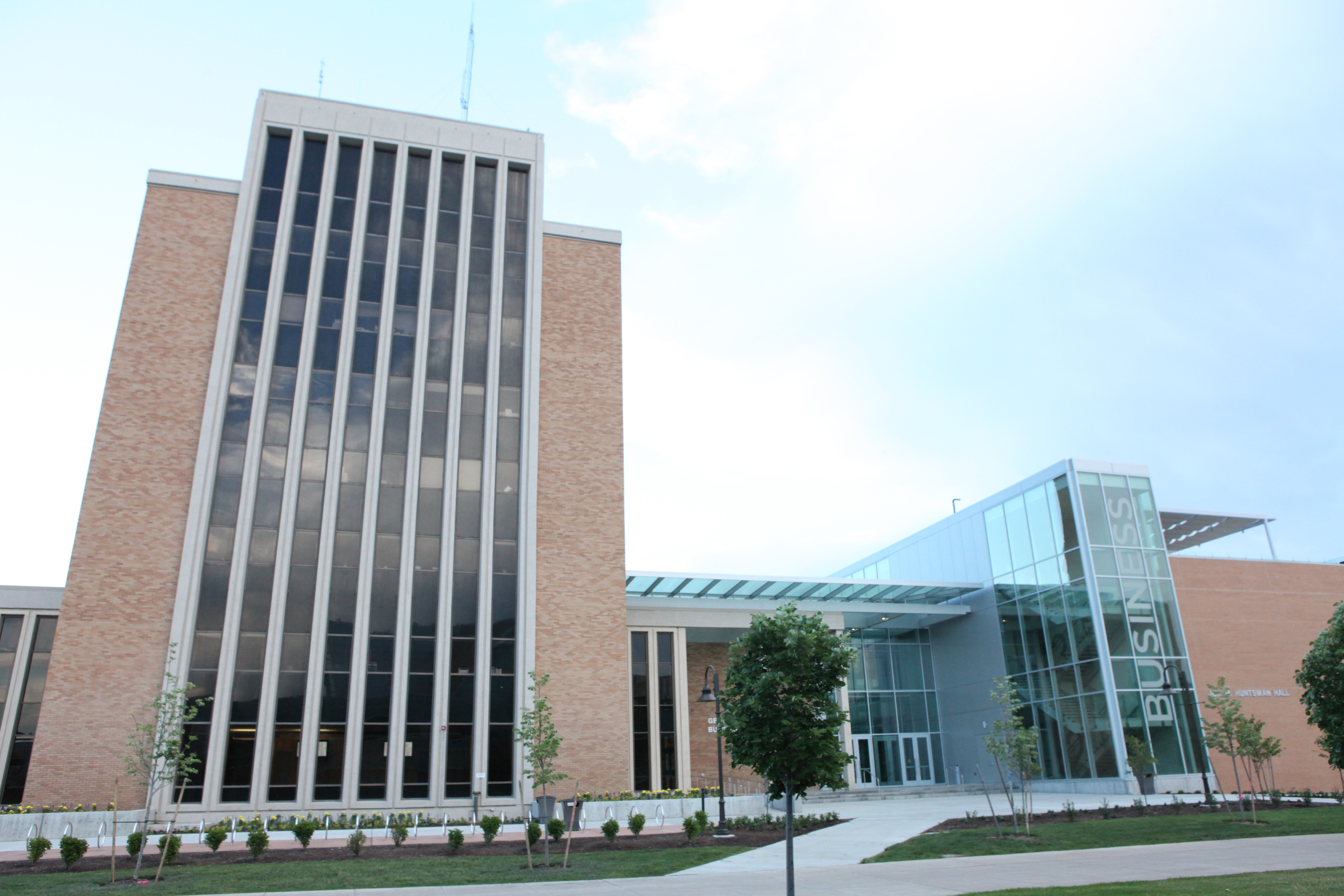
The Jon M. Huntsman School of Business north-facing entrances

Founded in 1889 (renamed in 2007 after a $26M gift from Jon Huntsman Sr.), the Huntsman School was Utah's first business college. It offers undergraduate and graduate degrees in management, accounting, economics, finance, and management information systems (MIS), among others, and houses the Shingo Institute (home of the Shingo Prize for Operational Excellence).

==== S.J. & Jessie E. Quinney College of Agriculture & Natural Resources ====
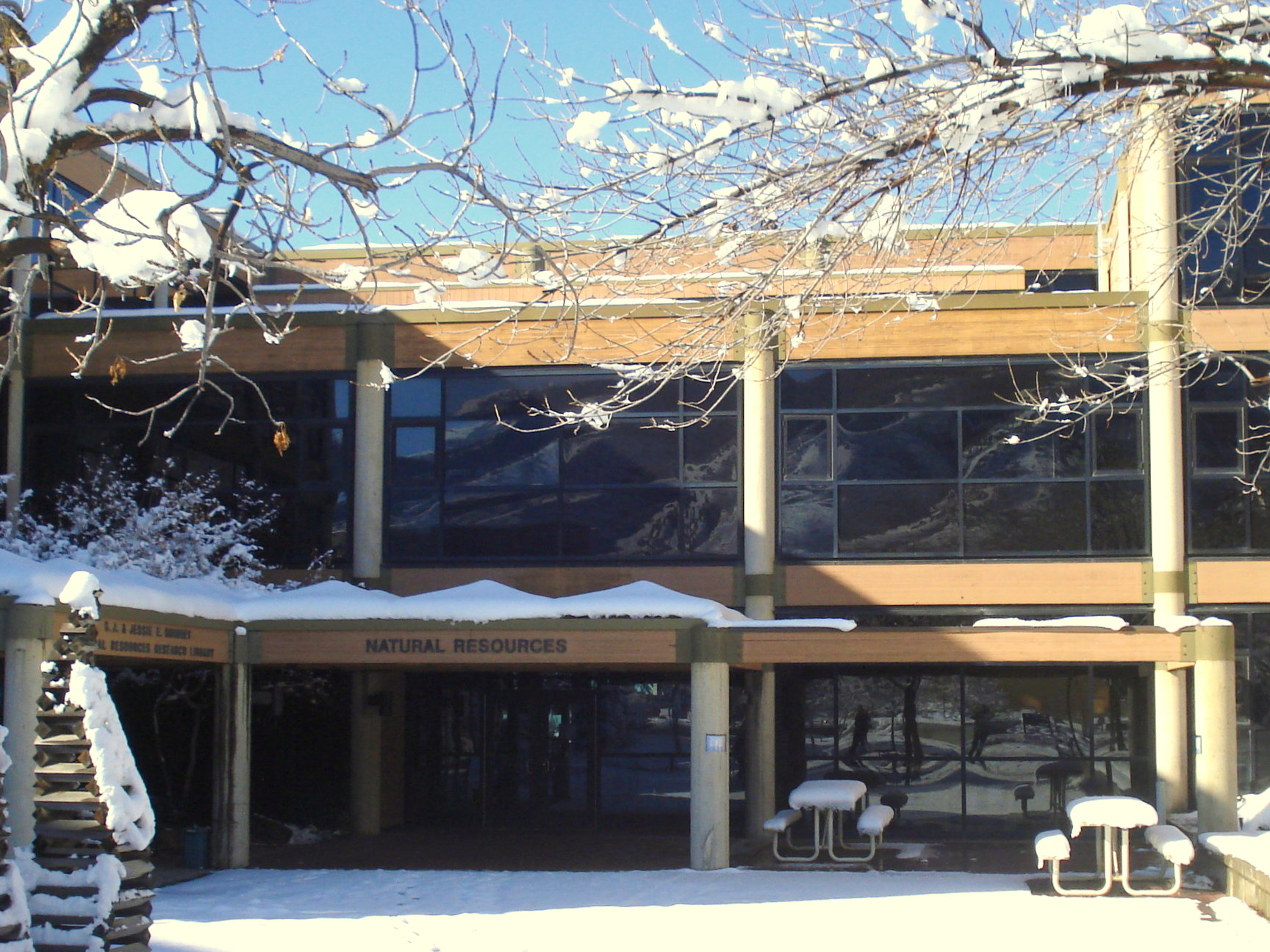
The Natural Resources Building

Created by merging the former College of Agriculture & Applied Sciences (CAAS) with the Quinney College of Natural Resources (QCNR), the college advances land-grant missions in agricultural production, food systems, natural resources stewardship, ecology, and environmental science. The College also houses USU's Aviation and Flight Technology programs. It operates a fleet of aircraft at the nearby Logan-Cache Airport and is one of the few public colleges in the nation to own and operate its own jet simulators.

==== School of Graduate Studies ====
The School of Graduate Studies coordinates master's and doctoral programs across all colleges.

=== Admissions ===
Undergraduate admissions statistics
- 2025 entering class
- Admit rate: 92.1% (▲ +1.1)
- Yield rate: 23.5% (▼ −7.9)

Test scores middle 50%^{[i]}
- SAT Total: 1090–1310 (among 11% of FTFs)
- SAT EBRW: 540–670
- SAT Math: 530–650
- ACT Composite: 20–27 (among 72% of FTFs)

High school GPA^{[ii]}
- Top 10%: 22%
- Top 25%: 45%
- Top 50%: 74%
- Average: 3.6

In fall 2025, Utah State received 21,235 applications for first-time freshman enrollment; 19,562 (92.1%) were accepted, and 4,594 freshmen enrolled, yielding a yield rate of 23.5%. The freshman retention rate is 74.5%, with 52.5% graduating within six years (fall 2018 cohort). Submission of SAT or ACT scores is not required for admission to Utah State. First-year applicants are evaluated on high school GPA; ACT or SAT scores are recommended for academic scholarships.

=== Rankings and reputation ===
Academic rankings

National
- Forbes: 275
- U.S. News & World Report: 288 (tie)
- Washington Monthly: 102
- WSJ/College Pulse: 293

Global
- ARWU: 501–600
- QS: 1001–1200
- THE: Unranked
- U.S. News & World Report: 749 (tie)

In 2026, Washington Monthly, which ranks colleges on their contribution to the public good using access, affordability, outcomes, and public service promotion, placed Utah State 102nd among 1,504 four-year colleges nationally, 34th in the West, and highest among Utah's public universities. In 2021, the Council on Undergraduate Research recognized Utah State for excellence in undergraduate research programs. In 2026, U.S. News & World Report ranked USU 17th nationally for "Best Online Bachelor's Programs." Forbes ranked the university No. 275 in its Top Colleges 2027 list, No. 179 among research universities and No. 65 in the West.

=== Libraries ===
The Merrill–Cazier Library opened in September 2005. The building integrated the Cazier Science and Technology Library with a 189,000-square-foot (17,600 m^{2}) expansion, replacing the 74-year-old Merrill Library. Because the Utah Legislature approved the project as replacement space, the new library could not add square footage. The library is named for Milton R. Merrill, former Utah State University vice president, and Stanford Cazier, former Utah State University president. The original library was built in 1930 and was later enclosed by a larger building, constructed in phases beginning in 1961 and dedicated in 1967.

An automated storage and retrieval system (ASRS) is integral to the building and supports many years of collection development. The BARN (Borrower's Automated Retrieval Network) was named after Utah State University's status as an agricultural school. The BARN stores all of the Merrill–Cazier Library's bound journals, over 200,000 less frequently used books, and most of the microform. The S.J. and Jessie E. Quinney Natural Resources Research Library, a 7,000-square-foot branch funded by the Quinney Foundation, opened in 1992 to serve the natural resources programs, and USU Eastern maintains libraries on its Price and Blanding campuses.

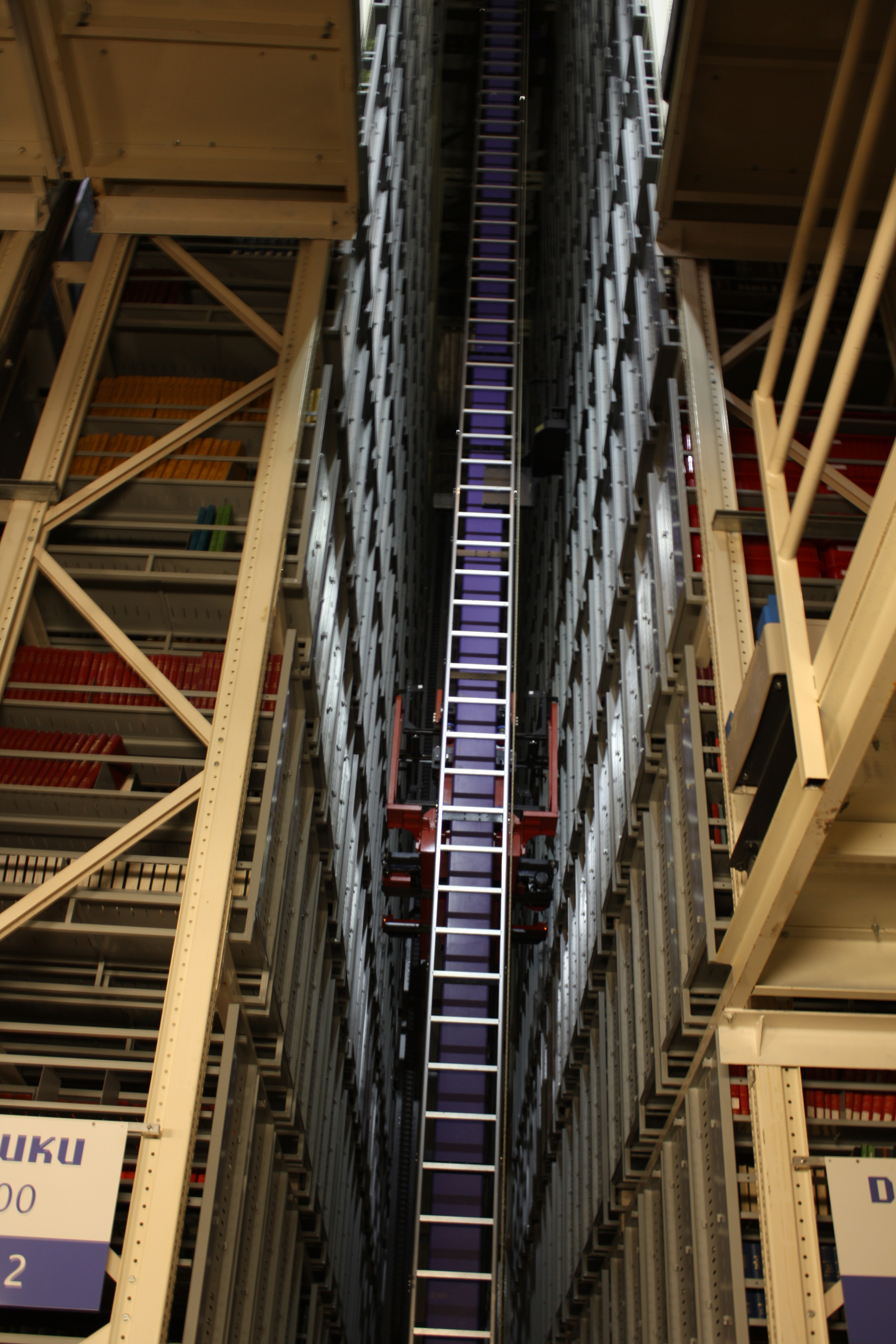
Merrill-Cazier Library's "Borrower's Automated Retrieval Network" (BARN) as viewed from the basement

=== Research ===
Utah State University is classified among "R1: Doctoral Universities – Very high research activity". In fiscal year 2024, the National Science Foundation ranked Utah State 80th nationally and 55th among public institutions in research and development expenditures ($451 million), and 10th nationally in engineering research and development expenditures ($356 million).

Utah State has more than 50 research institutes and centers. Notable research centers based at USU include the Space Dynamics Laboratory, Bingham Energy Research Center, Center for Integrated BioSystems, Center for Growth and Opportunity, Center for Anticipatory Intelligence, Energy Dynamics Laboratory, The Stephen R. Covey Leadership Center, Utah Water Research Laboratory, Center for High Performance Computing, Ecology Center, Utah Climate Center, Center for Advanced Nutrition, Thanksgiving Point, Center for the School of the Future, National Aquatic Monitoring Center, Ogden Botanical Center, Swaner Preserve and EcoCenter, Intermountain Center for River Rehabilitation and Restoration, Bastian Agricultural Center (South Jordan), Mountain West Center for Regional Studies, National Center for Hearing Assessment and Management, The Shingo Institute, Janet Quinney Lawson Institute for Land, Water and Air, and Utah Botanical Center.

The Janet Quinney Lawson Institute for Land, Water, and Air, established in 2021 with a $7 million gift, publishes an annual report on the state's natural resources for the governor and legislature. It is also part of the Great Salt Lake Strike Team, which brings together researchers from USU and the University of Utah with state agency staff.

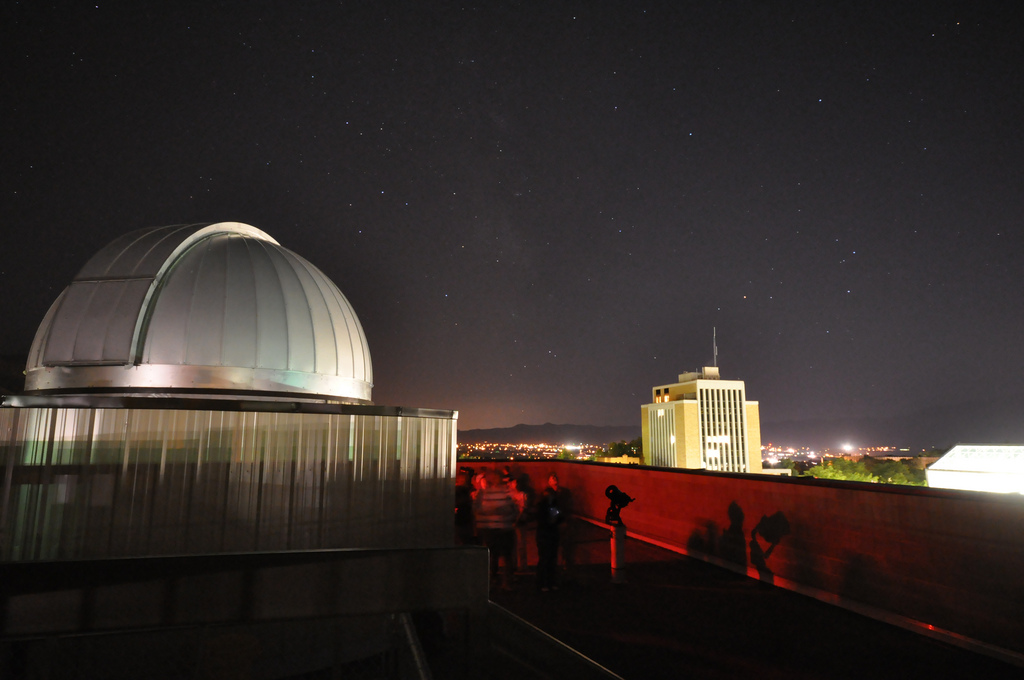
Observatory built in 2009 on top of the SER building. For the Department of Physics and public use, it houses a 20-inch (510 mm) reflecting telescope.

As of 2011, Utah State had sent more student experiments into space than any other university. In 2024, Utah State became a member of the U.S. Space Command Academic Engagement Enterprise.

USU's undergraduate research program was founded in 1975, making it the second program of its kind in the nation (after MIT). In 2021, the Council on Undergraduate Research presented Utah State and Georgia College & State University with its 2020 Award for Undergraduate Research Accomplishments, which recognizes institutions with exemplary undergraduate research programs. In the 2000s, Utah State University promoted the OpenCourseWare (OCW) Project (open and free university courses) and developed an open content management system for OCW called eduCommons. Its development was funded in part by a $915,000 grant from the William and Flora Hewlett Foundation in 2003. Several universities have adopted eduCommons to create OCW sites.

==== Space Dynamics Laboratory ====
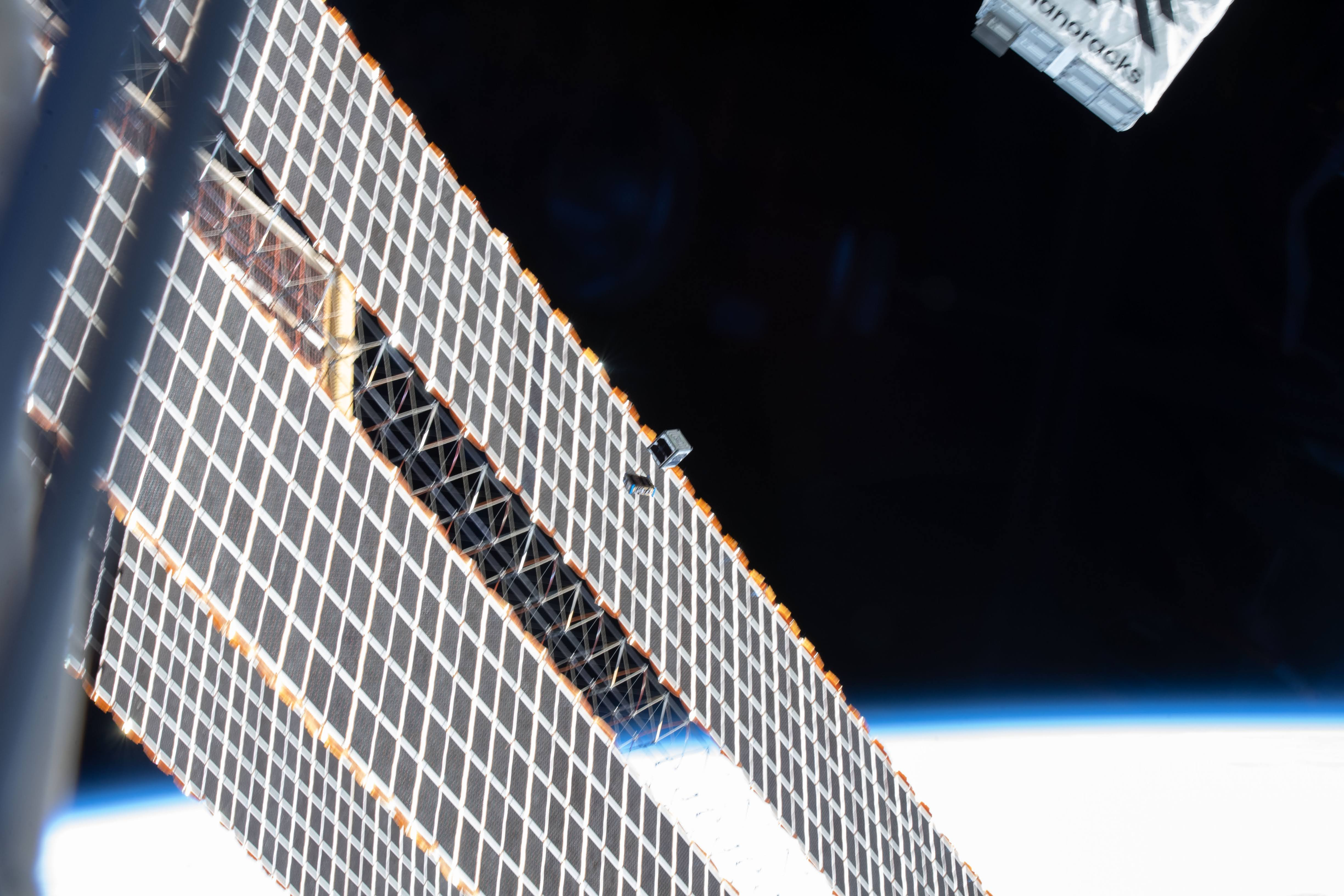
GASPACS moments after deployment from the International Space Station. GASPACS was developed entirely by USU undergraduate student researchers in programs funded through USU and in collaboration with NASA.

Space Dynamics Laboratory (SDL), a nonprofit owned by Utah State, is one of 15 University Affiliated Research Centers (UARCs) of the United States Department of Defense. Long sponsored by the Missile Defense Agency, SDL has been sponsored since 2025 by the Air Force's Office of the Assistant Secretary for Space Acquisition and Integration, formalizing its partnership with the Space Force. As of 2026, SDL employed about 1,400 engineers, scientists, and business professionals, including about 155 students.

SDL's projects have included WISE, SABER on the TIMED satellite, SOFIE on the AIM satellite, ICON and OSIRIS-REx. In 2021, Utah State received a $1 billion contract for aerospace research, including "space and nuclear advanced prototypes, experiments and technology," from the Air Force Research Laboratory, AFRL's largest-ever contract for space-related technology development.

GASPACS (Get Away Special Passive Attitude Control Satellite) was a NASA-sponsored 1U CubeSat developed entirely by undergraduate members of Utah State University's Get Away Special (GAS) team. The primary mission objective of GASPACS was to deploy a 1-meter inflatable aerodynamic boom to passively stabilize its attitude. GASPACS was the world's first CubeSat to be developed entirely by undergraduate students, and was also the world's first CubeSat to utilize a Raspberry Pi Zero as its flight computer.

==== Utah Water Research Laboratory ====
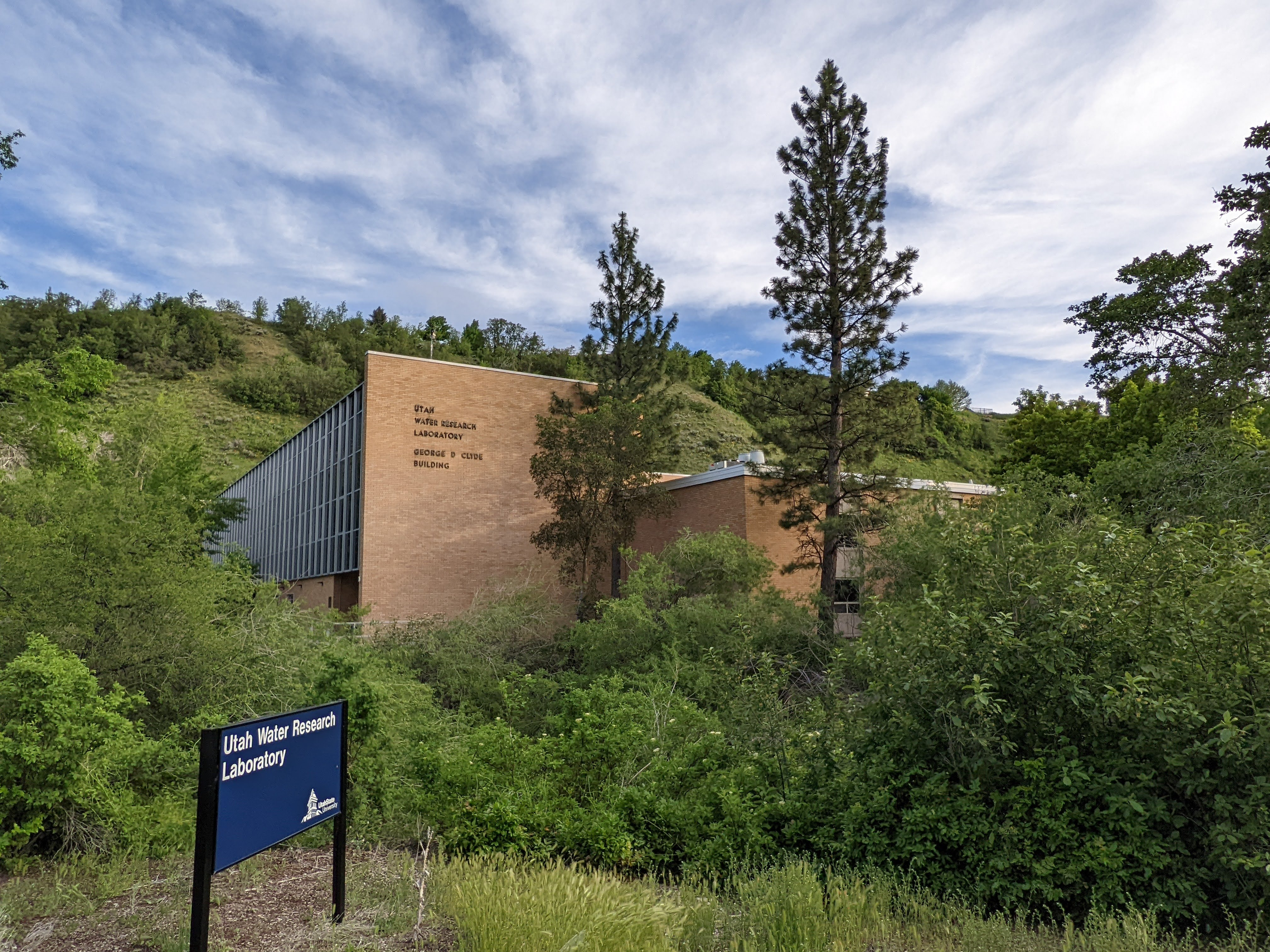
The Utah Water Research Laboratory

The Utah Water Research Laboratory (UWRL) is a research institution at Utah State. It is one of the oldest and largest water research facilities in the United States. In fiscal year 2025, research funding through the UWRL totaled more than $13.3 million.

==== USTAR ====
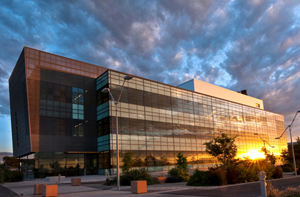
USU's USTAR BioInnovations Center

Utah State and the University of Utah were the two university partners in the Utah Science Technology and Research (USTAR) initiative, a state program established in 2006 aimed at building Utah's high-tech economy. Through USTAR, the state recruited 40 faculty members to the two universities. It invested in research buildings and laboratories on both campuses. USU's USTAR teams researched areas including cardiac arrhythmia, applied nutrition, adaptive lighting, synthetic bio-manufacturing, weather prediction, space weather, veterinary diagnostics, and wireless power transfer. In 2018, the Utah State Legislature removed the university research program from USTAR's statute and transferred responsibility for the researchers and campus research buildings to the universities. In 2019, the Legislature passed S.B. 212, which Governor Gary Herbert signed on March 26, 2019, dissolving USTAR's governing board and ending its grant program.

==== Agriculture and veterinary sciences ====
Utah State owns and operates 14 research farms, along with several equestrian, agricultural, ecological, and botanical centers statewide.

A team of USU and University of Idaho researchers were the first in the world to clone an equine successfully. The baby mule, named Idaho Gem, was born May 4, 2003.

USU researchers made headlines in 2011 after breeding transgenic goats. Utah State University professor Randy Lewis' "spider goats," the milk of which contains spider silk, are being studied for uses including human muscle tissue and lightweight bulletproof vests.

== Student life ==
Undergraduate demographics as of Fall 2023
Race and ethnicity	Total
White	82%
Hispanic	7%
Unknown	5%
Two or more races	3%
American Indian/Alaska Native	1%
Asian	1%
Black	1%
International student	1%
Economic diversity
Low-income (Note: The percentage of students who received an income-based federal Pell grant intended for low-income students.)	32%
Affluent (Note: The percentage of students who are a part of the American middle class at the bare minimum.)	68%

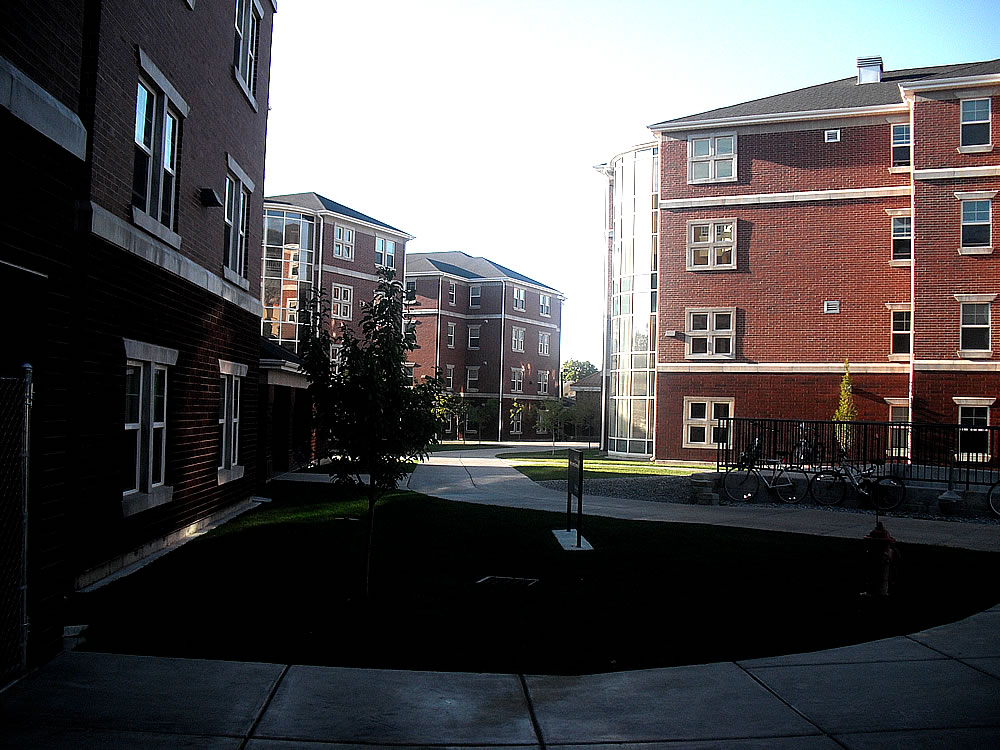
The Living Learning Community on-campus housing complex

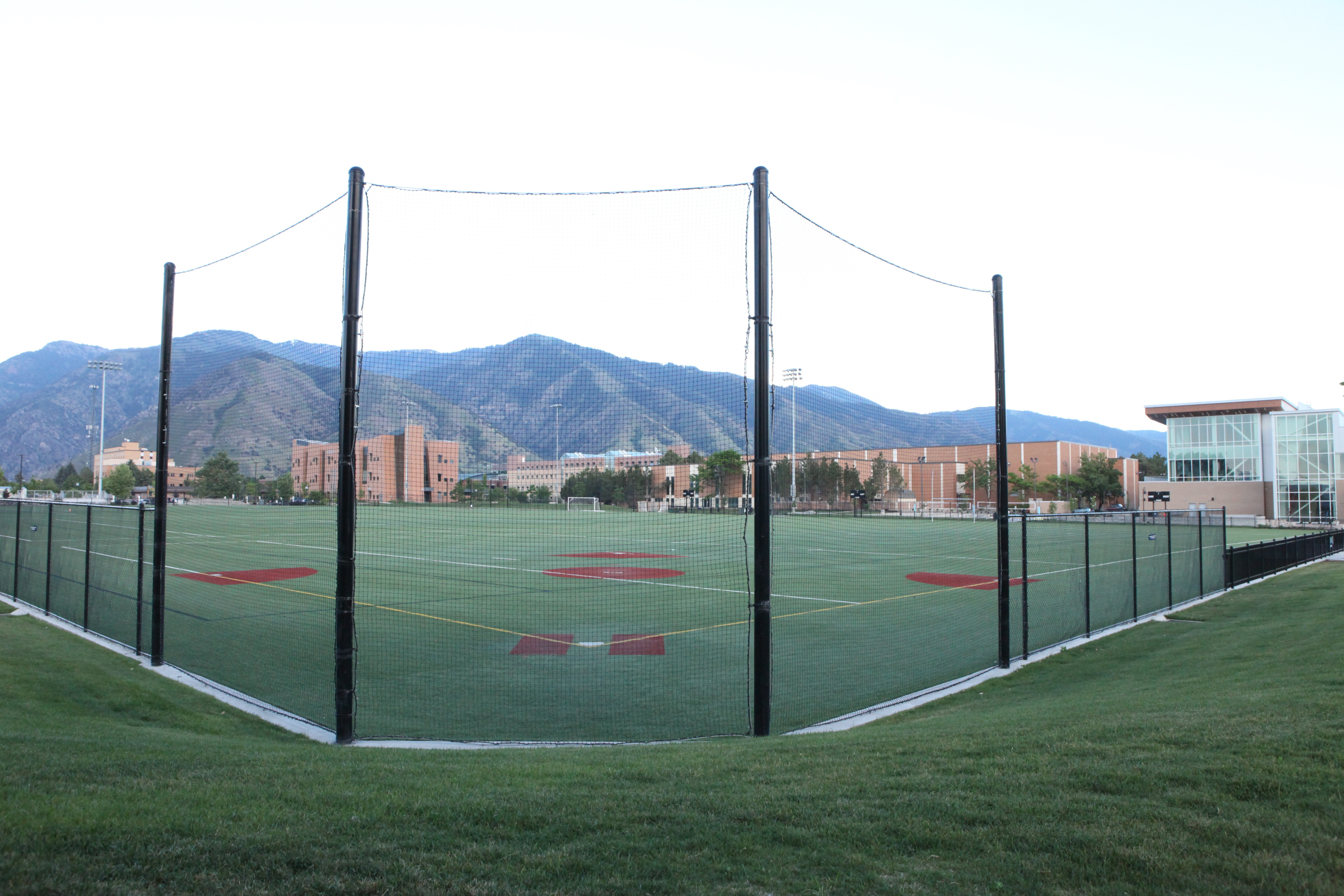
Students have access to Aggie Legacy Fields, which are equipped with durable astroturf and lighting for after-dark activities.

=== Housing and dining ===
A student employee serves Aggie Ice Cream

Utah State University describes its Logan Campus as Utah's largest public residential campus and reports that about 84 percent of its students live away from home. As of 2023, about a quarter of USU's roughly 20,000 students lived on campus.

Students on campus can eat at two dining halls, The Marketplace and The Junction, as well as the Forum Café in the Merrill-Cazier Library, the full-service Skyroom restaurant, and The Hub food court. On the east edge of campus, Aggie Ice Cream sells ice cream, cheese, sandwiches, and soups made by the university's creamery, which dates back to its founding in 1888.

Since its founding in 1888, USU has had a creamery, with its first location in Old Main. Students studying dairying and domestic arts applied to learn how to make both ice cream and cheeses. In 1921, Gustav Wilster began working with the College of Agriculture. By 1922, students studied dairy technology, fluid milk processing, ice cream manufacture, dairy engineering, cheese manufacture, butter making, dairy facility inspection, and dairy product judging. Students influenced by the program went on to open ice cream businesses including Casper's Ice Cream, Farr's Ice Cream, and Snelgrove's Ice Cream. In 1975, the Nutrition and Food Sciences building was built, where Aggie Ice Cream is housed; a second location opened in USU's Blue Square student housing in 2023.

Along with Aggie Ice Cream, USU owns and operates its chocolate factory, The Aggie Chocolate Factory, through its agriculture college (now the S.J. & Jessie E. Quinney College of Agriculture & Natural Resources). The Aggie Chocolate Factory has shops on both the academic and residential campuses in Logan and the athletic stadiums. In winter, the Aggie Chocolate Factory also sells its own hot cocoa; on hot days, it sells "Frozen As"— an iced cocoa drink.

=== Organizations and student government ===
USU students are also involved in more than 200 clubs, the student government, and four fraternities and three sororities. Since 2020, fraternities and sororities that sign a relationship agreement with the university have operated as recognized student organizations. The agreements, adopted after USU settled a lawsuit by a former student who was raped at a Logan fraternity house in 2015, give the university greater oversight of the chapters and require them to report allegations of misconduct.

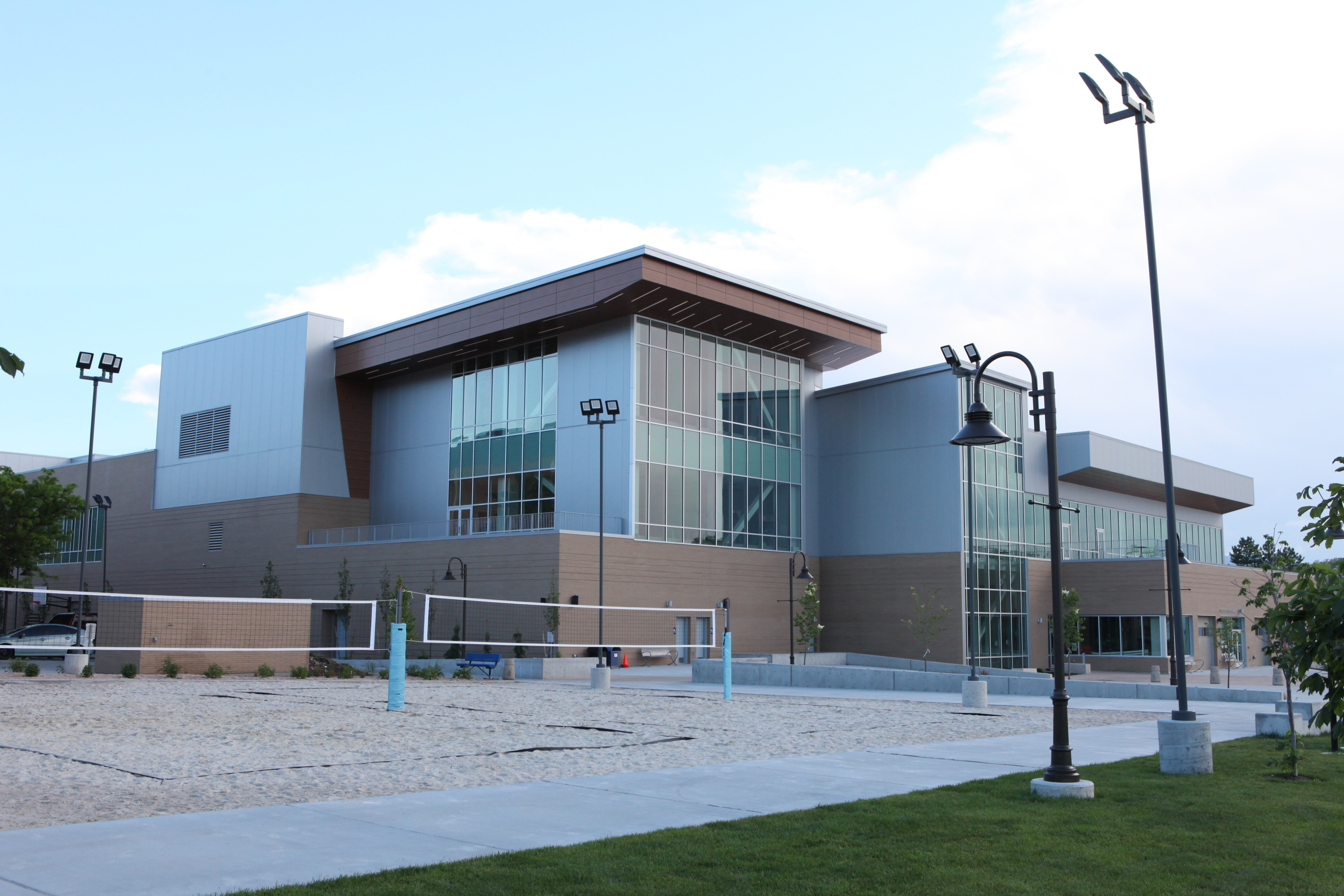
Utah State University's Aggie Recreation Center was completed in 2015

The Utah State University Student Association (USUSA) represents the university's student body. USUSA is composed of 17 elected student officers and five appointed student officers.

These officers typically oversee a specific area of responsibility outlined in each officer's charter. USUSA officers' duties can range from managing campus events and activities to promoting and advocating for particular initiatives at the Utah State Legislature. Officers are elected each spring.

The USUSA received significant attention during the 2016–2017 school year when the organization declared a mental health crisis at Utah State University. The legislation (written by USUSA Student Body President Ashley Waddoups, USUSA Student Advocate Vice President Matthew Clewett, and USUSA Graduate Studies Senator Ty Aller) sought to raise awareness of significant wait times for students to utilize CAPS (Counseling and Psychological Services) at Utah State as well as the increasing number of students who were suffering from mental health-related illnesses. After a successful lobbying campaign, the USUSA was able to influence the Utah State Legislature to pass a resolution declaring a mental health crisis at all Utah System of Higher Education (USHE) institutions. The resolution was subsequently signed by Utah Governor Gary Herbert in March 2017.

In 1970, Utah State student Sue Brown and Director of Student Activities Val R. Christensen created one of the nation's first service organizations. VOICE, Volunteer Organization for Involvement in the Community and Environment, worked to improve the environment and social issues in Cache Valley. VOICE became The Val R. Christensen Service Center in 1999 in honor of Dr. Christensen's efforts and support of the organization. As of 2020, students were involved in more than 20 service organizations.

=== Traditions ===
Well-known student traditions include the rite of passage of becoming a True Aggie, which requires a student to kiss someone who is already a True Aggie on top of the Block "A." Two students may also become True Aggies together on Homecoming night or A-Day. In 2011, USU broke the record in the Guinness Book of World Records for the most couples kissing at the same place at the same time. Nearby the Block "A" is the lighted "A" atop the Old Main tower, which shines white throughout the entire valley and blue on nights when a varsity sport has picked up a victory, or other special events have occurred on campus.

Utah State has a history of various traditions, including its two fight songs ("Hail the Utah Aggies" and "The Scotsman") and a range of chants, such as "I Believe." The Scotsman is particularly notable for the unified standing and hand motions performed by students and fans. Other traditions and events for students are sponsored by USU, the HURD, and the Student Association and held throughout the year and include Homecoming and "The Howl," a Halloween celebration. Other annual student events include the Luminary Processional, which welcomes new students each fall, and The End of Year Bash, a concert on campus that culminates at the end of the academic year each April. The college's first motto, "Labor is Life," appeared on its seal from the 1890s until 1957. In 1958 the university adopted the motto "The State Is Our Campus" to reflect its statewide extension mission, and its current seal surrounds the Old Main tower with the words research, teaching, and service.

Given USU's history and traditions as a land-grant school with an original charter for, in part, military sciences, Utah State hosts an Air Force ROTC unit, and its students can also join Army ROTC. ROTC members wear uniforms or field attire as the color guard at home athletic events. ROTC members also attend every home football game on the field and in the stadium. Wearing field attire, ROTC members perform push-ups and fire a 75mm howitzer cannon at the initial kickoff and after each Aggie score. Utah State ROTC cadet activity and presence both on and off the field is especially present at events surrounding Veteran's Day and during athletic events when the Aggies play the U.S. Air Force Academy Falcons. During certain home and away games, USU's mascot, Big Blue, will also don military field attire. Utah State's ROTC cadets also participate in other opportunities and events both on and off campus, including at the annual USU homecoming parade in Logan.

USU's Big Blue mascot appears at home and away games, as well as in the greater Logan and Utah communities. Big Blue is a member of the Spirit Squad and performs dance routines and acrobatic stunts. Historically, the mascot was a live white bull painted blue for games; in 1976, the bull was named GUS, an acronym for "Go Utah State." By historical accounts, an attempt to protect the new basketball court by fitting the bull with rubber boots was a disaster. The live bull was later retired, and a costumed Big Blue first appeared in 1987. Former Big Blue Kenn Solomon went on to become Rocky, the Denver Nuggets' original mascot, in 1990. For years, the student Big Blue led the football team onto the field riding a blue motorcycle; beginning with the 2025 season, riders from the USU rodeo team on horseback have led the team's entrance. Around Veterans Day and when USU competes against the Air Force Academy, Big Blue will also wear military field attire. Tryouts are held for the role; once selected, the student's identity is kept confidential until a formal "de-masking."

In October 2026, Utah State unveiled a new live mascot named Thistle, a shaggy-coated Highland steer. Two steer siblings born in April 2026, Thistle 1 and Thistle 2, will begin attending university events beginning in fall 2027.

=== Media ===
Journals based at or historically hosted by the university include Utah Science; Western Historical Quarterly, the journal of the Western History Association, which was edited at Utah State from its founding in 1969 until 2016; and Western American Literature, which moved to the University of Nebraska Press after Utah State ended its funding in 2013. The Utah State University Press publishes works in composition studies, folklore, Mormon history, Native American studies, nature and environment, and western history.

The Utah Statesman (The Statesman) is the primary news outlet serving the student body. It is student-run with a faculty adviser and is funded by a student media fee, which it shares with Aggie Radio, and advertising revenue. The Statesman prints 3,000 copies weekly during the academic year and monthly in the summer, distributed at about 20 locations on and off campus. It won the Society for Professional Journalists' Best Column Writing (2002) and Best Non-Daily Student Paper (2005) awards. The paper was known as Student Life before 1979.

Aggie Radio 92.3 KBLU-LP is an entirely student-run radio station broadcasting to Cache Valley and online. Programming emphasizes local, alternative, and independent music, with live sports via its Learfield affiliation covering Utah State football and men's and women's basketball throughout the season.

Utah Public Radio (UPR), a service of Utah State University, broadcasts news, information, public affairs, and cultural programming 24/7 across Utah and southern Idaho via six stations and 30 translators. UPR began in 1953 as KVSC, became KUSU-FM in 1961, and is affiliated with National Public Radio and American Public Media.

Aggie TV, the university's private cable television system, is free for residents of the Blue Square Apartments and Snow Hall.

== Athletics ==
One of two official logos for the Utah State Aggies—the "UState" logo, widely used on uniforms and facilities.

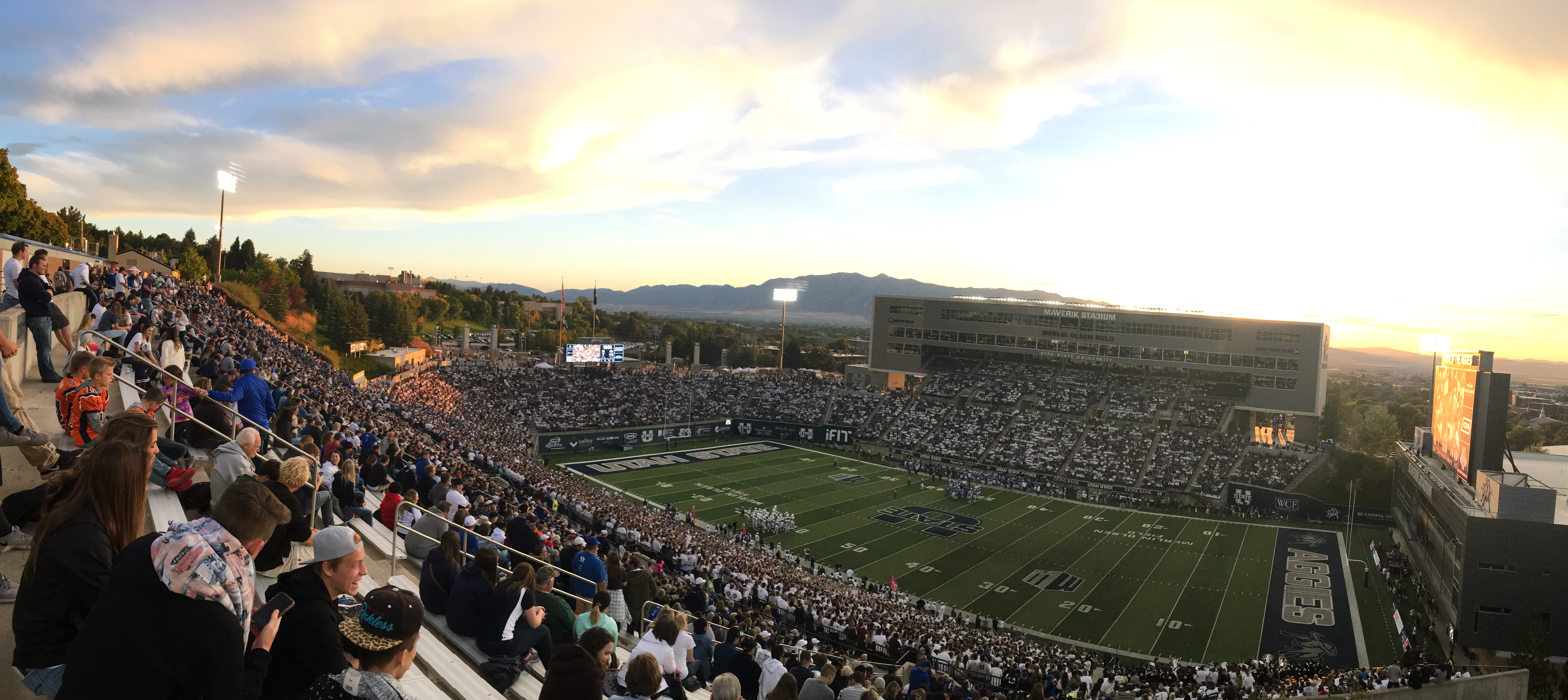
Maverik Stadium during an Aggie football game

Utah State University supports organized athletics within the varsity intercollegiate, club intercollegiate, and intramural categories. Since its founding in 1888, USU programs and athletes have won six individual national championships.

=== Varsity athletics ===
USU competes in NCAA Division I as a member of the Pac-12 Conference, which it joined in 2026 after competing in the Mountain West Conference (MWC) from 2013 through the spring of 2026. Aggie teams have won 37 conference championships and three national collegiate titles (women's volleyball; softball twice). Golfer Jay Don Blake won the 1980 NCAA individual championship and was NCAA Player of the Year in 1981. Three Aggie football players have been consensus All-Americans: Merlin Olsen (1961), Phil Olsen (1969) and Savon Scarver (2018).

Varsity sports

- Men: football; basketball; cross country; golf; tennis; track & field (indoor and outdoor).
- Women: basketball; cross country; gymnastics; soccer; softball; tennis; track & field (indoor and outdoor); volleyball.

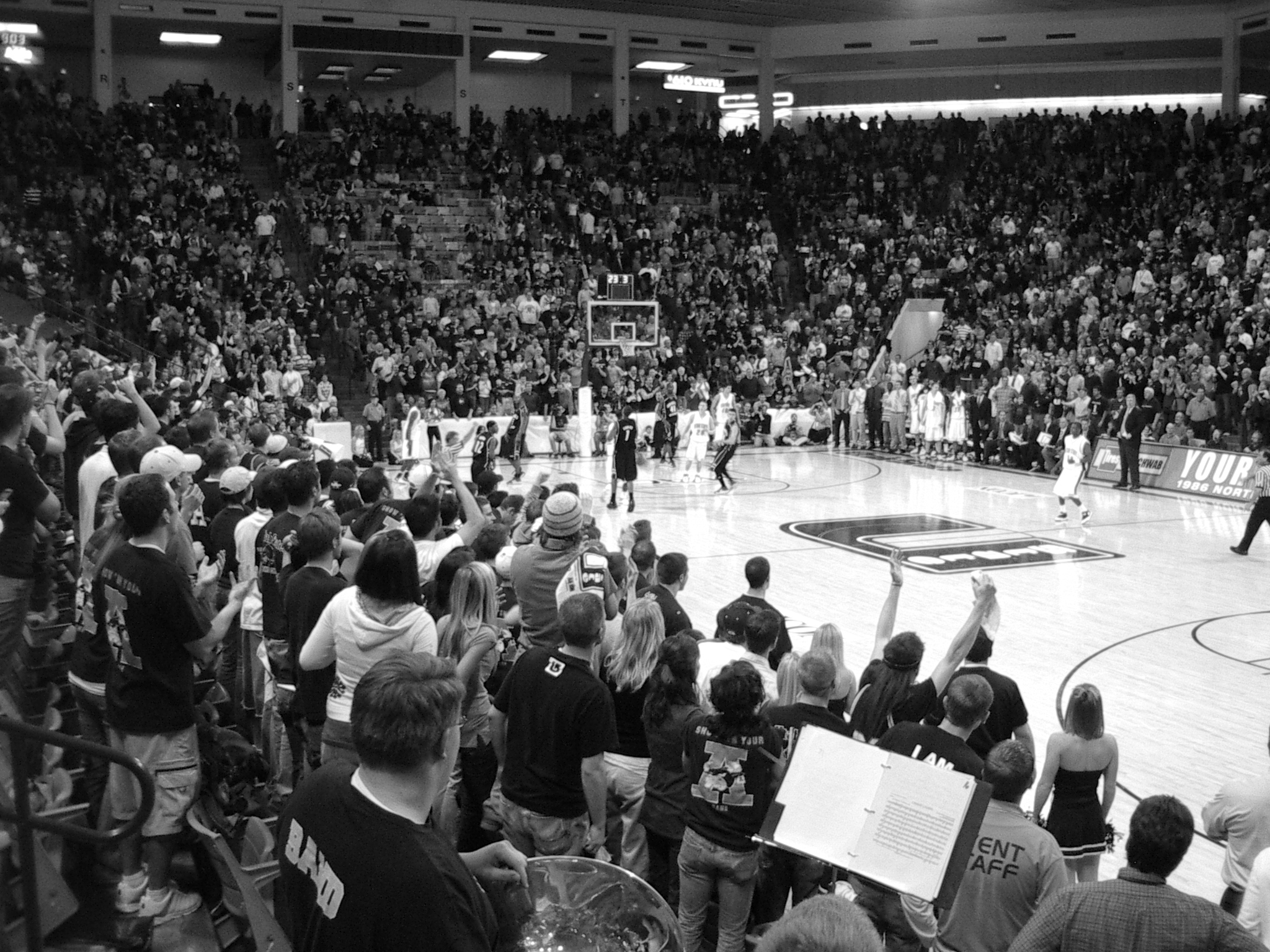
Aggie fans at the Dee Glen Smith Spectrum

The men's basketball team plays in the Dee Glen Smith Spectrum, long regarded as one of college basketball's toughest venues. USU's student section, The HURD, has also drawn national attention. During 2008–09, USU rose to #17 in the ESPN/USA Today Coaches' Poll. Under Stew Morrill, USU went 193–13 (.937) at home, made eight NCAA tournaments from 2000 to 2011, and amassed one of the nation's top win totals in that span. USU captured Mountain West regular-season titles in 2018–19, 2023–24, and 2025–26 and tournament titles in 2019, 2020, and 2026, and has appeared in five of the last six NCAA tournaments (2021, 2023, 2024, 2025, 2026).

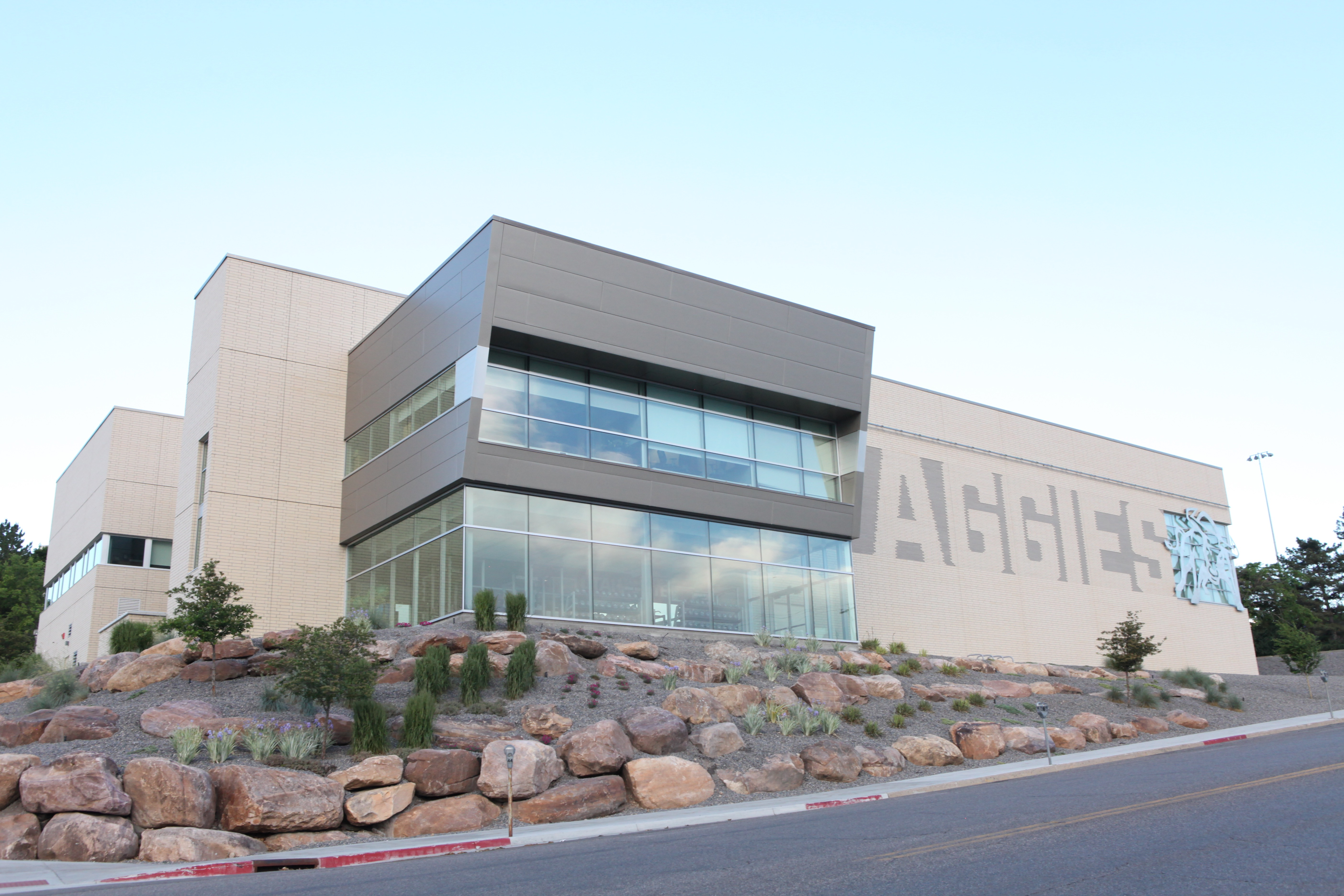
Utah State women's volleyball at the Wayne Estes Center

USU football competes in the FBS. Under head coach Gary Andersen, USU posted its first 10-win regular season in 2012, won its first Western Athletic Conference football title, and finished ranked in all three major polls. Athletics director Scott Barnes emphasized recruiting, TV coverage, fundraising, facilities, and reorganization during a resource-constrained period—efforts recognized by the 2009 Excellence in Management Cup. Matt Wells succeeded Andersen before the 2013–14 season, and in December 2020, athletics director John Hartwell hired Blake Anderson as USU's 29th head coach. Anderson led USU for three seasons before interim head coach Nate Dreiling guided the program in 2024, and Bronco Mendenhall was named head coach for 2025.

USU was in the WAC from 2005 to 2012; men's teams won WAC titles in football (2012), basketball (2008–2011), indoor track (2008, 2010, 2011), outdoor track (2007, 2009–2011), and cross country (2005–2009, 2011). Women's teams won WAC titles in volleyball (2012), soccer (2008, 2010–2012), cross country (2006, 2008), and indoor/outdoor track (2012). National collegiate titles include women's volleyball (1978) and softball (1980, 1981). As MWC members, the Aggies claimed a football division crown and played in the inaugural MWC Championship Game (2013), and football won its first MWC title in 2021; men's tennis won the MWC regular season in 2016; regular season and tournament titles in 2017; the tournament in 2018; and another regular season crown in 2024; men's cross country won the league in 2019; volleyball won the regular season in 2021; and men's basketball won MWC tournament titles in 2019, 2020, and 2026.

=== Club and intramural sports ===
USU club teams have won fifteen national titles. Baseball club titles came in 2012 and 2014; rodeo has produced two individual national champions (Garrett Thurston, Trevor Merrill); the handball club has claimed nine national titles among its roster; and the Cycling Club has two individual national championships.

Utah State's Campus Recreation program sponsors more than 20 student-run club sports, among them men's ice hockey, baseball, rugby, lacrosse, rodeo, handball, ultimate, water polo, and esports. Aggie Recreation offers intramural sports to students, faculty, and staff using campus and community facilities.

== Notable alumni and faculty ==
USU is associated with seven Rhodes Scholars, one Nobel Prize winner, one MacArthur Fellow, four recipients of the Harry S. Truman Scholarship, 40 Barry M. Goldwater Scholarship recipients since 1998, several astronauts (including Mary L. Cleave), numerous political and judicial leaders (including Utah Governor Spencer Cox), diplomats, and international heads of government such as Hesham Qandil, former Prime Minister of Egypt.

Utah State alumni include accomplished artists, writers, athletes, and executives. They have led major corporations and nonprofit organizations worldwide, and several have held senior ecclesiastical positions in the Church of Jesus Christ of Latter-day Saints, including Ezra Taft Benson, who attended Utah State, was former U.S. Secretary of Agriculture, and later President of the Church. Alumni who later served in the church's Quorum of the Twelve Apostles include Boyd K. Packer, L. Tom Perry, Quentin L. Cook, and Gary E. Stevenson.

On June 13, 1899, graduates of the Agricultural College of Utah met to create the Alumni Association. The association is housed in the historic David B. Haight Alumni Center, dedicated July 11, 1991. Alumni chapters exist in Arizona, Colorado, Florida, Georgia, Idaho, Nevada, New Mexico, Texas, Utah, and Washington, D.C. USU has nearly 200,000 living alumni in all 50 states and 116 countries.

Particularly notable alumni include Harry Reid, former U.S. Senate Majority Leader; Lars Peter Hansen, 2013 Nobel Laureate in Economic Sciences; 1991 Wolf Prize winner in Agriculture, Shang Fa Yang; poet May Swenson; Merlin Olsen, Pro Football Hall of Famer and actor; Ardeshir Zahedi, former Iranian Foreign Minister and Ambassador to the United States; Olympic sprinter LaDonna Antoine-Watkins; Chris Cooley, NFL tight end; College Football Hall of Fame coach LaVell Edwards; NBA championship coach Dick Motta; Jean Westwood, who took classes at Utah State and became the first woman to chair the Democratic National Committee; Jordan Love, quarterback for the Green Bay Packers; Bobby Wagner, a member of the NFL 2010s All-Decade Team whose No. 9 jersey Utah State announced in April 2026 it would retire; Nolan Bushnell, founder of Atari, who attended before transferring to the University of Utah; Don Quayle, the first president of NPR; and Elizabeth Dowdeswell, former Lieutenant Governor of Ontario and head of the United Nations Environment Programme.

Nine USU faculty members have been named Utah Professor of the Year by the Carnegie Foundation for the Advancement of Teaching and the Council for Advancement and Support of Education: Jan Sojka (physics, 2002), Bonnie Glass-Coffin (anthropology, 2004), Lyle McNeal (animal, dairy and veterinary sciences, 2007), David Peak (physics, 2009), Laurie McNeill (civil and environmental engineering, 2010), Jim Cangelosi (mathematics and statistics, 2011), Michael Christiansen (music, 2012), Joyce Kinkead (English, 2013) and Rich Etchberger (wildland resources, 2015).

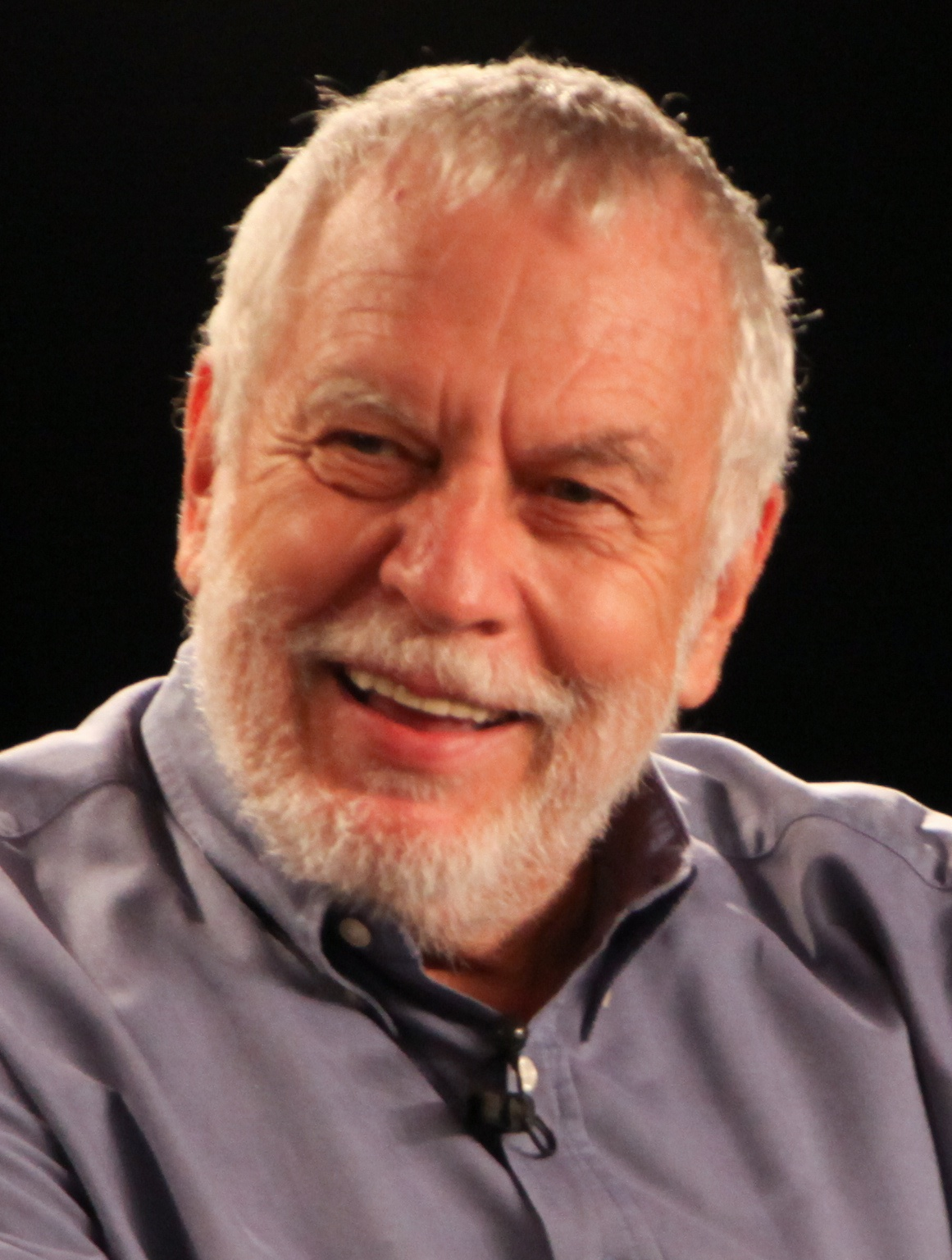
Nolan Bushnell, attended 1961–1963 — founder of Atari and Chuck E. Cheese

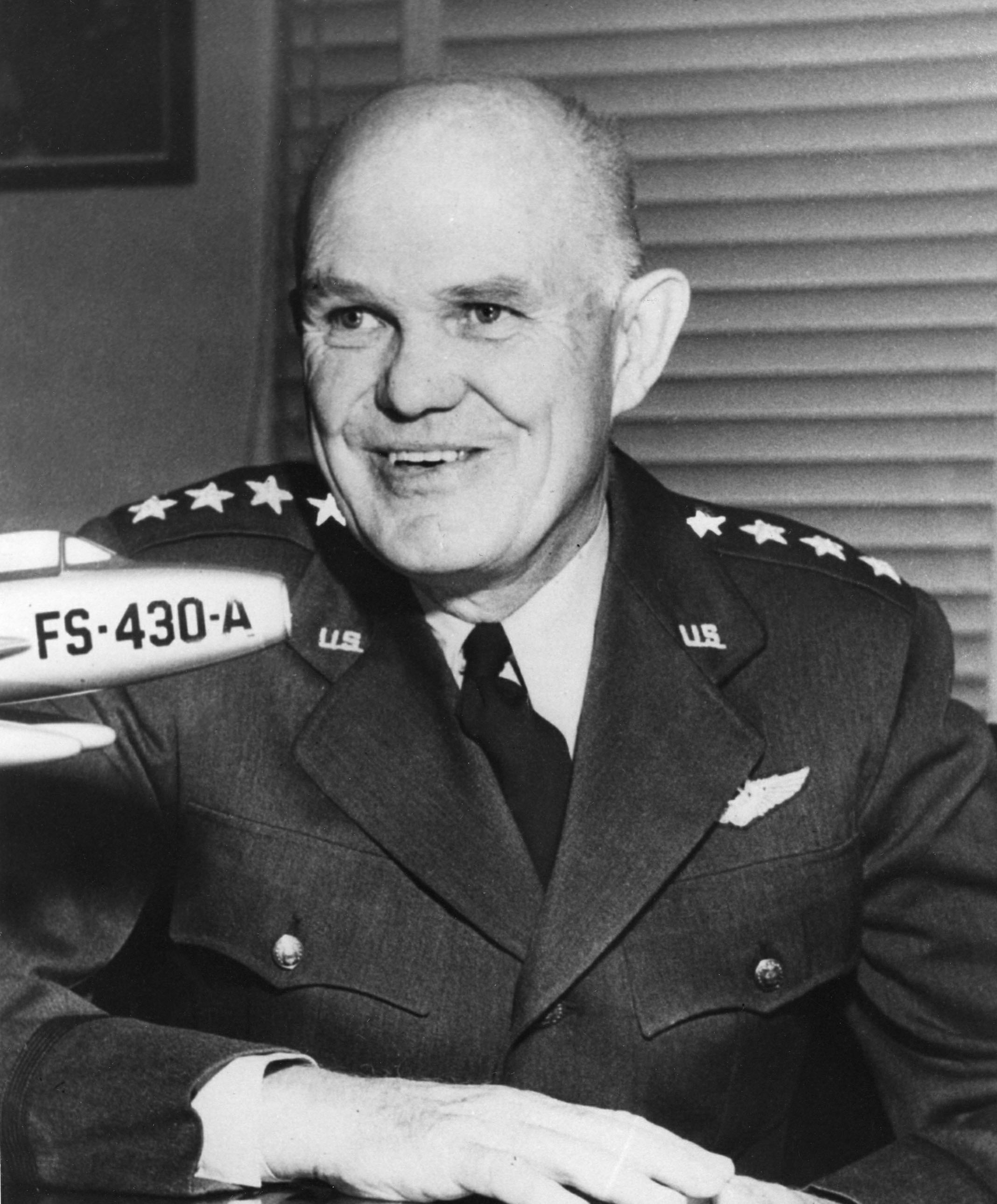
John K. Cannon, graduated 1914 — Commander, U.S. Air Forces in Europe (1945)

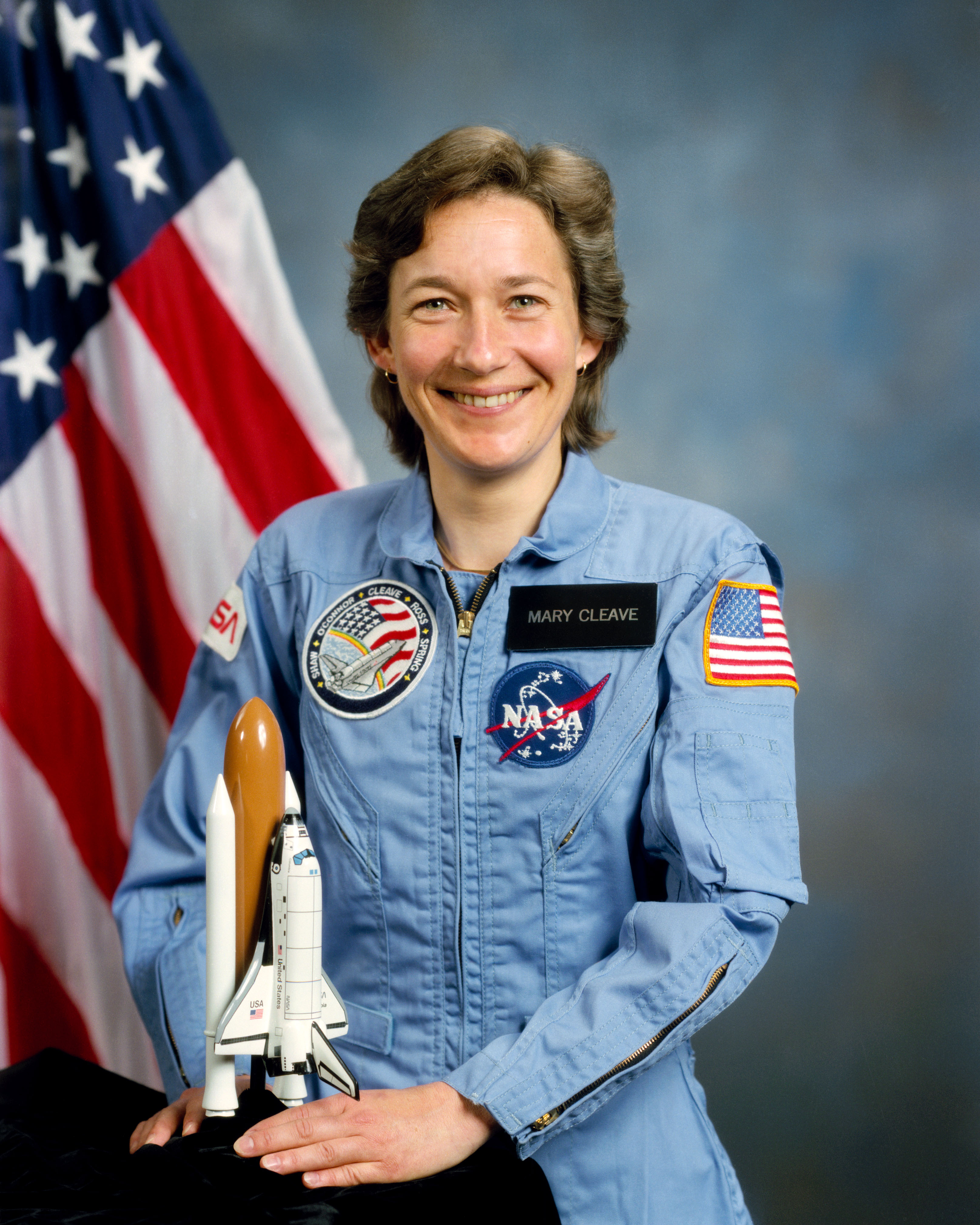
Mary L. Cleave, M.S. 1975; Ph.D. 1980 — NASA Space Shuttle astronaut

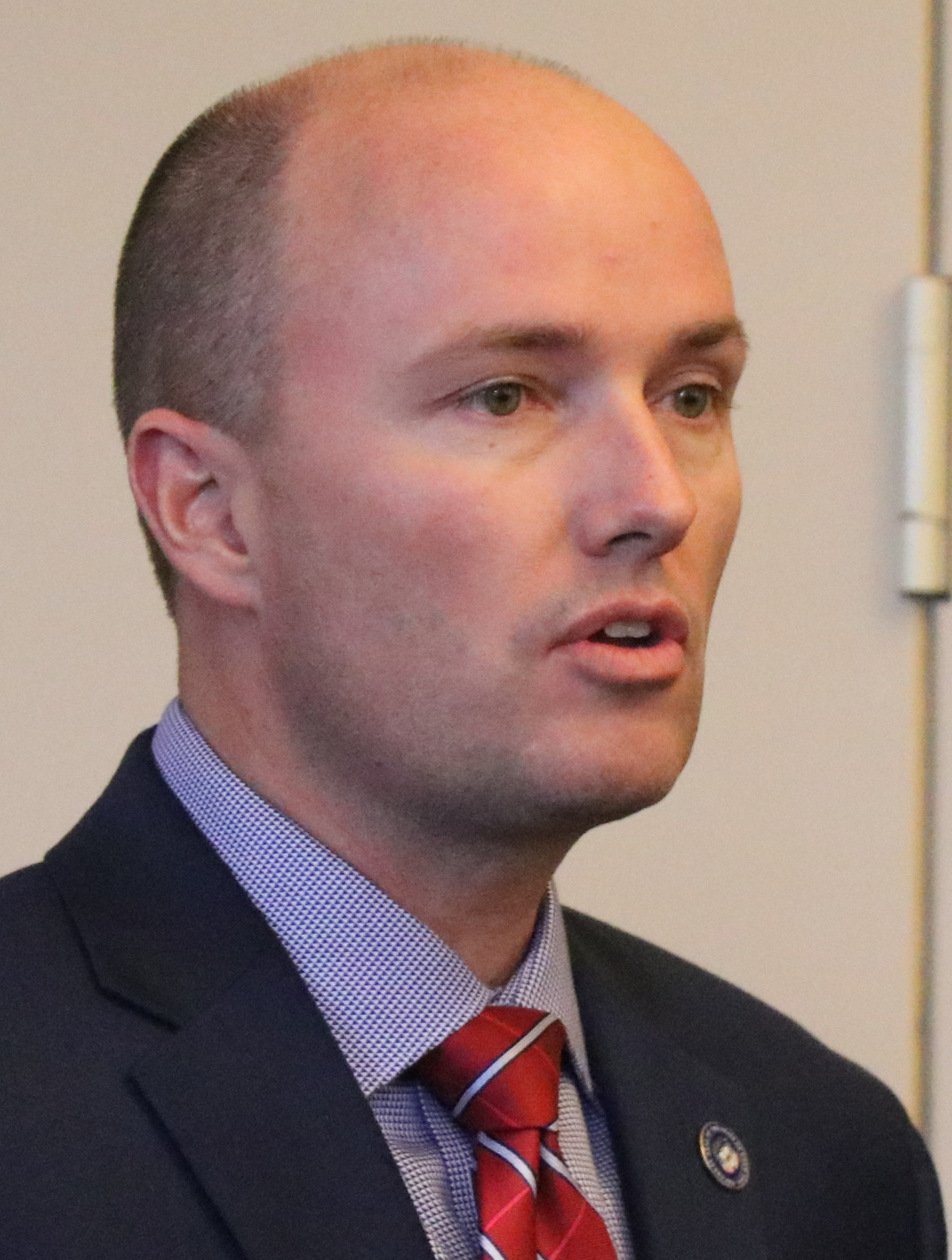
Spencer Cox, B.A. 1998 — Governor of Utah (2021–present)

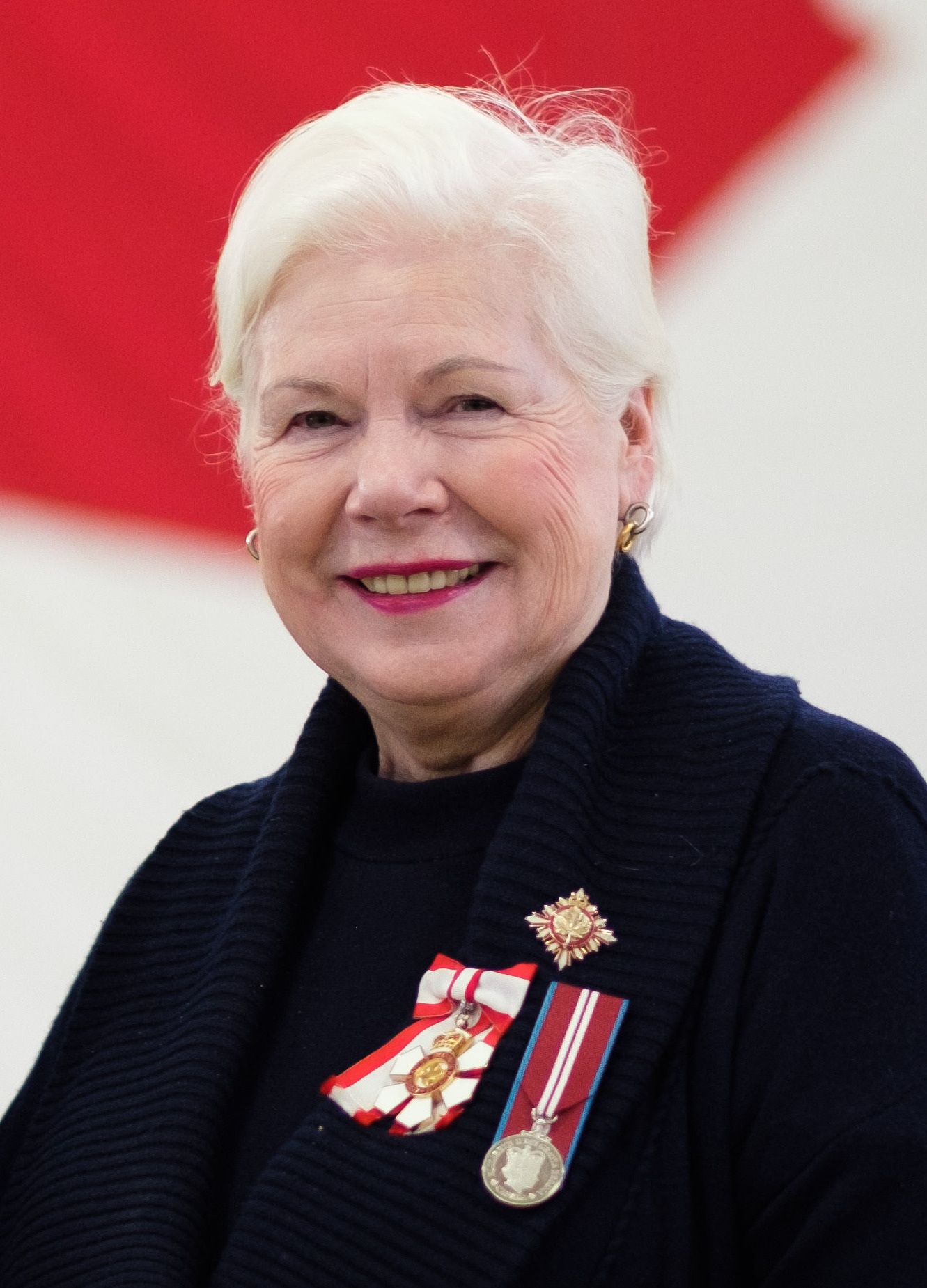
Elizabeth Dowdeswell, M.S. 1972 — Lieutenant Governor of Ontario (2014–2023); former executive director of the United Nations Environment Programme

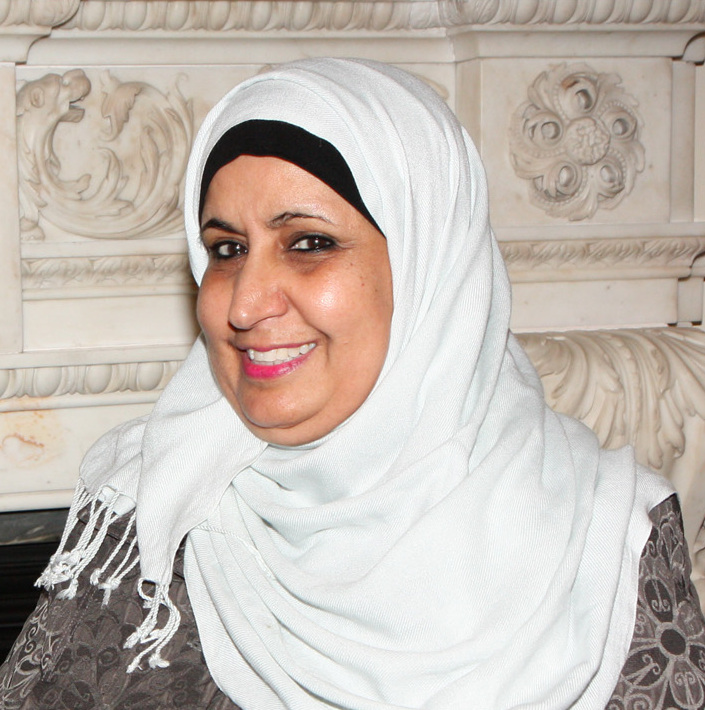
Norah Al Faiz, M.S. 1982 — Deputy Minister for Women's Education in Saudi Arabia (first woman appointed to a ministerial post in Saudi Arabia)

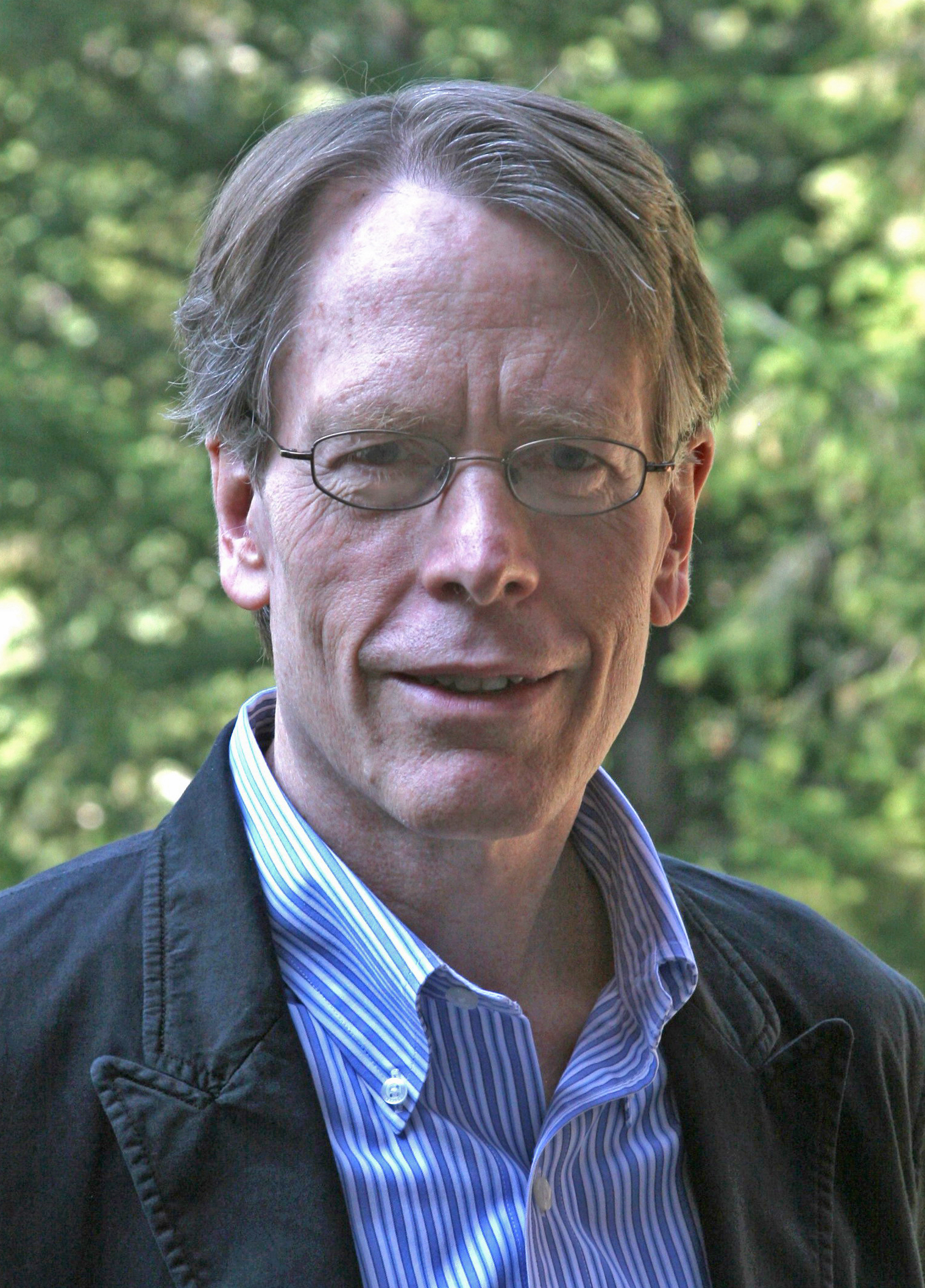
Lars Peter Hansen, B.S. 1974 — 2013 Nobel Laureate in Economic Sciences

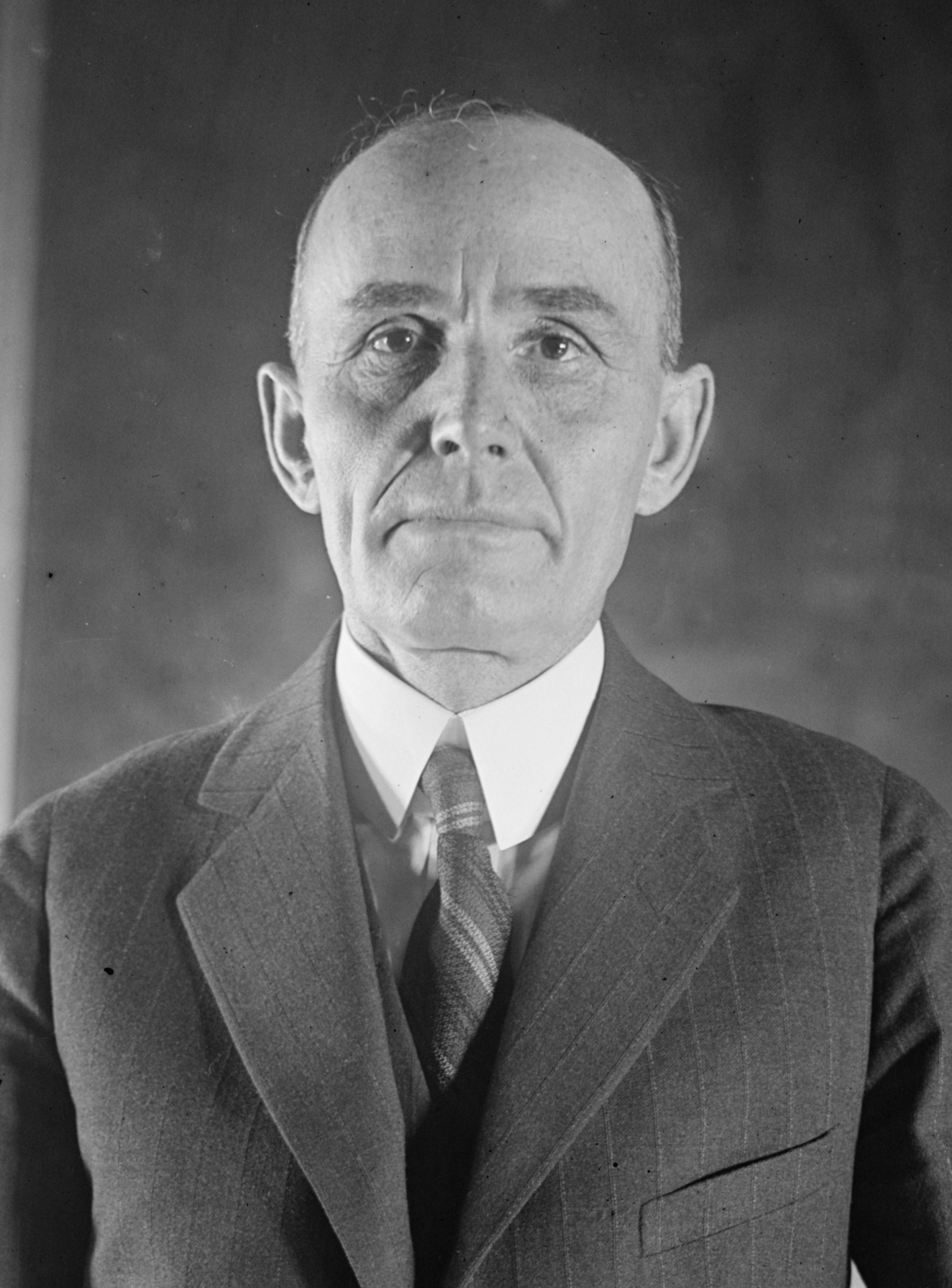
William Marion Jardine, B.S. — U.S. Secretary of Agriculture (1925–1929); U.S. Ambassador to Egypt (1930–1933)

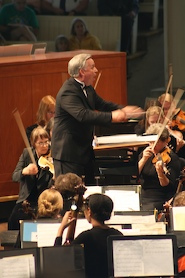
Craig Jessop, B.S. 1973 — former director of the Mormon Tabernacle Choir

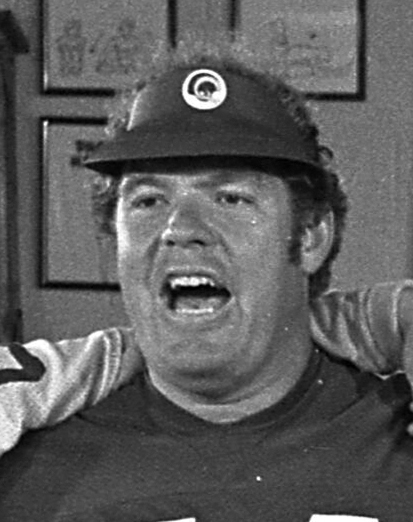
Merlin Olsen, B.S. 1962 — Pro Football Hall of Famer, actor, and broadcaster

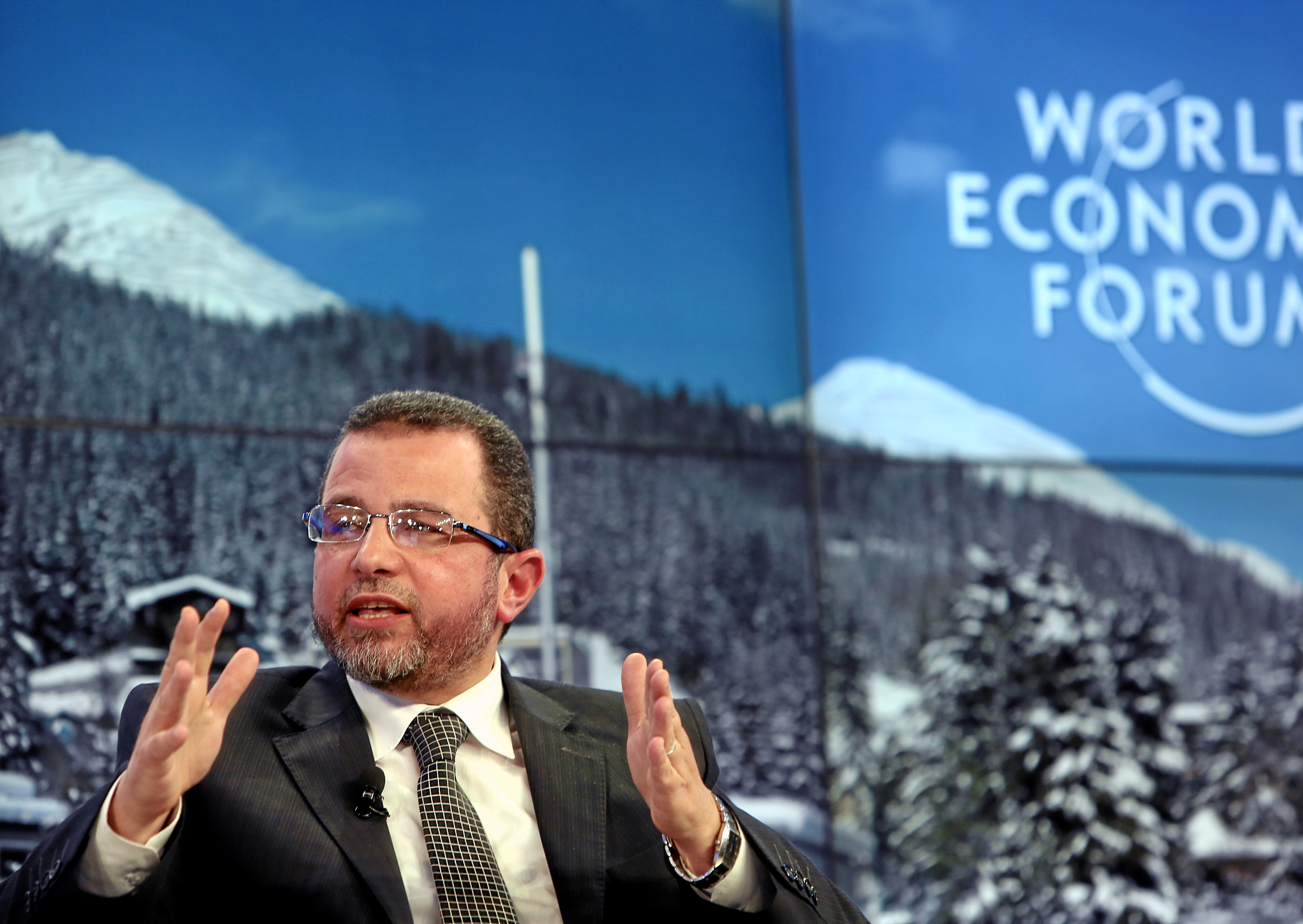
Hesham Qandil, M.S. 1988 — former Prime Minister of Egypt

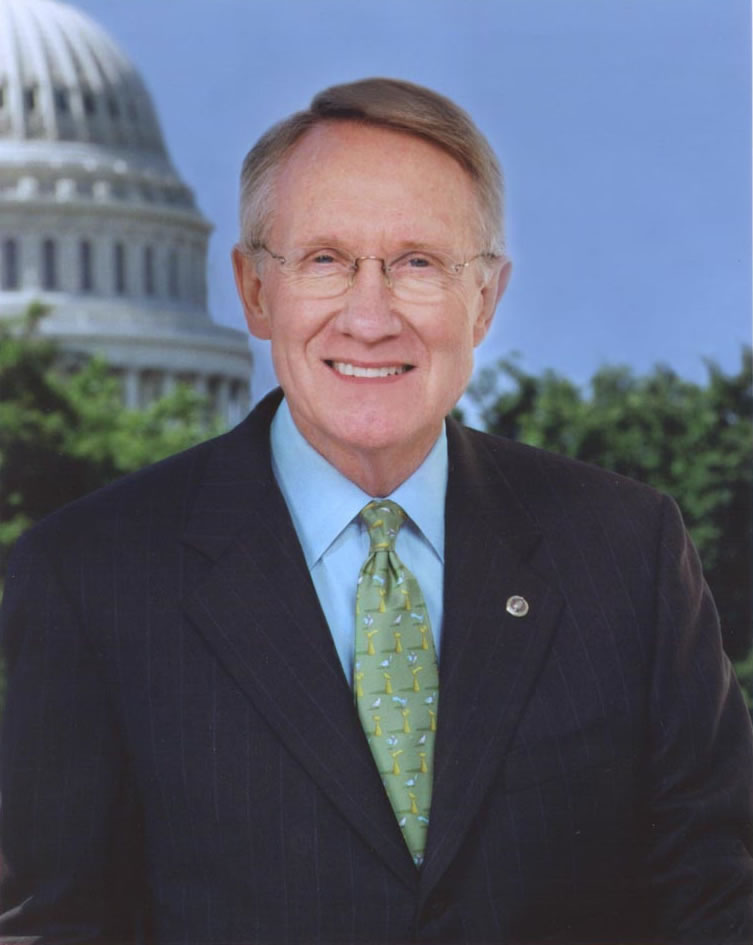
Harry Reid, B.S. 1961 — U.S. Senator and Senate Majority Leader (2007–2015)

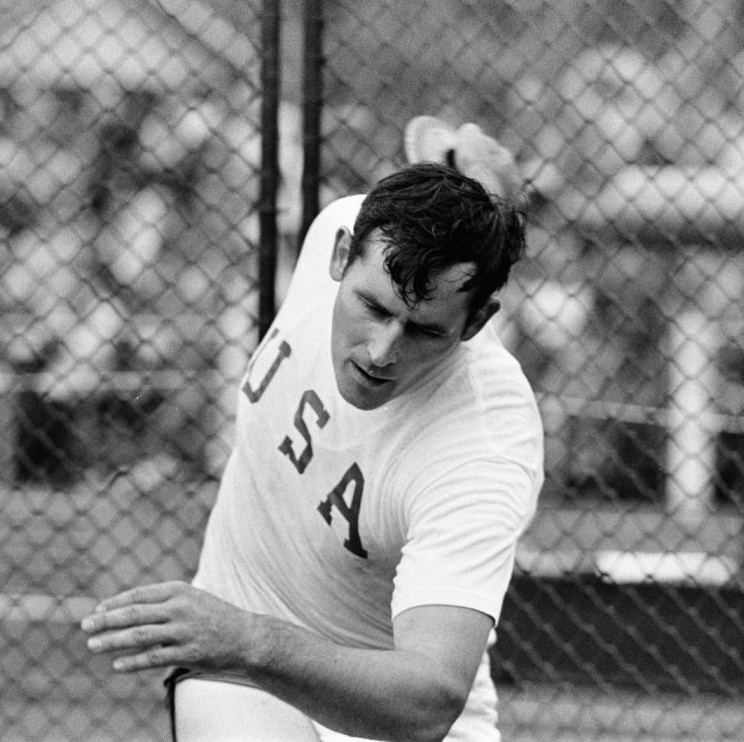
Jay Silvester, attended 1956–1959 — four-time Olympian (discus), 1972 silver medalist; former world-record holder

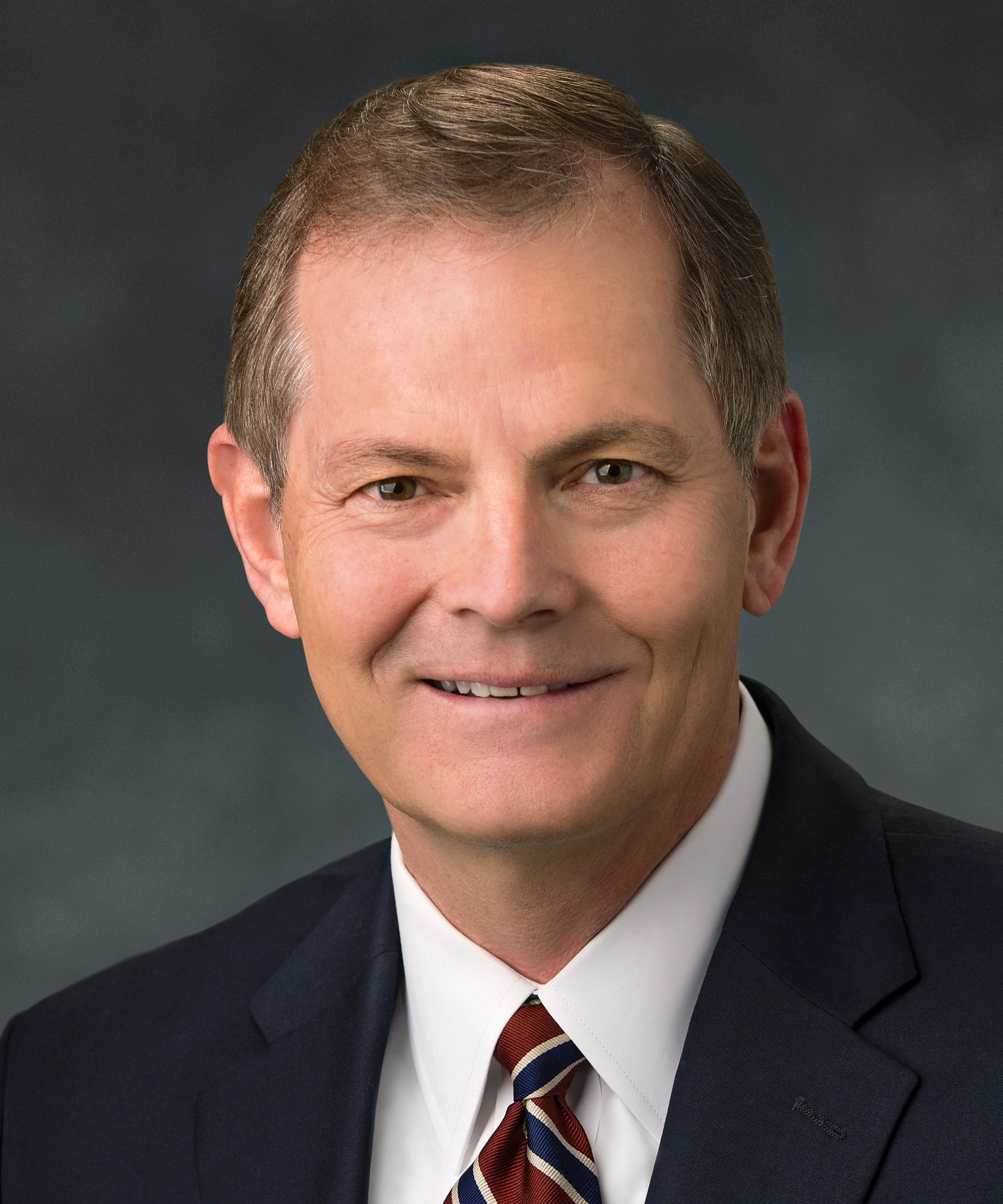
Gary E. Stevenson, B.S. 1979 — member of the Quorum of the Twelve Apostles; co-founder of ICON Health & Fitness

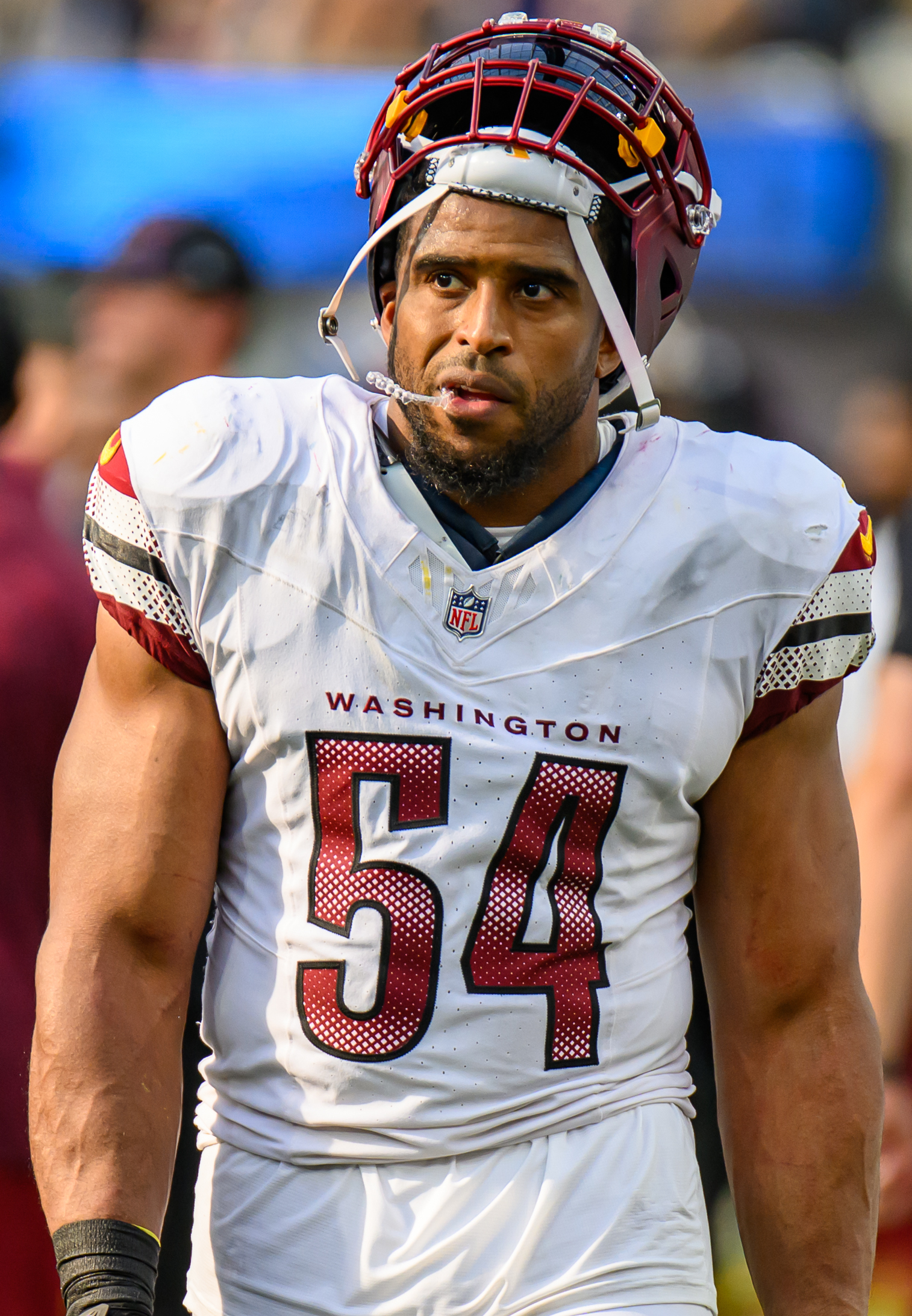
Bobby Wagner, B.S. 2012 — NFL linebacker; Super Bowl XLVIII champion; NFL 2010s All-Decade Team

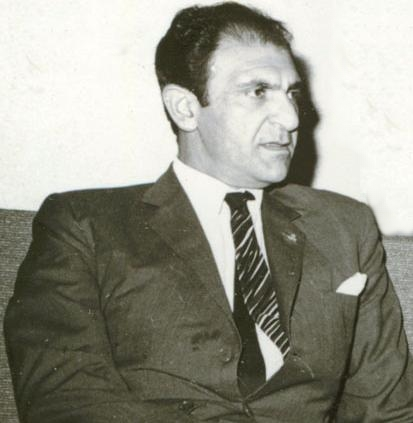
Ardeshir Zahedi, B.S. 1950 — former Iranian Foreign Minister and Ambassador to the United States

== See also ==
- List of land-grant universities
- List of colleges and universities in Utah
- Chase Fine Arts Center
- Nora Eccles Harrison Museum of Art
- Small Satellite Conference
- Utah State University Aggie Marching Band
