= Brewster H. Shaw =

American astronaut and USAF colonel (born 1945)

Brewster Shaw
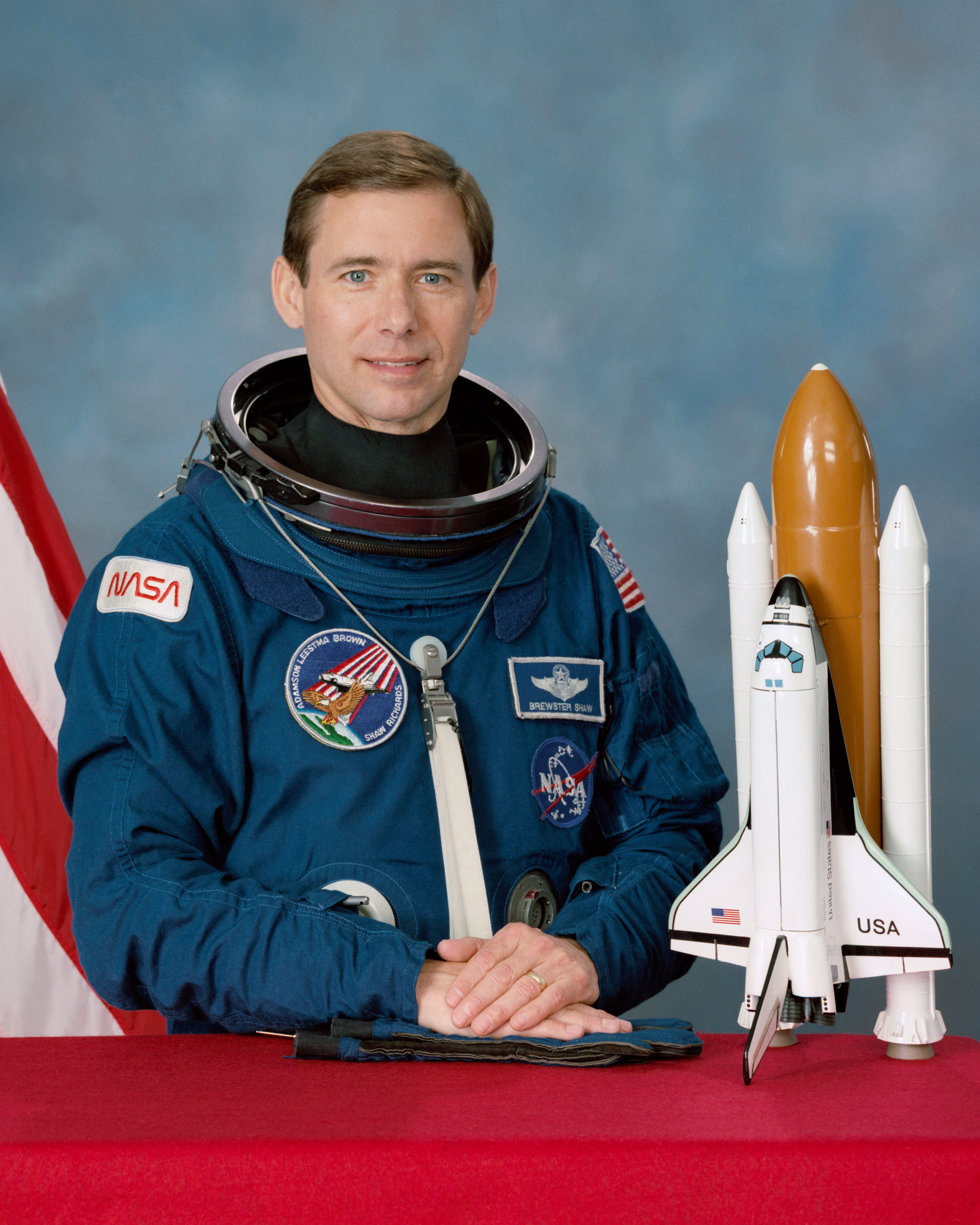
- Born: Brewster Hopkinson Shaw Jr. May 16, 1945 (age 81); Cass City, Michigan, U.S.
- Education: University of Wisconsin, Madison (BS, MS)
- Space career

NASA astronaut
- Rank: Colonel, USAF
- Time in space: 22d 5h 51m
- Selection: NASA Group 8 (1978)
- Mission: STS-9; STS-61-B; STS-28
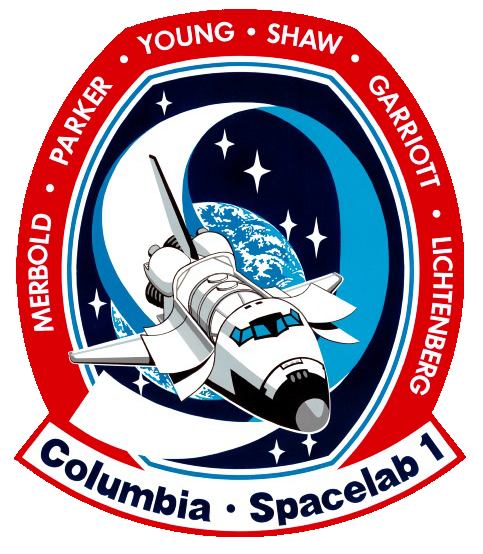
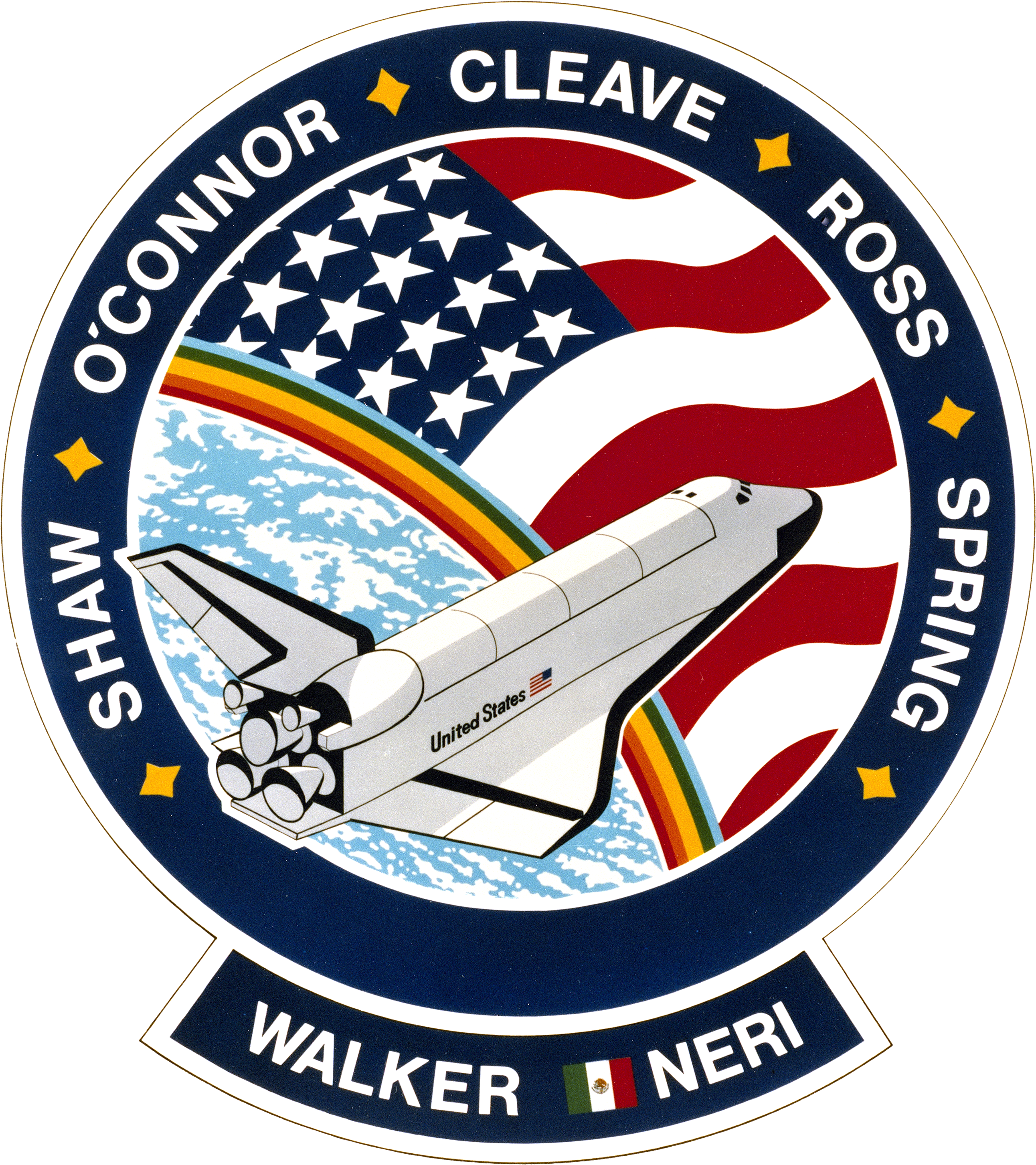
- Mission insignia

Brewster Hopkinson Shaw Jr. (born May 16, 1945) is a retired NASA astronaut, colonel of the U.S. Air Force, and former Boeing executive. Shaw was inducted into the U.S. Astronaut Hall of Fame on May 6, 2006.

Shaw is a veteran of three Space Shuttle missions and has logged 533 hours of space flight. He was Pilot of Space Shuttle Columbia in November 1983, Commander of Atlantis in November 1985 and Commander of Columbia in August 1989.

Following the Challenger disaster in 1986, he supported the Rogers Presidential Commission which investigated the accident. Shaw subsequently led the Space Shuttle Orbiter Return-to-Flight team chartered to enhance the safety of the vehicles' operations.

Shaw worked as a manager at NASA until 1996 when he left the agency, retired from the Air Force, and went to work in the private sector as an aerospace executive.

== Early life and education ==
Shaw is the son of Brewster H. Shaw, Sr. He was born May 16, 1945, and grew up in Michigan. He graduated from Cass City High School in Cass City, Michigan, in 1963. Shaw received a Bachelor of Science degree in Engineering Mechanics from the University of Wisconsin–Madison in 1968. He completed a Master of Science degree in Engineering Mechanics in 1969, also at UW-Madison. Shaw joined the Delta Upsilon fraternity while attending the university.

While attending college Shaw was a member of a band called The Gentlemen. He credits his flying career to a fellow band member: "Our drummer, Steve Schimming, had a private pilot's license, and one day he took me up in his plane. From that moment on, I wanted to be a pilot."

== U.S. Air Force pilot ==
Shaw entered the Air Force in 1969 after completing Officer Training School and attended undergraduate pilot training at Craig Air Force Base in Alabama. He received his pilot wings in 1970 and was then assigned to the F-100 Replacement Training Unit at Luke Air Force Base in Arizona.

In April 1973 Shaw reported to George Air Force Base, California, for F-4 instructor duties. Shaw attended the USAF Test Pilot School at Edwards Air Force Base, California, starting in July 1975. Following the completion of this training, he remained at Edwards AFB as an operational test pilot. He served as a flight instructor at the Test Pilot School from August 1977 to July 1978.

== NASA career ==
Shaw was selected by NASA to be an astronaut in January 1978 where he served on loan from the Air Force.

=== Spaceflight missions ===
==== STS-9 ====
Shaw's first trip to space was as Pilot on STS-9 Columbia from November 28 to December 8, 1983.

His fellow crew included Commander John W. Young, mission specialists, Owen Garriott and Robert Parker, and payload specialists, Byron Lichtenberg and Ulf Merbold. This was the largest crew to fly aboard a single spacecraft, the first international Shuttle crew and the first to carry payload specialists.

The crew conducted more than seventy multi-disciplinary scientific and technical investigations in the fields of life sciences, atmospheric physics and earth observations, astronomy and solar physics, space plasma physics, and materials processing. After ten days of Spacelab hardware verification and around-the-clock scientific operations, Columbia and its laboratory cargo (the heaviest payload to be returned to Earth in the shuttle's cargo bay) returned to land on the dry lake bed at Edwards AFB.

==== STS-61-B ====
Shaw first served as Shuttle Commander on STS-61-B Atlantis. The mission launched at night on November 26 and returned on December 3, 1985.

The crew included Commander Shaw; Pilot Bryan O'Connor; mission specialists Mary Cleave, Jerry Ross, and Woody Spring; as well as payload specialists Rodolfo Neri Vela (Mexico), and Charles Walker (McDonnell Douglas).

During the mission the crew deployed the communications satellites, conducted two six-hour spacewalks to demonstrate space station construction techniques with the EASE/ACCESS experiments, operated the Continuous Flow Electrophoresis (CRFES) experiment for McDonnell Douglas and a Getaway Special (GAS) container for Telesat, conducted several Mexican payload specialist experiments for the Mexican Government and tested the Orbiter Experiments Digital Autopilot (OEX DAP). This was the heaviest payload weight carried to orbit by the shuttle to date. After completing 108 orbits of the Earth in 165 hours, Shaw landed Atlantis on Runway 22 at Edwards AFB.

Brewster Shaw told the NASA oral historian for STS-61-B that he installed a padlock on the hatch control because he was "particularly concerned" that the Mexican Rodolfo Neri Vela could "flip out" during the mission. Shaw noted that he did not think that Neri Vela noticed the padlock at the time, but that other members of the crew did.

==== STS-28 ====
Shaw was the commander of STS-28 Columbia (August 8–13, 1989). The mission included Pilot Dick Richards and three mission specialists: Jim Adamson, Dave Leestma and Mark Brown. The shuttle carried classified Department of Defense payloads and a number of secondary payloads. After 80 orbits of Earth the five-day mission concluded with a dry lake bed landing on Runway 17 at Edwards AFB.

=== NASA management ===
Shaw left Johnson Space Center in October 1989 to assume the NASA Headquarters senior executive position of Deputy Director, Space Shuttle Operations, located at the Kennedy Space Center. As operations manager, Shaw was responsible for all operational aspects of the Space Shuttle program and had Level-II authority over shuttle elements from the time the orbiters left the Orbiter Processing Facility (OPF), were mated to the external tank and solid rocket boosters, transported to the launch pad, launched, recovered, and returned to the OPF. He was the final authority for launch decisions, and chaired the Mission Management Team.

Shaw moved on to serve as the deputy program manager for the shuttle. In addition to the duties he previously held, he also shared with the shuttle program manager full authority and responsibility for the conduct of the shuttle program.

He then served as Director, Space Shuttle Operations, with responsibility for the development of all shuttle elements, including the orbiter, external tank, solid rocket boosters, and shuttle main engines, the facilities required to support mission operations, and in the planning necessary to efficiently conduct shuttle operations.

== Aerospace executive ==
=== Rockwell and Boeing ===
Shaw joined Rockwell in 1996 after 27 years with the Air Force and NASA. The Boeing Company acquired Rockwell in December 1996.

Initially, Shaw served as director of major programs for the Boeing Space and Defense Group. Then he became vice president and program manager of International Space Station (ISS) electrical power systems at Rocketdyne Propulsion and Power. The contract included the development, test, evaluation and production of the electrical power system to be assembled in space during multiple space shuttle launches. Shaw's next role was to lead the consolidated Boeing teams at Huntsville, Alabama, Canoga Park and Huntington Beach, California, in the design, development, test, evaluation, production and flight preparation of ISS hardware and software. Boeing was NASA's prime contractor and supplier for the ISS.

=== United Space Alliance ===
In mid-2003, Brewster Shaw left Boeing and became the chief operating officer of United Space Alliance (USA). In that position he had primary responsibility for the day-to-day operations and overall management of USA, the prime contractor for the shuttle program, and its 10,000 employees in Florida, Texas, Alabama and Russia.

=== Return to Boeing ===
In January 2006 he returned to Boeing's Houston campus, to serve as the vice president and general manager of the company's division which controls the ISS and shuttle programs.

He retired from Boeing on August 26, 2011.

== Personal life ==
He is married and is the father of three children. His youngest son, Brandon (born in 1976), was murdered by carjackers in Austin, Texas in July 1997.

Shaw is a descendant of William Brewster of the Mayflower.

== Awards and honors ==
Shaw has earned numerous honors and awards including 28 medals in the Vietnam War. He received the Defense Superior Service Medal, the Air Force Distinguished Flying Cross with seven oak leaf clusters and the Defense Meritorious Service Medal.
