= Ricardo Peralta y Fabi =

Ricardo Peralta
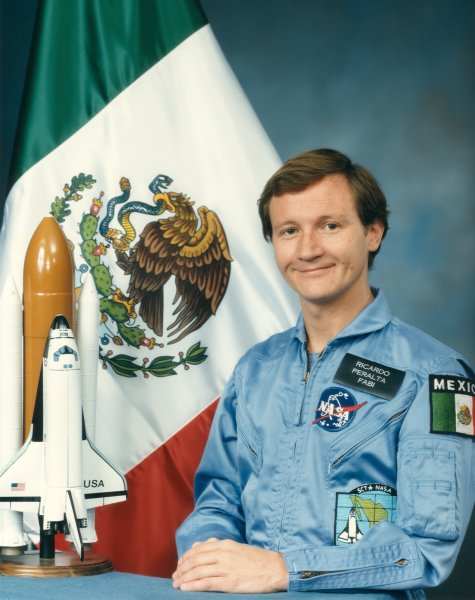
- Ricardo Peralta (NASA photo)
- Born: Ricardo Peralta y Fabi; August 15, 1950; Mexico City
- Died: October 16, 2016 (aged 66); Mexico City
- Occupations: Mexican astronaut selectee, engineer, professor
- Known for: Being the alternate for Rodolfo Neri Vela, the first Mexican astronaut
- Children: Ernesto Peralta Medina, Emiliano Peralta Medina, Liliana Peralta Magallón
- Status: Retired in 1985
- Space career

Mexican astronaut
- Selection: 1985

Ricardo Peralta y Fabi (Note: In this Hispanic American name, the first or paternal surname is Peralta and the second or maternal family name is Fabi. The surnames are also given as Peralta-Fabi, particularly in academic contexts.) (August 15, 1950 – October 16, 2016) was a Mexican mechanical engineer and former astronaut trainee who was a backup for astronaut Rodolfo Neri Vela on STS-61-B. Peralta was one of three people selected among 400 applicants to the Mexican space program. (Note: The third was Francisco Javier Mendieta Jiménez.)

== Accident ==
In 1985, months before STS-61-B's mission was carried out, Peralta had an accident flying in an ultralight aircraft, which he had bought with part of the money destined for his astronaut training. Up until this point, he was the official alternate for the first Mexican astronaut Rodolfo Neri Vela, in case Neri Vela could not carry out the future mission for any reason. Peralta was seriously injured in the accident, resulting in him being incapacitated from completing the astronaut training by the Mexican Space Agency and the training at Indiana University. He left the corps of astronauts on December 3, 1985.

He taught at the National Autonomous University of Mexico (UNAM) for many years after his astronaut career and died in 2016.

== See also ==
- List of Hispanic astronauts
