= STS-61 (disambiguation) =

NASA flew a number of Space Shuttle missions in the early and mid-1980s with designations derived from STS-61.

The ambiguity was the result of a NASA decision to change designation of missions starting in Fiscal Year 1984. Previously, missions were designated in the order they were flown (i.e., STS-9 indicated the ninth shuttle mission). The new designation was designed to accommodate a dramatically increased launch manifest, address the addition of a west coast launch site and to resolve confusion from manifested missions not being flown in order due to delays. The new designation used a three-part designator following the term "STS". The first number represents the fiscal year of the launch, the second represents the launch location (1=Florida, 2=California) and the alphanumeric code represents the order launched (i.e., A is first, B is second, etc.). Therefore, the first mission using this designation, which was the tenth shuttle mission was STS 41B. It launched in FY 1984, from Florida and was the first to launch in that year.

As a result of the Challenger accident (STS 51L), a decision was made to no longer fly DoD payloads and commercial payloads on the orbiter and cancel flights from California. Thus, the manifest was dramatically reduced and NASA returned to the old designation with STS 26 and the return to flight in 1988.

STS-61 itself was flown in 1993.

Other STS-61s include:

- STS-61-A
- STS-61-B
- STS-61-C
