= Francisco Javier Mendieta =

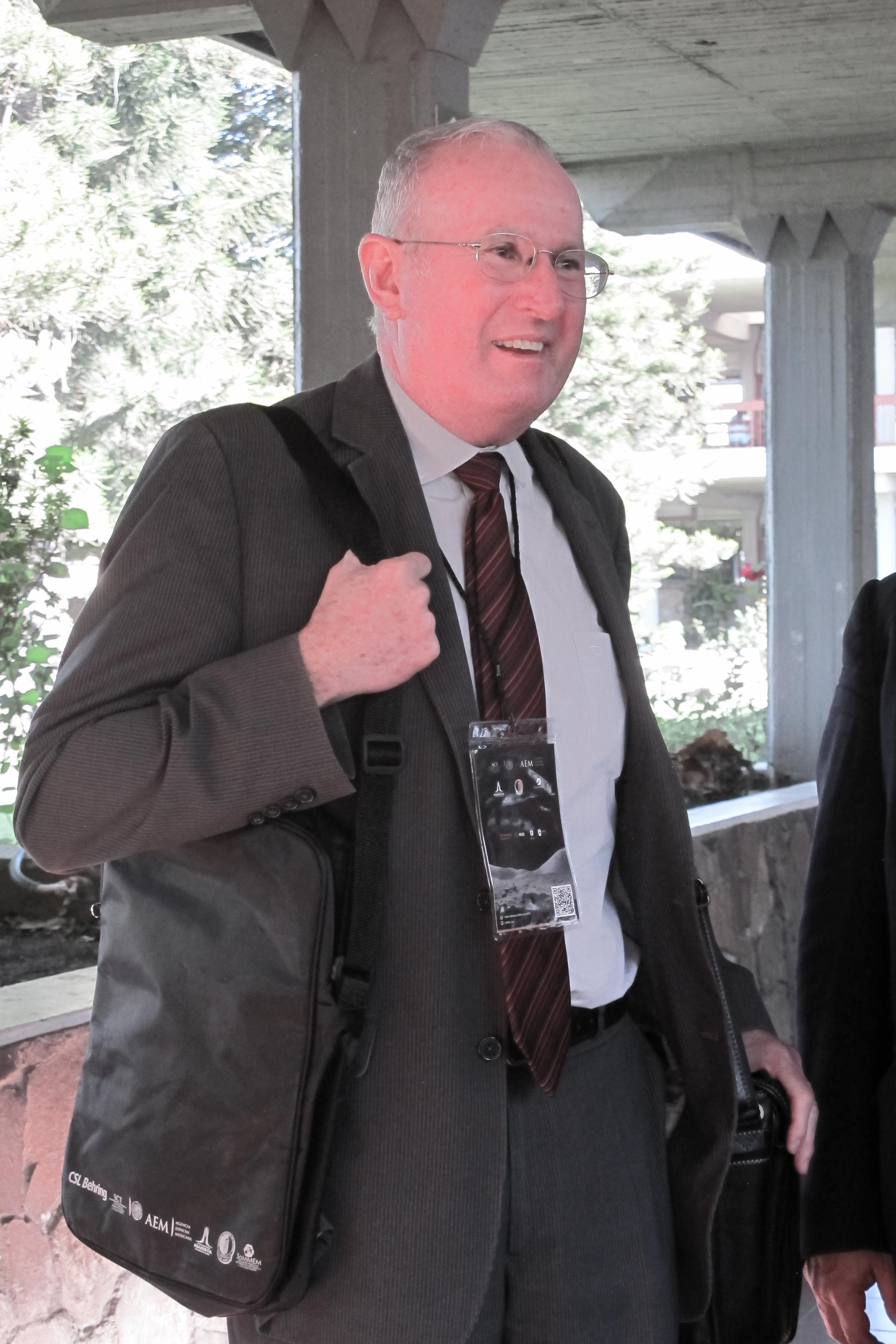

Director of the Mexican Space Agency
- In office 2 November 2011 – 2019
- Succeeded by: Salvador Landeros Ayala

Personal details
- Born: Francisco Javier Mendieta Jiménez; 28 November 1955 (age 70) San Luis Potosí, Mexico
- Education: UNAM and Télécom ParisTech
- Notable awards: Emilio Rosenblueth Prize, Mexican Academy of Engineering

Francisco Javier Mendieta Jiménez (born 28 November 1955 in San Luis Potosí) is a Mexican telecommunications engineer and academic who chaired the Ensenada Center for Scientific Research and Higher Education (Cicese) and served, by presidential appointment, as the founding director-general of the Mexican Space Agency from 2011 to 2019.

Mendieta graduated with a bachelor's degree in Mechanical and Electrical Engineering from the National Autonomous University of Mexico (UNAM) and earned both a master's degree and a doctorate in Telecommunications at the École Nationale Supérieure des Télécommunications (also known as Télécom ParisTech) in Paris, France.

He has conducted experiments for the National Aeronautics and Space Administration (NASA) of the United States and, for the STS-61-B Atlantis mission, he was designated as an eventual substitute of Rodolfo Neri Vela, the reserve payload specialist who became the first Mexican national in space.
