= Fabi =

Fabi may refer to:

- Fabi (surname), Italian surname
- Fabi (currency), Chinese currency
- FabI, a bacterial enzyme

== See also ==
- Fabbi
- Fabia
- Fabio
