= Agencia Espacial Mexicana =

National space agency of Mexico

Mexican Space Agency
- Agencia Espacial Mexicana
- AEM logo since 2022

Agency overview
- Abbreviation: AEM
- Formed: July 31, 2010; 16 years ago
- Type: Space agency
- Jurisdiction: Secretariat of Infrastructure, Communications and Transportation
- Headquarters: Mexico City, Mexico 19°21′39″N 99°10′59″W
- Official language: Spanish
- Administrator: Salvador Landeros Ayala
- Owner: Mexico
- Annual budget: ▼$63.6 million MXN (US$ 3.2 million) (2021)
- Website: https://www.gob.mx/aem

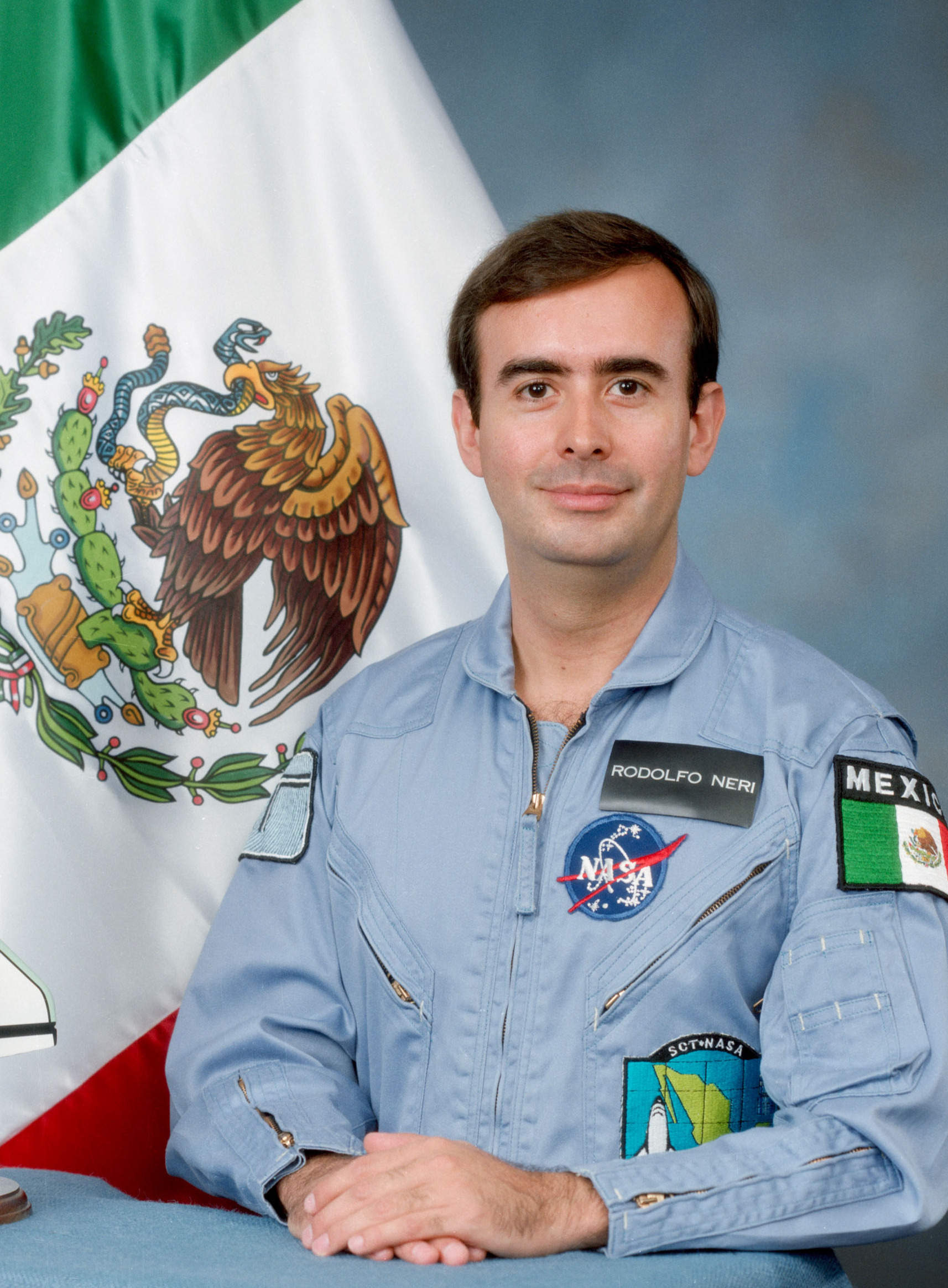
Rodolfo Neri Vela, first astronaut of Mexico

The Mexican Space Agency (AEM; Spanish: Agencia Espacial Mexicana) is the national space agency of Mexico, established in July 2010. The agency does not have infrastructure, and aims to promote and coordinate education, research and development of the space-related activities that are performed in the country.

== History ==
The direct antecedent of the agency is the Comisión Nacional del Espacio Exterior (CONEE) (English: National Commission of Outer Space), an office created by Presidential decree on August 31, 1962, and attached to the Secretariat of Communications and Transportation which conducted experiments in rocketry, telecommunications and atmospheric studies from 1962 to 1976. After its dissolution by Presidential decree, on November 3, 1977, some activities were financed by the extinct Instituto Mexicano de Comunicaciones (Mexican Communications Institute) (transformed into the current Comisión Federal de Telecomunicaciones), by Satmex – then a state-owned company – and some higher education institutions, such as the Universidad Nacional Autónoma de México, the Institution Politécnico Nacional, the Instituto Nacional de Astrofísica, Óptica y Electrónica, the Centro de Investigación Científica y de Educación Superior de Ensenada and the CINVESTAV.

=== Presentation at Congress ===
The bill for the foundation of a formal space agency, was originally conceived by José Luis Garcia and Fernando de la Peña. It was reviewed by Gianfranco Bissiacchi, José Hernández, Rodolfo Neri Vela among others. It was then submitted.

The developers presented a bill to Congress whose main purpose was, according to Fernando de la Peña, promote private investment and facilitate the creation of multinational aerospace companies in the state of Hidalgo.

The agency was approved by the Chamber of Deputies (208 voted yes, 2 no and 4 absentees) on April 20, 2010, after receiving a significant vote of confidence on April 26, 2006.

=== Submission to the Senate ===
There were protests and concerns of some sectors that were displeased at not being consulted before being presented to the Chamber of Deputies for a vote. For this reason, the PRD Senator and president of the Committee on Science and Technology of the Senate, Francisco Javier Castellón Fonseca, requested the organization of forums to identify any concerns and disagreements. Afterwards the 'Grupo Promotor de la Agencia Espacial Mexicana' was created and coordinated by the Academia de Ingeniería (English: Engineering Academy) made a new initiative of law for the Mexican Congress. To this proposal some comments were included, particularly from the Consejo Nacional de Ciencia y Tecnología, and the Consejo Consultivo de Ciencias de la Presidencia de la República (Science Advisory Board of the Presidency of the Republic). The new initiative ended up being adopted by the Senate unanimously on November 4, 2008, and returned to the chamber of origin to be turned over to the committees on science and technology, legislative studies second, and budget and public accounts to undergo a second analysis and ballot.

=== Establishment ===
The law that creates the agency was published by President Felipe Calderón on July 30, 2010, and came into effect on July 31, 2010. The first governing board was established on 7 September 2010. The board organised a series of forums with space experts to outline a space policy, that was published on 13 July 2011. On 1 November 2011 Francisco Javier Mendieta Jiménez was appointed as Director General.

== Activities ==
The agency is in its early stages of identifying and defining needs and objectives. It is currently holding forums to develop clear goals and strategies in the aerospace industry sector. In 2012, funding was pledged for an educational satellite, but it was not awarded. On 10 December 2017, a stratospheric balloon flight carrying a gondola, Nanoconect-1, was declared the first "satellite" launched by AEM, and from Mexican territory.

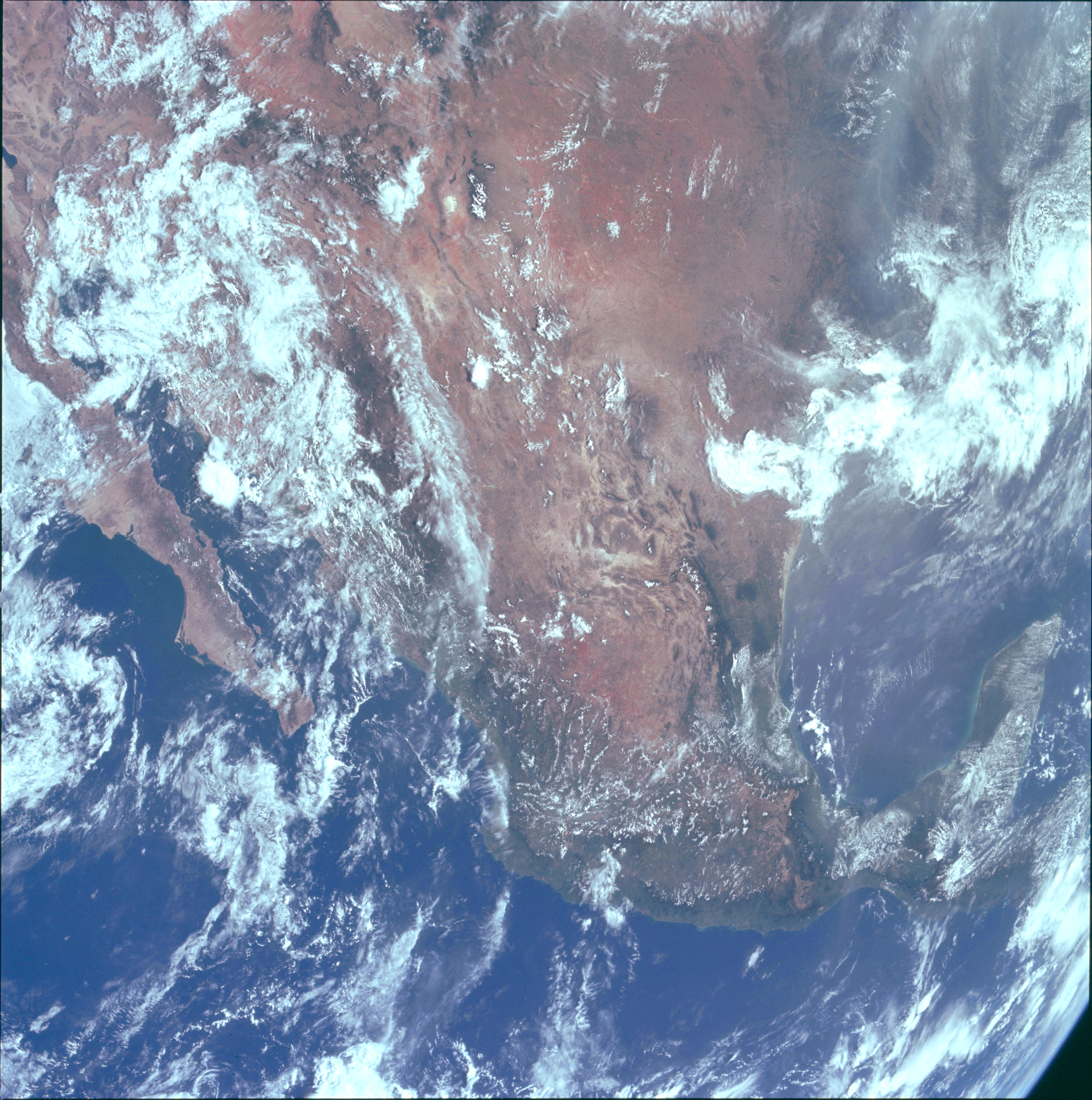
Mexico as seen from space during the Apollo 11 mission.

In June 2015 AEM signed a launch contract to transport micro-rovers as secondary payloads on Astrobotic Technology's lunar lander called Peregrine, now planned for a 2023 launch. But in 2019, Astrobotics' flight manifest shows that AEM will now fly an instrument, not rovers.

== See also ==
- List of government space agencies
- List of space agencies
- Carmen Victoria Felix Chaidez
