= Carmen Victoria Félix Chaidez =

Mexican scientist and engineer

Carmen Félix
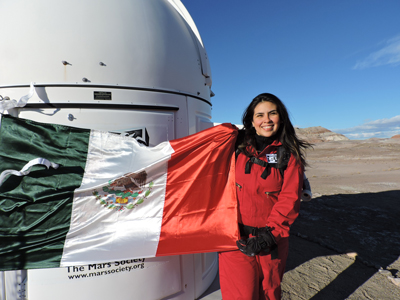
- Félix in 2018
- Born: Carmen Victoria Félix Chaidez; 26 October 1985 (age 40); Culiacán, Mexico
- Education: Monterrey Institute of Technology and Higher Education
- Occupation: Scientist

Carmen Victoria Félix Chaidez is a scientist, engineer, and the first Mexican to work on simulations for future Mars missions with space analogs. She has been credited in part for creating the Mexican Space Agency and promoting space-related careers in her native country. Her work has been recognized by her home state of Sinaloa and Quien magazine named her as one of 50 Mexicans transforming the country in 2017.

== Formation ==
Félix was born in 1985 and raised in Culiacán, Sinaloa, Mexico.

One night when she was five, Félix went out at night with her father to look at the stars. He taught her to identify constellations such as Orion and Pleiades. Studying the night sky became a favorite activity for the young girl. She grew up reading about the Apollo Moon missions and other space exploration, and she decided early she wanted a career in space.

When she was twelve, she gained access to the Internet and immediately went to study NASA's website, looking for information about how to become an astronaut. She wanted to study astronomy or aerospace engineering, but those fields were not available in Culiacan. She decided to study at a local international commerce school in the city. While there, she found out about a group of engineers going to visit NASA in Houston. The congress was the same week as the midterms, but despite being against the rules, she convinced all of her professors to let her take her exams early. She then borrowed all her savings from her parents to finance the trip. While in Houston, she visited various enterprises including the Johnson Space Center. She also attended the International Astronautical Congress, where she had an opportunity to talk to real astronauts. Her question was how to work towards a career in space, as she was from Mexico and did not have programs to support those interested in such pursuits. Astronaut Mike Massimino told her to study the sciences and engineering, fields NASA prefers, but of a type she had a passion for.

Less than two weeks after the trip, she applied to study communication and electronic engineering at Monterrey Tech, graduating in 2003. Unfortunately, she was the only one at the school at the time interested in space. Despite this, she attended space conferences and other events such as the National Astronomy Congress, which allowed her to meet people in her future field. She was also invited to join a project to conserve Chipinque Park in Monterrey, which has an observatory. It had been out of use for some time and she worked to reactivate it. She then gave classes and workshops on astronomy to student visitors.

When she graduated, she knew she wanted a master's but in something more specific to space.

== Early career ==
As there were no space-related programs in Mexico at the time, she began her career working for AT&T and Texas Instruments. Three years later, she found the opportunity to do a master's degree in space science with the International Space University (ISU), located in Strasbourg, France.

In 2002, Félix went on a trip to Houston to attend the World Space Congress and visit tech sites, She was inspired as a young woman by the young professionals who were aspiring to a career she was interested in. As she grew older and gained more experience in her field of study/career, in 2008 Félix actively worked to spread awareness and opportunities regarding space in her country. Soon after this, she became an active member of the Space Generation Advisory Council (SGAC). Eventually, Félix attended one of the first International Space Events in her native country, the VI American Space Conference (CEA).

As part of her graduate studies, Félix interned at NASA, working with the small satellite division. Here, she worked on a project to use smartphone technology to produce small satellites more economically (PhoneSat), working with developers from Google as well as other researchers from NASA.

At the end of the internship in 2009, she was asked to stay on with NASA, which she accepted even before finishing her master's program. Félix became the first and only Mexican scientist working at the agency. Her record there prompted NASA to look into finding more talent in Mexico. One year into her employment, she returned to Mexico to help the agency identify student candidates for NASA internships resulting in students from various parts of Mexico studying at various NASA centers. Another program sponsors four high school students and a teacher to spend time with NASA to learn about the work.

During that time, Félix also became involved with efforts to create the Mexican Space Agency, working with formation committees and Mexican authorities.

In 2009 she joined the Space Generation Advisory Council, representing Mexico there for four years, organizing conferences in

== Current career ==
The past years of Felix's career have been mostly focused on work related to an eventual human mission to Mars. She is an active participant with space analogs, which are dedicated to simulations and tests related to environments and situations astronauts will face with long-term stays on the red planet. She is the first Mexican scientist to be involved with this work.

In 2011, she participated in Mars Analogue Research Station Program, with the Austrian Space Forum, working to design a spacesuit specific to Mars. The project went to the Riotinto Mines in Spain, whose desert conditions are similar to that of Mars. For one week, the group camped at the site, testing the suit's mobility and communication systems.

In 2012, she was invited to teach with the Space Business and Management department of ISU, working at the Florida Institute of Technology, collaborating on a project at the Kennedy Space Center.

In 2016, she participated with the Mars Society as part of a crew simulating a mission to the planet at the Mars Desert Research Station in Utah. One of the purposes of the mission was to experience and document personal interactions among the crew forced to be together 24 hours a day in a small space. All the food was dehydrated and the living space was very small, as in a real mission. The other was to work on plant irrigation systems. Her experience with the Mars simulation made her appreciate small things such as breathing fresh air, fresh food, and all the vegetation on Earth.

Félix moved to the Netherlands to work for the International Association for the Advancement of Space Safety. She also is part of the Network of Mexican Talents Abroad in the Dutch capital. She continues to work to organize and execute Mars simulations, as well as continuing to promote space-related activities in Mexico and for its students, organizing conferences and generating funds for scholarships.

Despite her achievements, she still gets comments like "You are very pretty to be an engineer." One of her future hopes is that the first person to step on Mars is a woman, considering it fair since it was men who first stepped on the Moon. She stated "Never let anyone extinguish your dreams... I have always said that if God gave you the possibility to dream, he also gave you the possibility to make those dreams a reality."

Currently a Mexican space professional, Carmen Félix is Deputy Manager for the Space Safety Magazine and National Point of Contact in Mexico for Space Generation. In the Space Safety Magazine, Félix has contributed to quarterly publications as an authoritative source of information in the field of space safety design. Working to advance human space exploration and spaceflight, Félix has significantly contributed while developing her own experience in satellite technology. Also, Félix joined the organization "Space Generation Advisory Council (SGAC) to visit various tech sites including NASA in 2002, This organization stuck with her for many years; as she received the SGC Leadership Award in 2017, she has first-hand experienced growth of not only the organization, but herself as well. From the SGC Leadership Award, she was able to attend the Space Generation Congress and International Astronautical Congress (IAC) in Australia.

== Recognition ==
She was named an Exemplary Sinaloan in the World (Sinaloense Ejemplar en el Mundo) by her home state.

Quién magazine recognized her in 2017 as one of 50 people transforming Mexico.

== Links ==
- Episode 36: De México a Marte (From Mexico to Mars) - Duolingo podcast
