= Utah Water Research Laboratory =

Research institution at Utah State University

Coordinates: 41°44′23″N 111°47′37″W

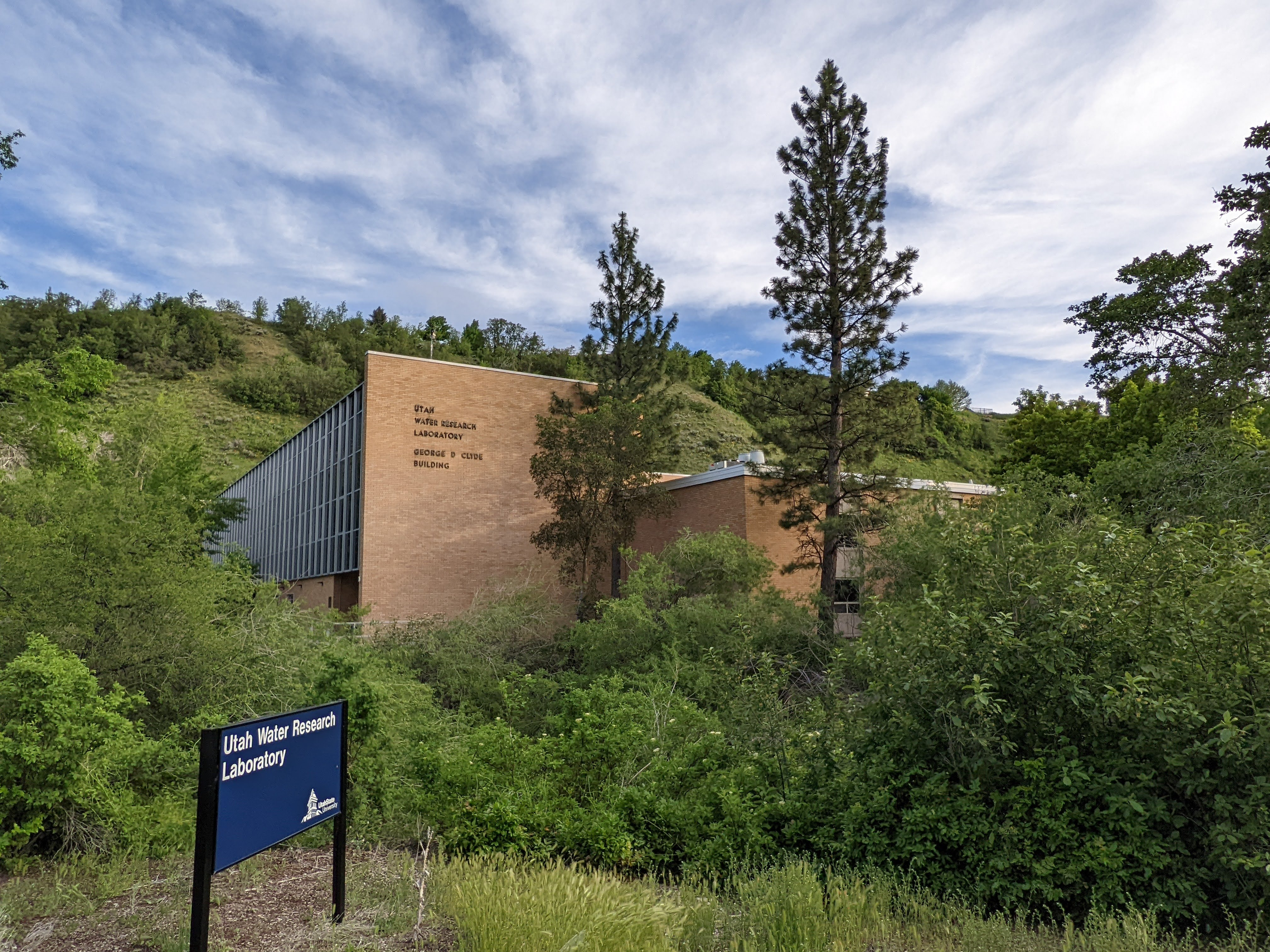
- Clyde Building
- Type: Public
- Established: 1959
- Director: David Tarboton
- Location: Logan, Utah, US
- Website: uwrl.usu.edu
- Location in Utah

The Utah Water Research Laboratory (UWRL) is a research institution at Utah State University. It is one of the largest water research facilities in the United States. The UWRL has completed more than 100 major projects around the world and operates with more than $400 million in international funding.

The UWRL was established in 1959 with funding from the Utah State Legislature, the National Science Foundation, and the National Institutes of Health, and major construction began in 1963. The building at the present location on the Logan River was completed in 1980. On September 24, 2009, the UWRL dedicated a new 11,000-square-foot hydraulics laboratory, adding to the existing 102,000-square-foot UWRL facility. The new building increased the number and scope of open channel hydraulics modeling projects possible at the UWRL. The facility holds office and laboratory space, which it dedicates mostly to research and experimentation in irrigation and water engineering. The center also provides support for numerous undergraduate and graduate degree programs in the following subject areas: water resources engineering, irrigation and drainage engineering, environmental engineering, agricultural and water resources economics, sociology and political science, watershed management, and arid land agriculture.

The Water Lab, as it is known locally, also works with the International Irrigation Center, housed in USU's College of Engineering, and has close ties with many major Middle Eastern institutions. Many high-ranking government officials and academicians in arid Middle Eastern nations received their start at the UWRL. Research performed there often applies directly to vital needs in arid nations, as a recent report listed Utah as America's second-driest state.

== Notable employees ==
- Mary L. Cleave (1947–2023) engineer and astronaut.
