= Fabi (surname) =

Fabi is an Italian surname. Notable people with this surname include:

- Claudio Fabi (born 1940), Italian record producer, composer, conductor, pianist and arranger
- Corrado Fabi (born 1961), Italian racing driver
- Manfred Fabi, Austrian curler
- Martin Fabi (1942–2023), Canadian professional football player
- Niccolò Fabi (born 1968), Italian singer-songwriter
- Randy Fabi (born 1963), Canadian professional football player
- Ricardo Peralta y Fabi (1950–2017), Mexican mechanical engineer
- Teo Fabi (born 1955), Italian racing driver
