= Mary L. Cleave =

American astronaut and engineer (1947–2023)

Mary Cleave
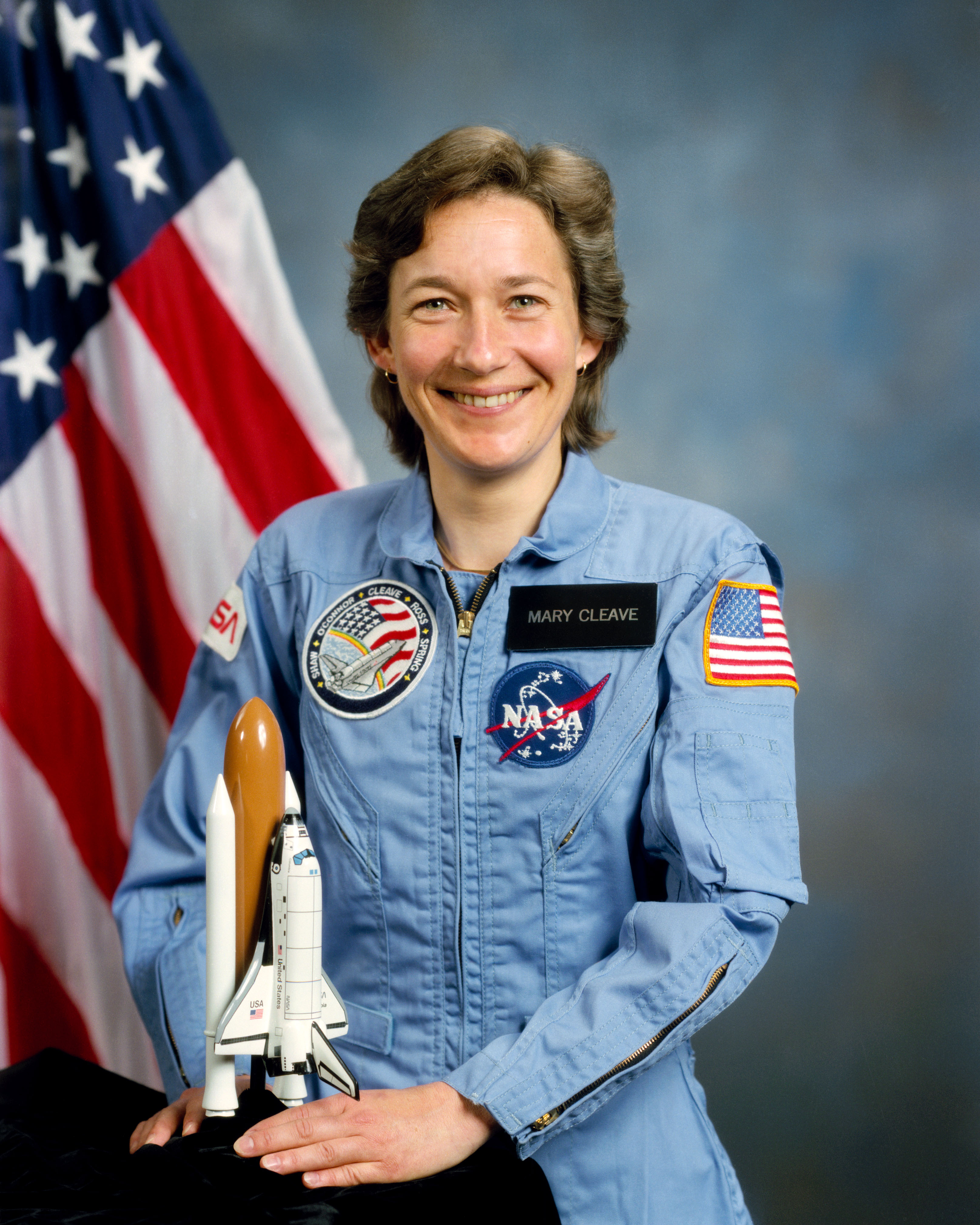
- Born: February 5, 1947; Southampton, New York, U.S.
- Died: November 27, 2023 (aged 76); Annapolis, Maryland, U.S.
- Education: Colorado State University (BS); Utah State University (MS, PhD)
- Space career

NASA astronaut
- Time in space: 10d 22h 2m
- Selection: NASA Group 9 (1980)
- Missions: STS-61-B; STS-30
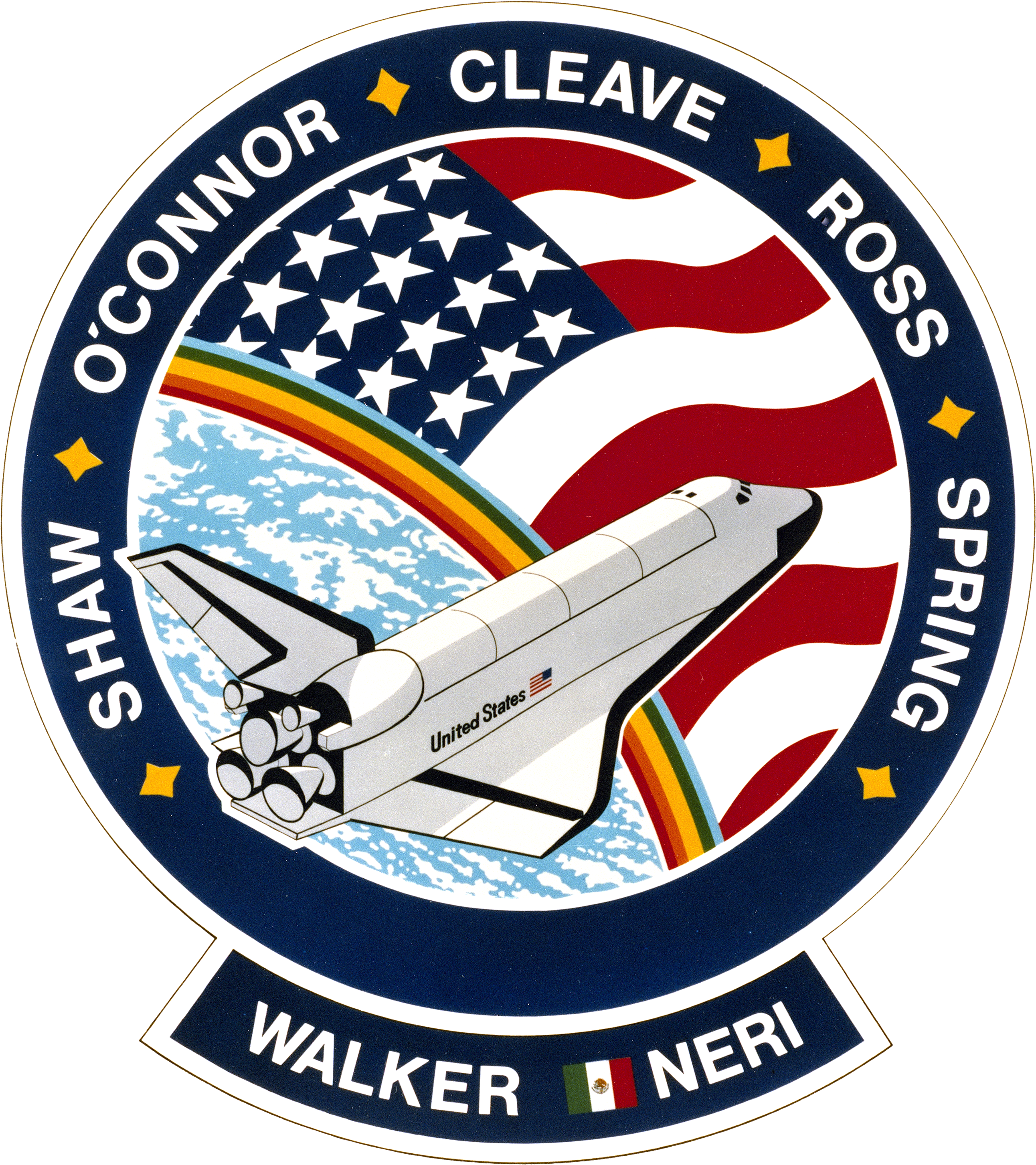
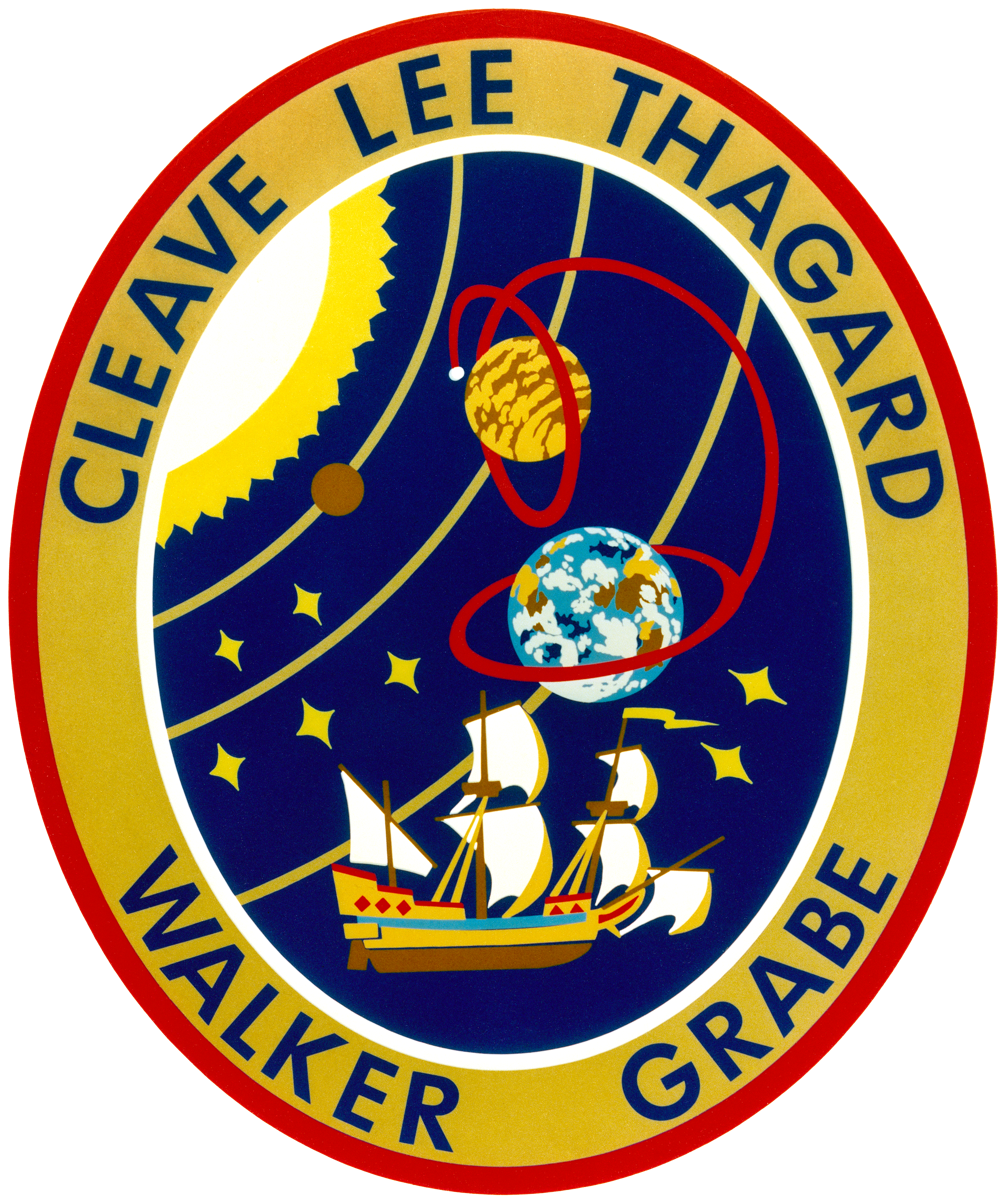
- Mission insignia
- Retired: 2007

Mary Louise Cleave (February 5, 1947 – November 27, 2023) was an American engineer and NASA astronaut. She also served from 2005 to 2007 as NASA Associate Administrator for the Science Mission Directorate.

== Early life ==
Cleave was born in Southampton, New York, the daughter of Howard Cleave and Barbara Cleave, both teachers. She grew up in Great Neck, New York, and had an older sister, Trudy Carter, and a younger one, Barbara "Bobbie" Cleave Bosworth.

== Education ==
In 1965 Cleave graduated from Great Neck North High School in Great Neck, New York. In 1969 she received a bachelor of science degree in Biological Sciences from Colorado State University, and in 1975 a master of science in Microbial Ecology from Utah State University. In 1979 she received a doctorate in Civil and Environmental Engineering from Utah State University.

== Academic career ==
Cleave held graduate research, research phycologist, and research engineer assignments in the Ecology Center and the Utah Water Research Laboratory at Utah State University from September 1971 to June 1980.

Her work included research on the productivity of the algal component of cold desert soil crusts in the Great Basin Desert south of Snowville, Utah; algal removal with intermittent sand filtration and prediction of minimum river flow necessary to maintain certain game fish and the effects of increased salinity and oil shale leachates on freshwater phytoplankton productivity. She worked on the development of the Surface Impoundment Assessment document and computer program (FORTRAN) for current and future processing of data from surface impoundments in Utah, and the design and implementation of an algal bioassay center and a workshop for bioassay techniques for the Intermountain West.

== NASA career ==
Cleave was selected as an astronaut in May 1980. Her technical assignments included: flight software verification in the Shuttle Avionics Integration Laboratory (SAIL); CAPCOM on five Space Shuttle flights; Malfunctions Procedures Book; Crew Equipment Design. A veteran of two space flights, Cleave logged a total of 10 days, 22 hours, 02 minutes, 24 seconds in space, orbited the Earth 172 times and travelled 3.94 million miles. She was a mission specialist on STS-61-B (November 26 to December 3, 1985) and STS-30 (May 4–8, 1989).

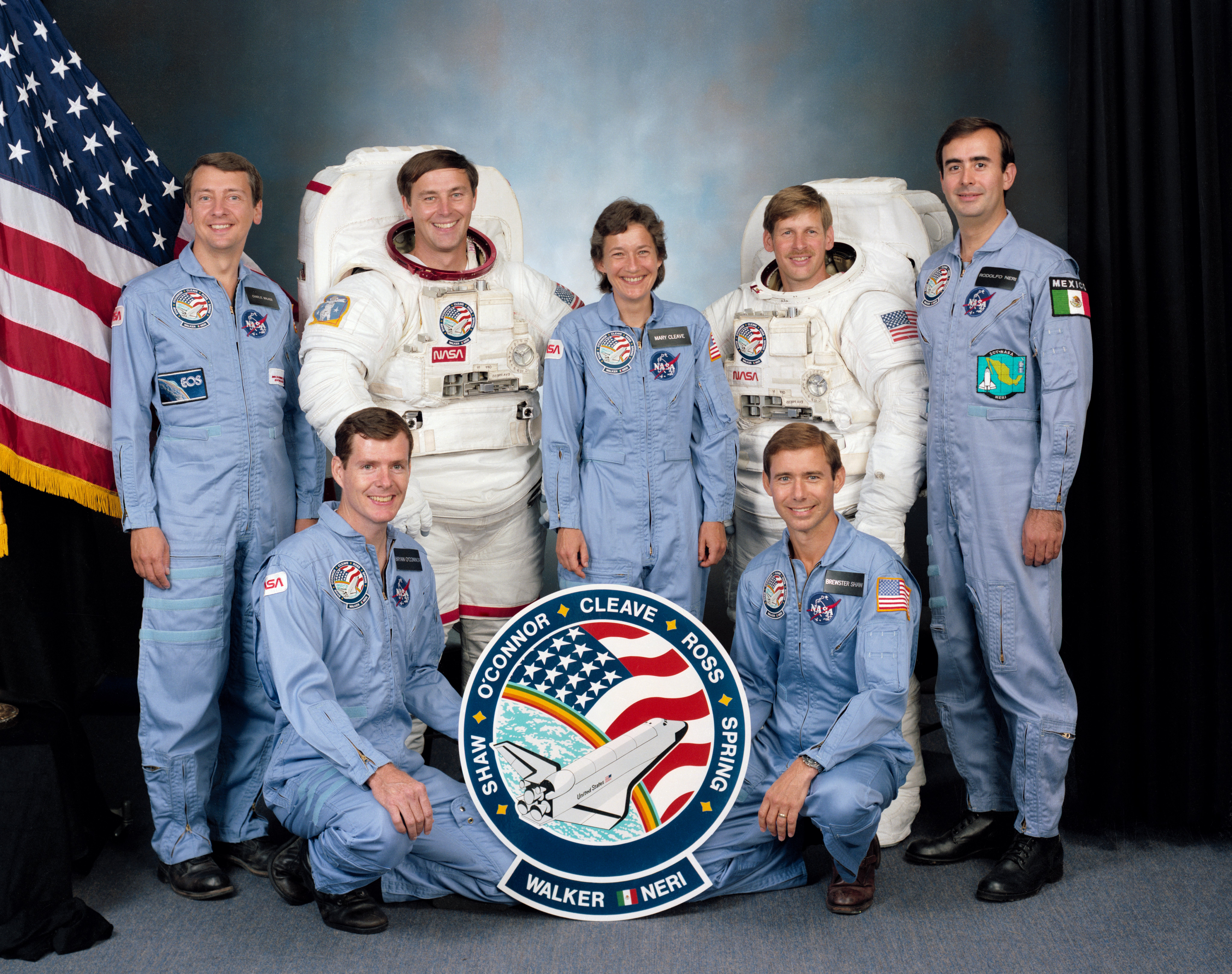
STS-61-B crew 1985

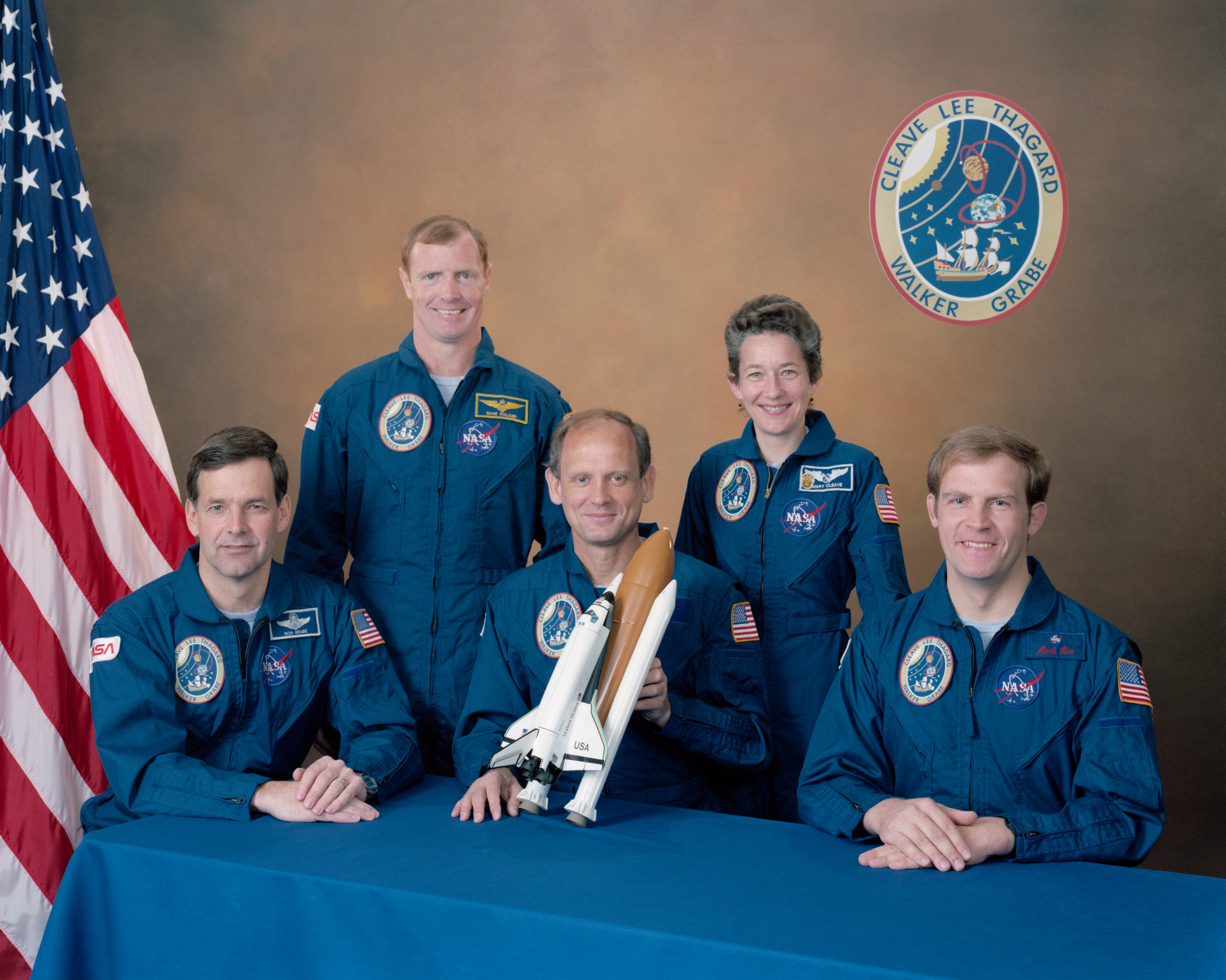
STS-30 crew 1989

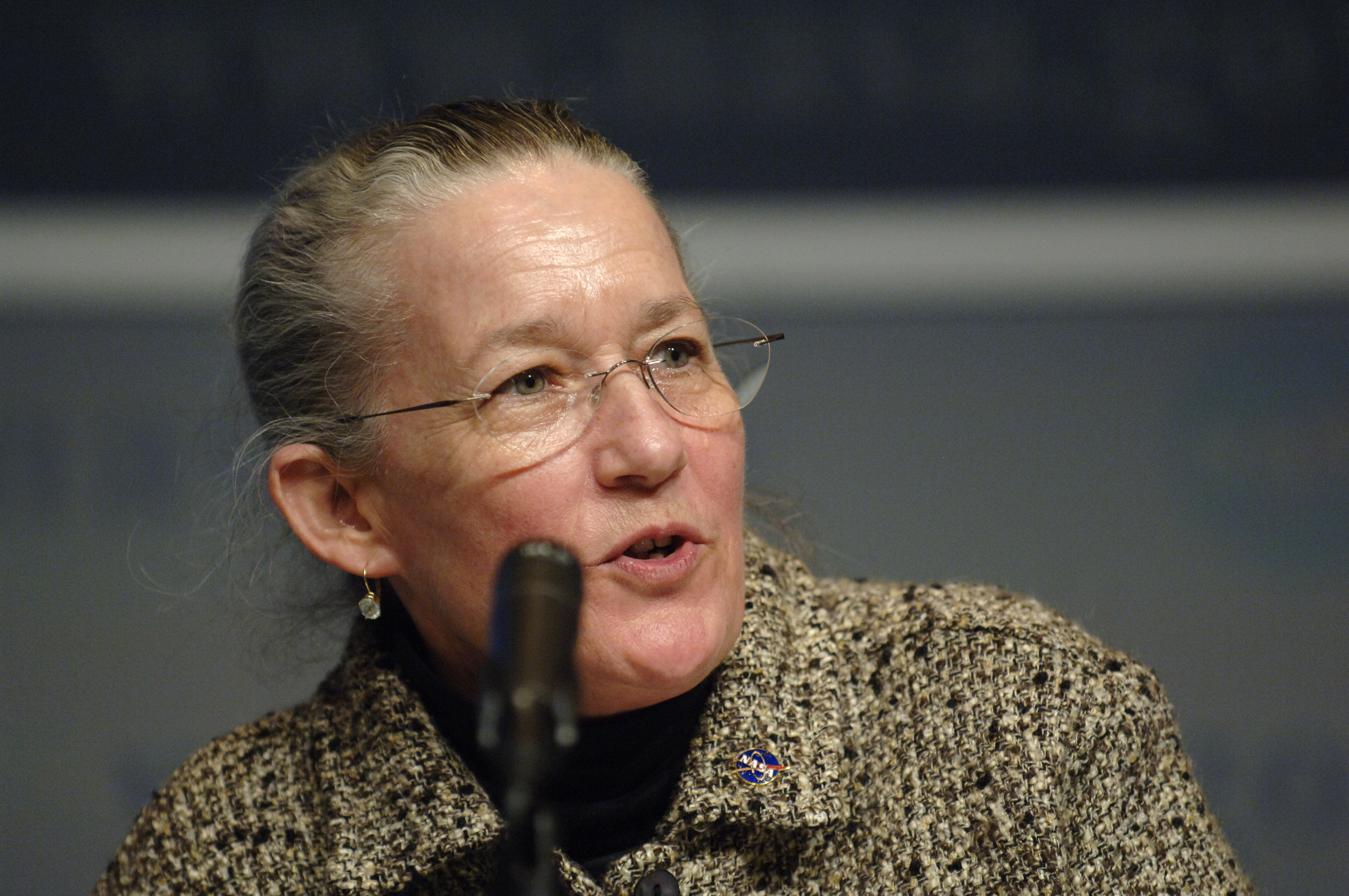
Cleave in 2006

Cleave left JSC in May 1991 to join NASA's Goddard Space Flight Center in Greenbelt, Maryland. She worked in the Laboratory for Hydrospheric Processes as the Project Manager for SeaWiFS (Sea-viewing, Wide-Field-of-view-Sensor), an ocean colour sensor which is monitoring vegetation globally. Cleave served as Associate Administrator, Science Mission Directorate, NASA Headquarters, Washington, D.C. She stepped down from that position in April 2007, and was succeeded by Dr. Alan Stern.

== Spaceflight experience ==
STS-61-B Atlantis (November 26 to December 3, 1985) launched at night from the Kennedy Space Center, Florida, and returned to land on Runway 22 at Edwards Air Force Base, California. During the mission, the crew deployed the MORELOS-B, AUSSAT II and SATCOM K-2 communications satellites, conducted two 6-hour spacewalks to demonstrate space station construction techniques with the EASE/ACCESS experiments, operated the Continuous Flow Electrophoresis (CFES) experiment for McDonnell Douglas and a Getaway Special (GAS) container for Telesat, Canada, conducted several Mexican Payload Specialist Experiments for the Mexican Government, and tested the Orbiter Experiments Digital Autopilot (OEX DAP). This was the heaviest payload weight carried to orbit by the Space Shuttle to date. The mission duration was 165 hours, 4 minutes, 49 seconds.

Looking at the Earth, particularly the Amazon rainforest, the amount of deforestation I could see, just in the five years between my two space flights down there, scared the hell out of me. — Mary L. Cleave

STS-30 on Space Shuttle Atlantis (May 4–8, 1989) was a four-day mission during which the crew successfully deployed the Magellan Venus-exploration spacecraft, the first U.S. planetary science mission launched since 1978, and the first planetary probe to be deployed from the Shuttle. Magellan arrived at Venus in August 1990 and radar-mapped over 95% of the surface of Venus. Magellan has been one of NASA's most successful scientific missions providing valuable information about the Venusian atmosphere and magnetic field. In addition, the crew also worked on secondary payloads involving Indium crystal growth, electrical storm, and Earth observation studies. The mission duration was 96 hours, 57 minutes, 35 seconds.

In early 1990, Cleave was selected as Mission Specialist 3 for the STS-42 mission but withdrew herself for personal reasons shortly after her selection was announced.

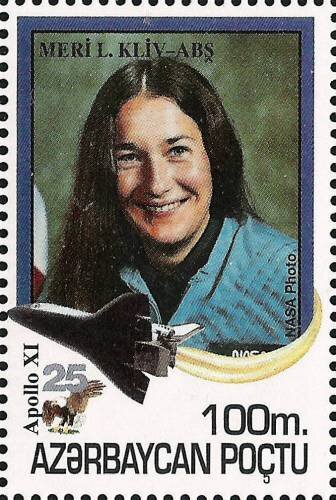
Stamp of Azerbaijan - 1995 - Mary L Cleave

== Death ==
Cleave died from a stroke at her home in Annapolis, Maryland, on November 27, 2023, at the age of 76.

== Honors and commemoration ==
In 1995 Cleave featured on a postal stamp in a series issued in Azerbaijan to commemorate the 25th anniversary of the first crewed moon landing.

On January 18, 2009, as the inaugural speaker in the Heyden Distinguished Lecture Series, Cleave told students and others at Georgetown University about her education and career and showed an original film of her shuttle mission in 1985.

== Organizations ==
- Society for Professional Engineers
- Association of Space Explorers
- Women in Aerospace
- Tri Beta, Beta Beta Beta
- Sigma Xi
- Tau Beta Pi
