= STS-61-B =

1985 American crewed spaceflight

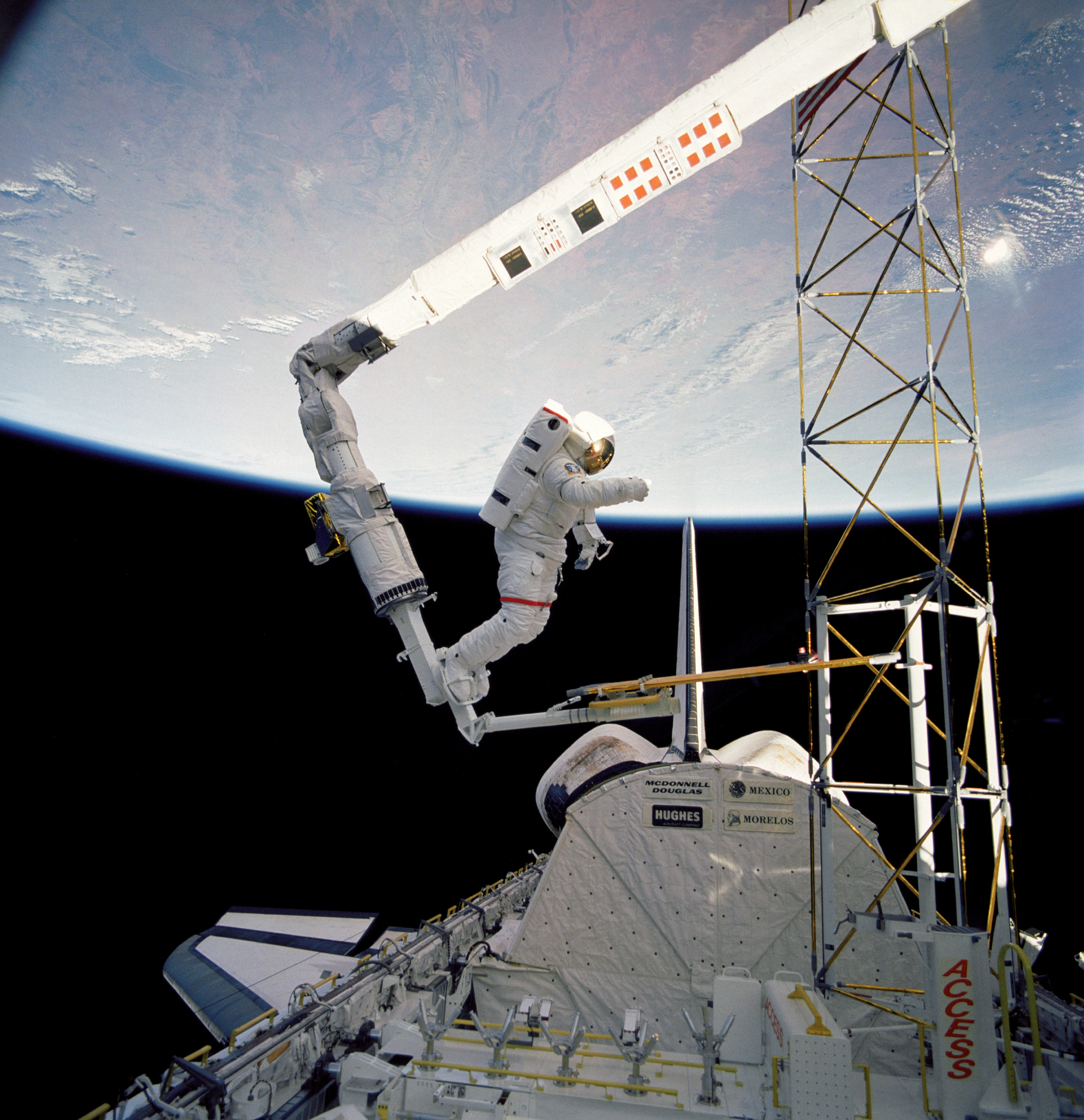
- Construction of the ACCESS structure.
- Names: Space Transportation System-23
- Mission type: Satellites deployment Technology
- Operator: NASA
- COSPAR ID: 1985-109A
- SATCAT no.: 16273
- Mission duration: 6 days, 21 hours, 4 minutes, 49 seconds
- Distance travelled: 3,970,181 km (2,466,956 mi)
- Orbits completed: 109

Spacecraft properties
- Spacecraft: Space Shuttle Atlantis
- Launch mass: 118,664 kg (261,609 lb)
- Landing mass: 93,316 kg (205,727 lb)
- Payload mass: 21,791 kg (48,041 lb)

Crew
- Crew size: 7
- Members: Brewster H. Shaw Jr.; Bryan D. O'Connor; Jerry L. Ross; Mary L. Cleave; Sherwood C. Spring; Charles D. Walker; Rodolfo Neri Vela
- EVAs: 2
- EVA duration: 12 hours, 13 minutes; 1st EVA: 5 hours, 32 minutes; 2nd EVA: 6 hours, 41 minutes

Start of mission
- Launch date: November 27, 1985, 00:29:00 UTC (7:29 pm EST)
- Launch site: Kennedy, LC-39A
- Contractor: Rockwell International

End of mission
- Landing date: December 3, 1985, 21:33:49 UTC (1:33:49 pm PST)
- Landing site: Edwards, Runway 22

Orbital parameters
- Reference system: Geocentric orbit
- Regime: Low Earth orbit
- Perigee altitude: 361 km (224 mi)
- Apogee altitude: 370 km (230 mi)
- Inclination: 28.45°
- Period: 91.90 minutes

Instruments
- Assembly Concept for Construction of Erectable Space Structures (ACCESS); Continuous Flow Electrophoresis System (CFES); Diffusive Mixing of Organic Solutions (DMOS); Experimental Assembly of Structures in EVA (EASE); Getaway Special (GAS) canister; Morelos Payload Specialist Experiments (MPSE); Orbiter Experiments (OEX)
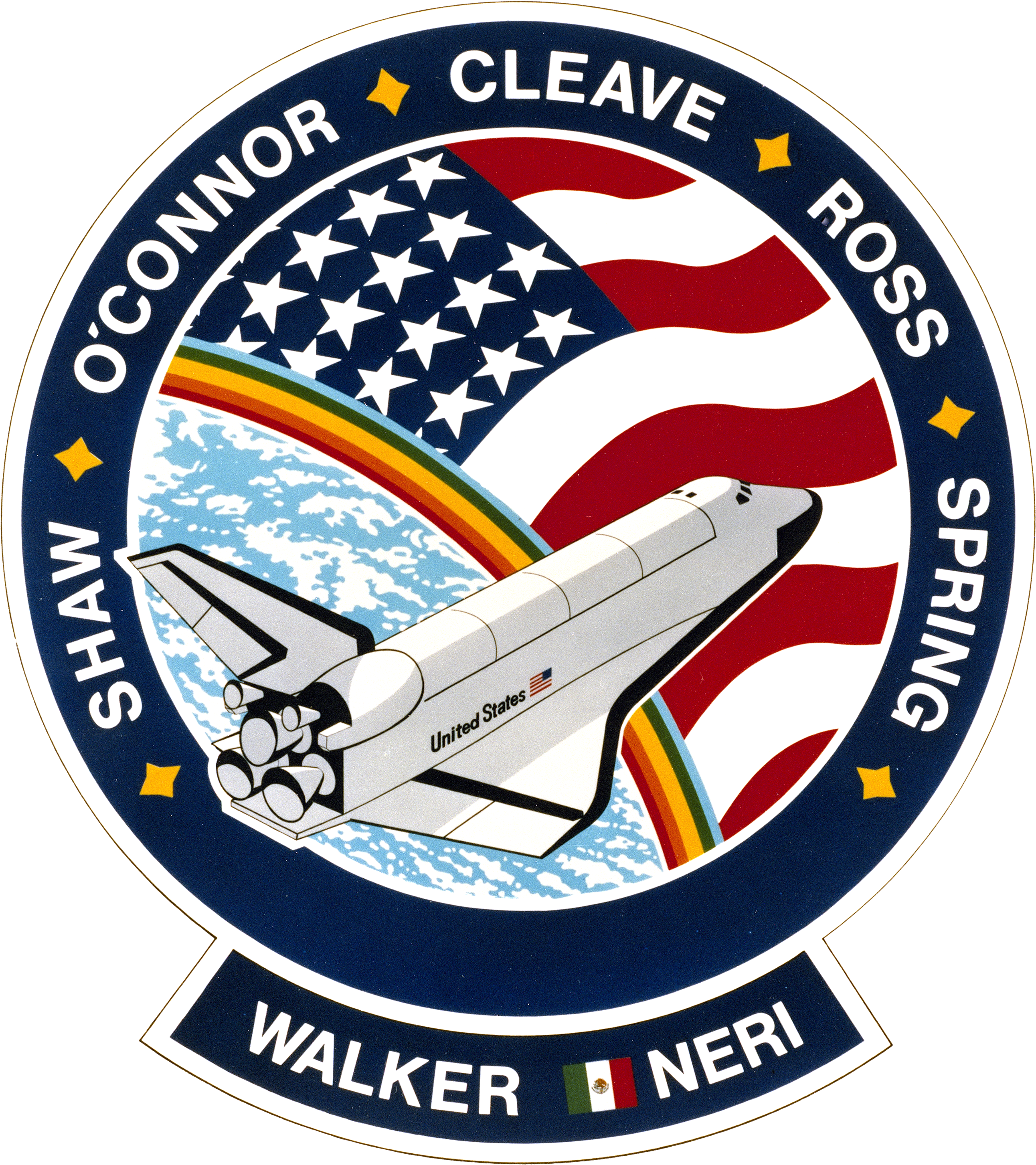
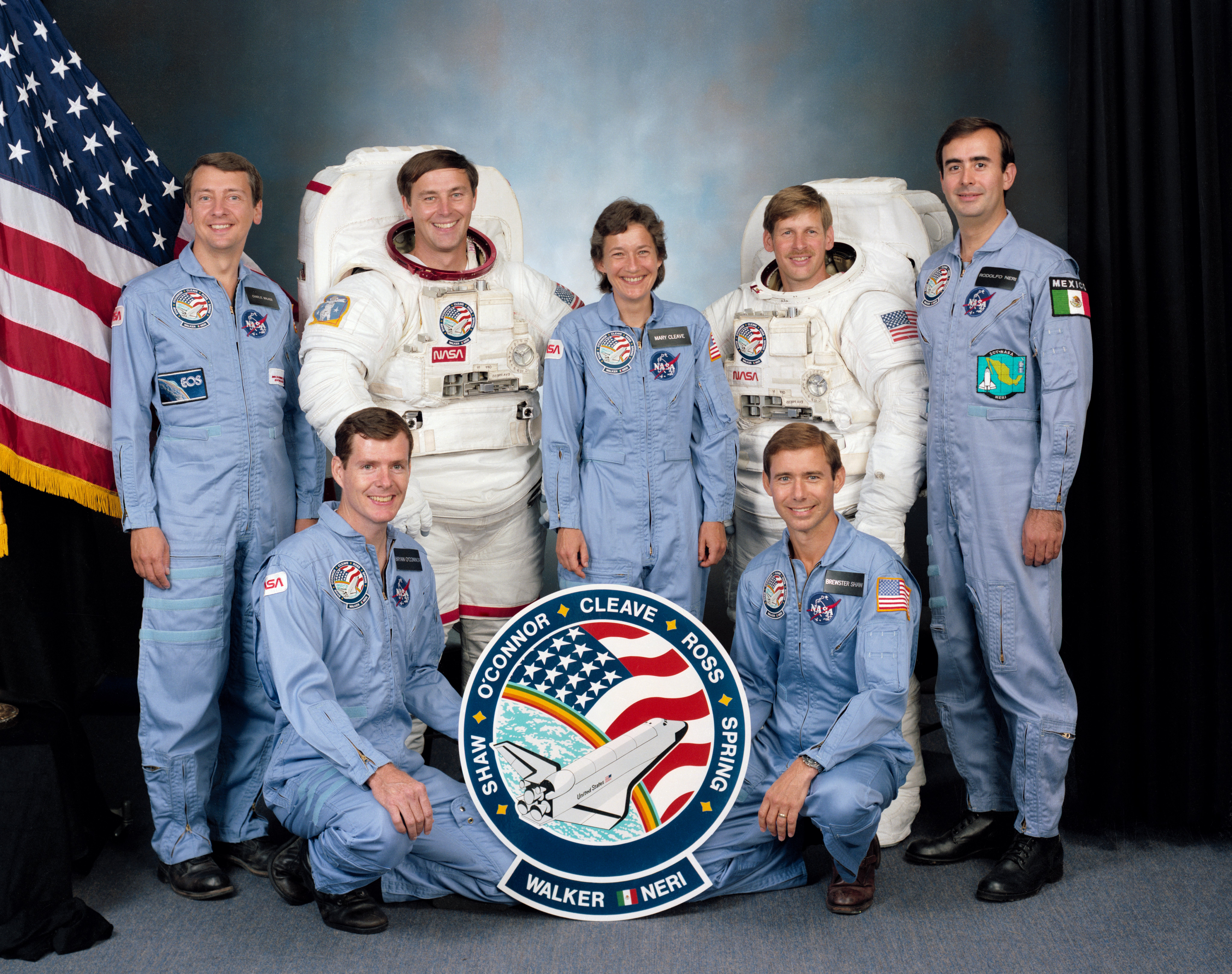
- STS-61-B mission patch Back row: Walker, Ross, Cleave, Spring and Neri Vela; Front row: O'Connor and Shaw Space Shuttle program

STS-61-B was the 23rd NASA Space Shuttle mission, and its second using Space Shuttle Atlantis. The shuttle was launched from Kennedy Space Center, Florida, on November 26, 1985. During STS-61-B, the shuttle crew deployed three communications satellites, and tested techniques of constructing structures in orbit. Atlantis landed at Edwards Air Force Base, California, at 16:33:49 EST on December 3, 1985, after 6 days, 21 hours, 4 minutes, and 49 seconds in orbit.

STS-61-B marked the quickest turnaround of a Shuttle orbiter from launch to launch in history – just 54 days elapsed between Atlantis' launch on STS-51-J and launch on STS-61-B. As of August 2022, this is still the record for turn around between two flights of the same orbital space vehicle. The mission was also notable for carrying the first Mexican astronaut, Rodolfo Neri Vela. This was also Atlantis' second and final mission before the Space Shuttle Challenger disaster in 1986. The Challenger disaster would ground the shuttle fleet for two and a half years and Atlantis would not fly again until STS-27, which launched three years later on December 2, 1988.

== Crew ==
| Position | Astronaut |
|---|---|
| Commander | (United States) Brewster H. Shaw Jr. Second spaceflight |
| Pilot | (United States) Bryan D. O'Connor; First spaceflight |
| Mission Specialist 1 | (United States) Jerry L. Ross; First spaceflight |
| Mission Specialist 2 Flight Engineer | (United States) Mary L. Cleave; First spaceflight |
| Mission Specialist 3 | (United States) Sherwood C. Spring; Only spaceflight |
| Payload Specialist 1 | (United States) Charles D. Walker; Third and last spaceflight McDonnell Douglas |
| Payload Specialist 2 | (Mexico) Rodolfo Neri Vela; Only spaceflight SCT |

=== Backup crew ===
| Position | Astronaut |
|---|---|
| Payload Specialist 1 | (United States) Robert J. Wood; McDonnell Douglas |
| Payload Specialist 2 | (Mexico) Ricardo Peralta y Fabi; SCT |

=== Crew seat assignments ===
| Seat | Launch | Landing | Seats 1–4 are on the flight deck. Seats 5–7 are on the mid-deck. |
| 1 | Shaw | | Seats 1–4 are on the flight deck. Seats 5–7 are on the mid-deck. |
| 2 | O'Connor | | Seats 1–4 are on the flight deck. Seats 5–7 are on the mid-deck. |
| 3 | Ross | Spring | Seats 1–4 are on the flight deck. Seats 5–7 are on the mid-deck. |
| 4 | Cleave | | Seats 1–4 are on the flight deck. Seats 5–7 are on the mid-deck. |
| 5 | Spring | Ross | Seats 1–4 are on the flight deck. Seats 5–7 are on the mid-deck. |
| 6 | Walker | | Seats 1–4 are on the flight deck. Seats 5–7 are on the mid-deck. |
| 7 | Neri Vela | | Seats 1–4 are on the flight deck. Seats 5–7 are on the mid-deck. |

== Shuttle processing ==
After landing at the Edwards Air Force Base at the end of STS-51-J on October 7, 1985, Atlantis returned to the Kennedy Space Center on October 12, 1985. The shuttle was moved directly into an Orbiter Processing Facility (OPF), where post-flight de-servicing and pre-flight processing took place simultaneously.

After only 26 days in the OPF, a record fast processing in the history of the Space Shuttle program, the shuttle was rolled to the Vehicle Assembly Building (VAB) on November 7, 1985. Atlantis was mated with the External Tank (ET) and Solid Rocket Booster (SRB) stack and was rolled out to launch LC-39A on November 12, 1985.

== Payload ==
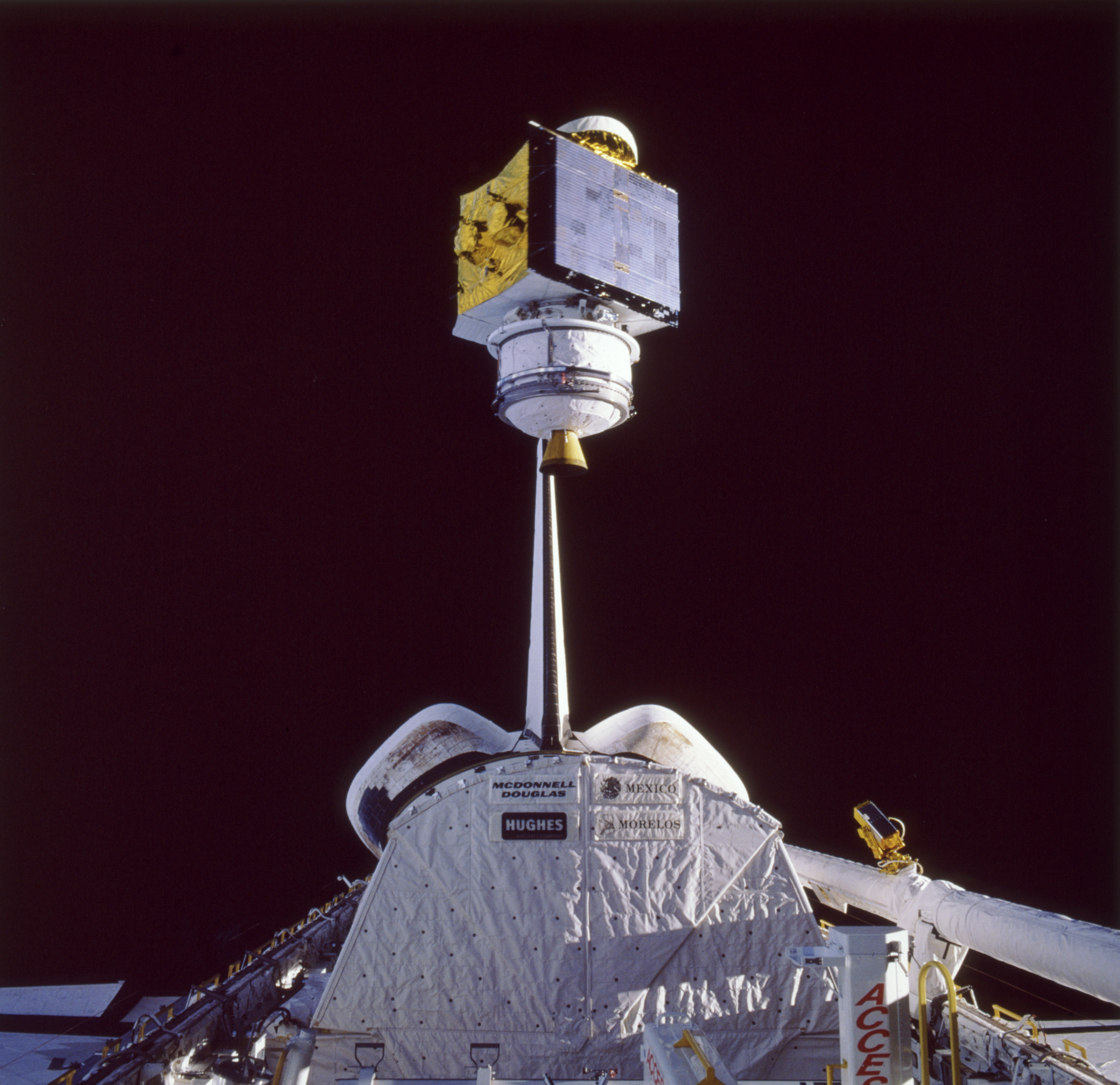
Deployment of the Satcom-K2 satellite

Three satellites were deployed during this mission: Aussat-2, Morelos-2, and Satcom-K2. Aussat-2 and Morelos-2 were the second satellites in their series (the first satellites in the series were deployed during STS-51-G and STS-51-I). Both of these were Hughes Space and Communications HS-376 satellites and were equipped with a Payload Assist Module (PAM-D) booster to reach geostationary transfer orbit (GTO). Satcom-K2 was a version of the RCA 4000 series satellites, which were owned and operated by RCA American Communications (RCA). This satellite was deployed using a PAM-D2 booster (which was a larger version of the PAM-D). This was the first flight of the PAM-D2 booster on a Space Shuttle.

All three satellites were successfully deployed, one at a time, and their booster stages fired automatically to lift them to geostationary transfer orbits. Their respective owners assumed charge, and later fired the onboard kick motors at apogee, to circularize the orbits and align them with the equator.

=== Middeck payloads ===
- Continuous Flow Electrophoresis System (CFES)
- Diffusive Mixing of Organic Solutions (DMOS)
- Morelos Payload Specialist Experiments (MPSE) and Orbiter Experiments (OEX)

=== Other items ===
A checkered racing flag was carried on board Atlantis during STS-61-B; the flag is now on display at the Indianapolis Motor Speedway Hall of Fame Museum. This was also the second test flight of the Orbiter Experiments (OEX) advanced autopilot. It ran for approximately 65 hours and demonstrated the ability to fly the orbiter on nose jets only, aft jets only, to automatically stationkeep on another satellite and to fly an orbit with zero aerodynamic drag. The OEX autopilot was also more fuel efficient than the baseline system.

== Mission summary ==
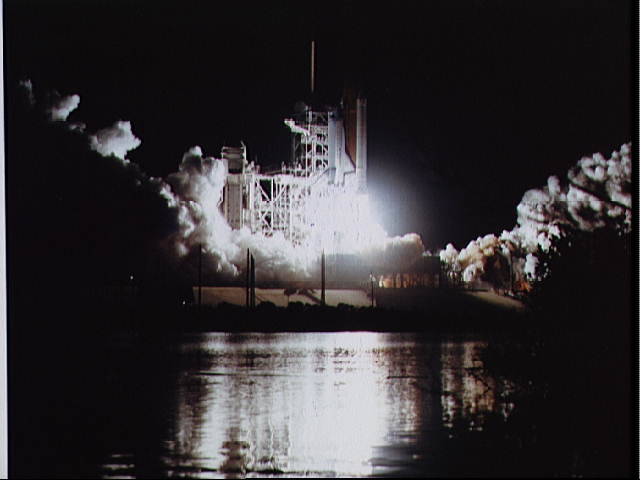
Night launch of Atlantis at the beginning of the STS-61-B mission

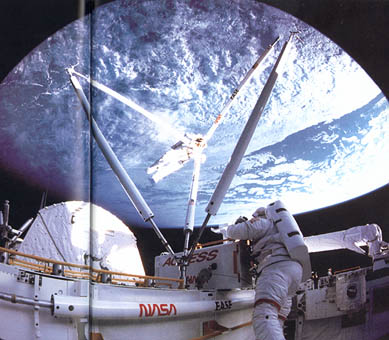
Construction of the EASE structure

Space Shuttle Atlantis lifted off from Launch Complex 39A at Kennedy Space Center at 19:29:00 p.m. EST on November 26, 1985. The launch marked the second night launch of the Space Shuttle program, and the ninth and final flight of 1985.

A key element of the mission's objectives was EASE/ACCESS, an experiment in assembling large structures in space. EASE/ACCESS was a joint venture between the Langley Research Center (LRC) and the Marshall Space Flight Center (MSFC). ACCESS was a "high-rise" tower composed of many small struts and nodes. EASE was a geometric structure shaped like an inverted pyramid, that was composed of a few large beams and nodes. Together, these experiments demonstrated the feasibility of assembling large preformed structures in space. Astronauts Ross and Spring performed two spacewalks on the mission, which marked the 50th, and 51st extravehicular activity (EVAs) for the United States, and the 12th and the 13th for the Shuttle program. An IMAX camera mounted in the cargo bay filmed the activities of the astronauts engaged in the EASE/ACCESS work, as well as other scenes of interest.

"This is probably not the preferred way of building a space station", Ross said later of EASE. The astronauts reported that the most difficult part of the spacewalks was torquing their own masses while holding the EASE beams. They found that ACCESS worked well, while EASE required too much free floating. The astronauts judged that performing six-hour spacewalks every other day over a five or six-day period was feasible, and recommended glove changes to reduce hand fatigue. Ross said in the EVA debrief that the crew had tried to have the Manned Maneuvering Unit (MMU) manifested for use in the second spacewalk, because "for certain applications it would be very useful. In particular if you were building portions of a space station attached to the orbiter, then moving those portions farther than the manipulator arm could transport them". He added that the MMU could be used to attach cable runs and instruments in places that were out of reach of the shuttle's robotic arm (Canadarm).

During the mission astronaut Rodolfo Neri Vela accomplished a series of experiments, that were primarily related to human physiology. He also photographed Mexico and Mexico City as part of the mission's Earth observations. However, Commander Brewster Shaw installed a padlock on the hatch control because he was "particularly concerned" that the Mexican could "flip out" during the mission. Shaw had noted that he didn't think that Neri Vela noticed the padlock, but that the other members of the crew did. Astronaut Charles Walker again operated the Continuous Flow Electrophoresis System (CFES), the third flight of this larger and improved equipment, to produce commercial pharmaceutical products in microgravity. An experiment in Diffusive Mixing of Organic Solutions (DMOS), was conducted successfully for 3M. The object of this experiment was to grow single crystals that were larger and more pure than any that could be grown on Earth. One Getaway Special (GAS) canister stored in Atlantis's payload bay carried a Canadian student experiment, which involved the fabrication of mirrors in microgravity with higher performance than ones made on Earth.

All the experiments on this mission were successfully accomplished, and all equipment operated within established parameters. Atlantis landed safely at Edwards Air Force Base at 16:33:49 EST on December 3, 1985, after a mission lasting 6 days, 21 hours, 4 minutes, 49 seconds. Atlantis landed one orbit earlier than planned due to lighting concerns at the Edwards. Rollout distance on landing was 3,279 m (10,758 ft) lasting 78 seconds.

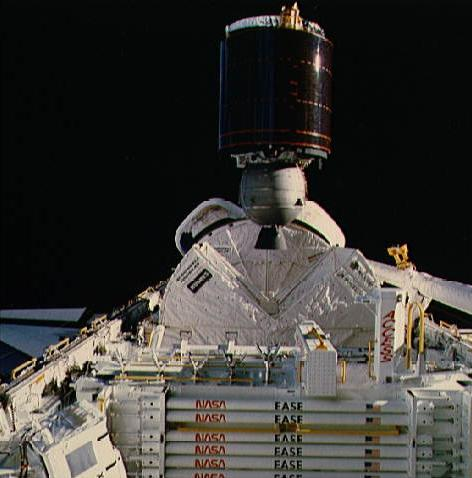
Deployment of the Morelos-2 satellite

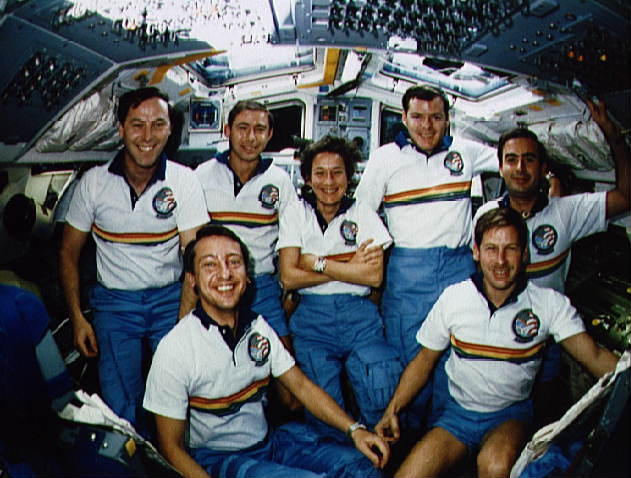
STS-61-B crew portrait in-flight on the aft flight deck

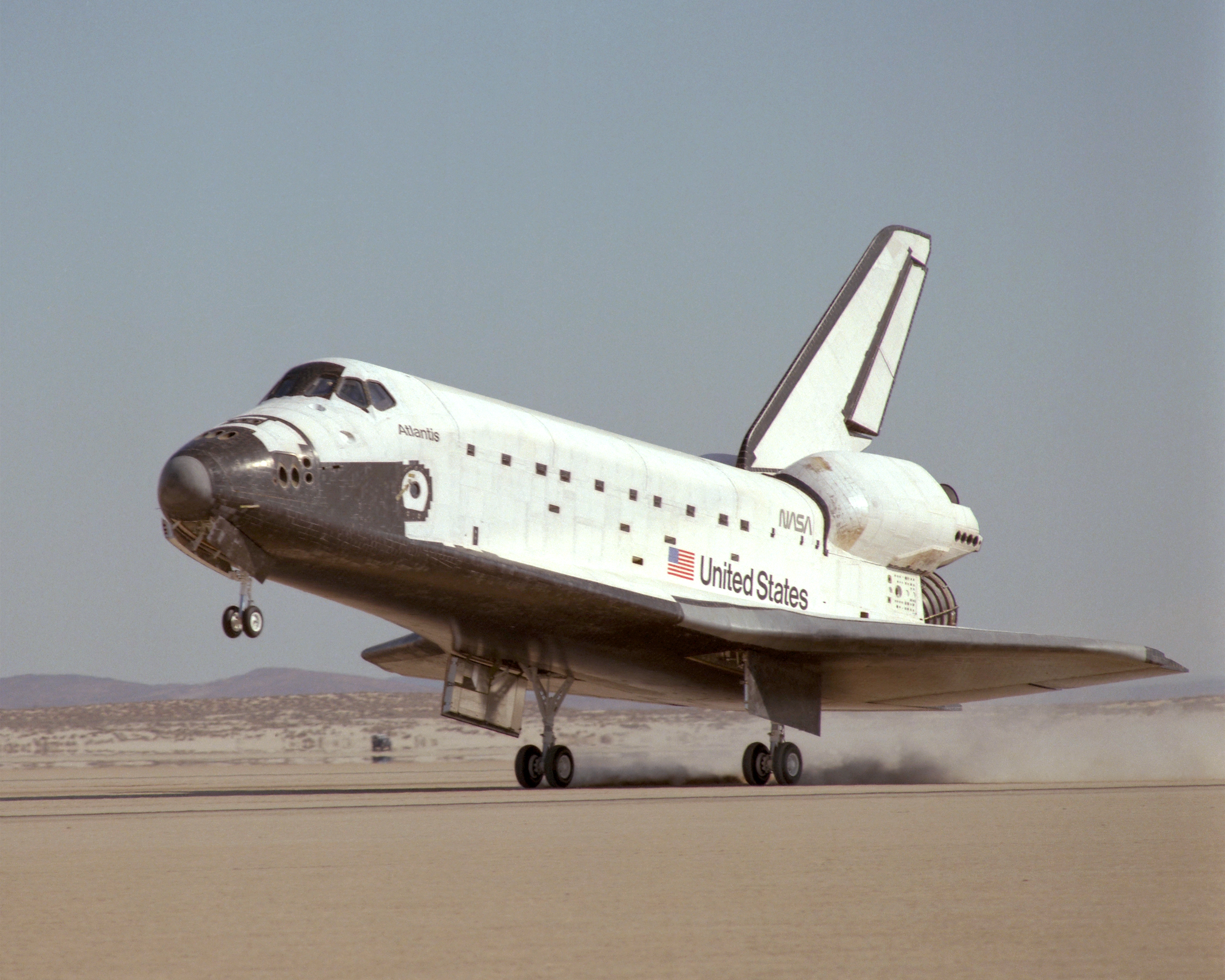
Atlantis touches down at the lakebed runway at Edwards Air Force Base. This is its previous flight, STS-51J. STS-61B landed on concrete runway 22.

== Spacewalks ==
Two spacewalks were conducted during the STS-61-B mission to demonstrate assembly techniques which might be used in space station assembly.

| EVA | Spacewalkers | Start (UTC) | End (UTC) | Duration |
|---|---|---|---|---|
| 1 | Jerry L. Ross; Sherwood C. Spring | November 29, 1985, 24:42 | November 30, 1985, 03:17 | 5 hours, 32 minutes |
| 1 | EVA 1 focused on human performance during assembling of an experimental erectable truss structure. Ross and Spring first assembled the 3.4 m (11 ft) Assembly Concept for Construction of Erectable Space Structures (ACCESS) assembly jig in Atlantis' payload bay. Each cell was assembled in the jig, then pushed up so that the next cell could be assembled. The astronauts assembled the ACCESS truss in 55 minutes, (EVA time line allotted two hours for a single ACCESS assembly) so they assembled it and built it again. The Experimental Assembly of Structures through EVA (EASE) task involved putting together beams weighing 29 kg (64 lb) to make a 3.6 m (12 ft) three-sided pyramid assessed the capabilities of free-floating astronauts. EASE was scheduled to be assembled six times, but Ross and Spring managed eight assemblies. During the first four assemblies the astronauts used foot restraints. In his post flight debriefing, Spring noted that his fingers grew numb during the third EASE assembly and very tired during the fourth. At the end of the EVA Spring assembled and hand-deployed a small target satellite to be used after the EVA as a station-keeping target for Atlantis, which played the role of an automated orbital maneuvering vehicle in rendezvous software tests. | | | |
| 2 | Jerry L. Ross; Sherwood C. Spring | December 1, 1985, ≈20:30 | December 2, 1985, ≈03:10 | 6 hours, 41 minutes |
| 2 | The purpose of EVA 2 was to assess the ability of astronauts to handle large structural elements and the ability of the Shuttle's robotic arm (Canadarm), to support future station assembly. Ross and Spring assembled nine bays of ACCESS, then placed parts for the tenth bay on the Canadarm. Ross stepped into the Manipulator Foot Restraint (MFR) and astronaut Mary C. Cleave positioned him within reach of the top of the ACCESS girder, where he assembled the tenth bay. The parts were not tethered. Ross performed a cable run assembly simulation by attaching a tether along the side of the tower while Cleave positioned him. Then Spring released the bottom of the tower so Ross could try to precisely handle the beam from the RMS. He replaced it in the assembly jig where it started, demonstrating astronaut ability to assemble a truss in one place and install it in another. Spring then replaced Ross on the MFR. He changed a beam on the tower to simulate structural repair, then pointed the truss at the Moon to judge his handling ability. The astronauts took down ACCESS, and Spring assembled EASE from the RMS. Before finishing, he joined two beams to simulate handling a thermal control heat pipe. Ross unlatched the EASE pyramid so that Spring could maneuver it. Then he replaced Spring on the MFR to duplicate the EASE activities. | | | |

== Wake-up calls ==
NASA began a tradition of playing music to astronauts during the Project Gemini, and first used music to wake up a flight crew during Apollo 15. Each track is specially chosen, often by the astronauts' families, and usually has a special meaning to an individual member of the crew, or is applicable to their daily activities.

| Flight Day | Song | Artist/Composer | Played for |
|---|---|---|---|
| Day 2 | "Air Force Hymn" | Mary Christian Dundas Hamilton | Brewster H. Shaw Jr. |
| Day 3 | "America the Beautiful" | Katharine Lee Bates and Samuel A. Ward | |
| Day 4 | "Marine Corps Hymn" | | Bryan O'Connor |
| Day 5 | "Notre Dame Victory March" | Michael and John Shea | Jerry L. Ross |
| Day 6 | "Born in the U.S.A." | Bruce Springsteen | |

== See also ==
- List of human spaceflights
- List of Space Shuttle missions
