= Rodolfo Neri Vela =

Mexican scientist and astronaut (born 1952)

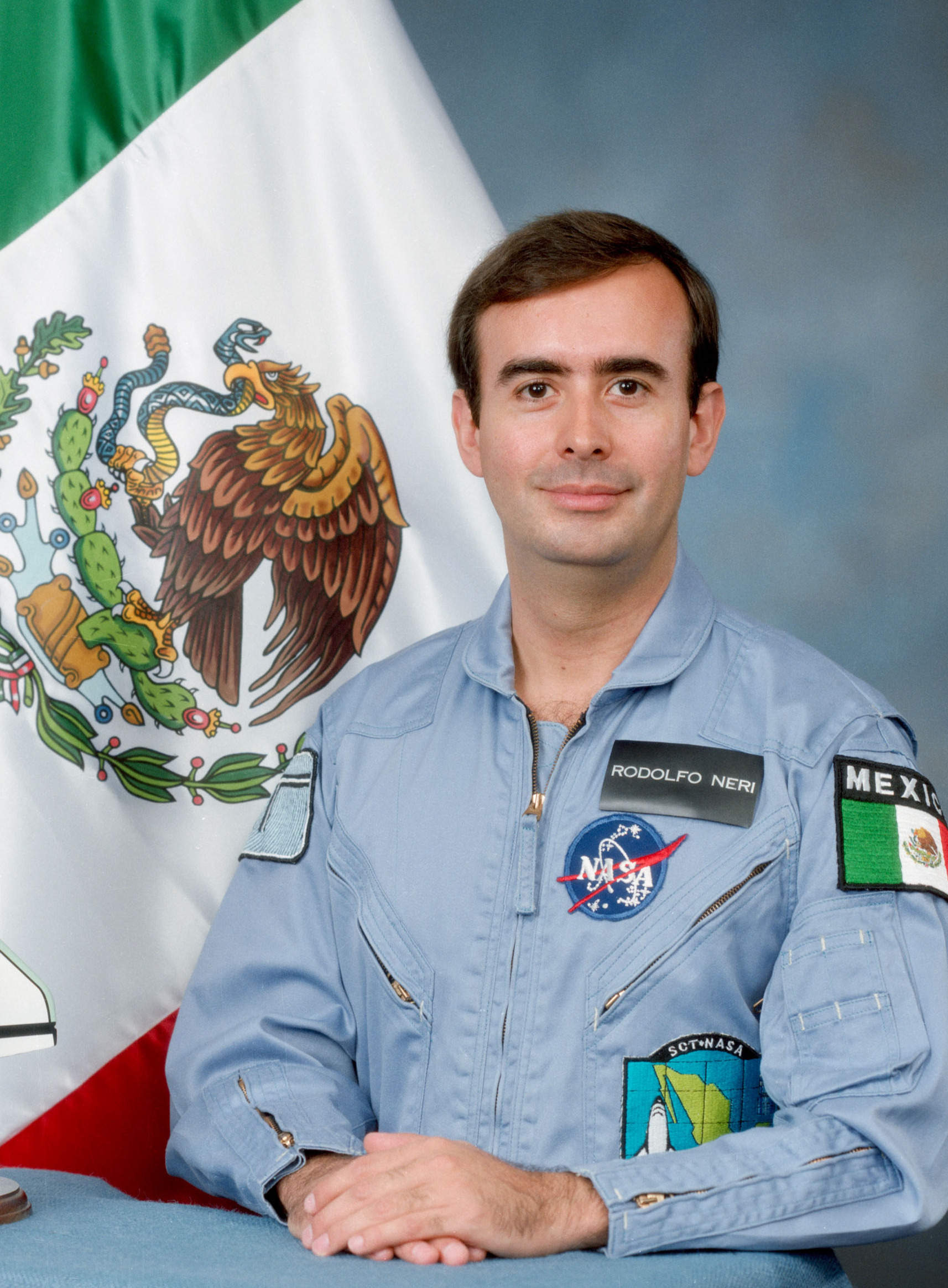
- Born: February 19, 1952 (age 74); Chilpancingo, Guerrero, Mexico
- Education: National Autonomous University of Mexico (BS); University of Essex (MS); University of Birmingham (PhD)
- Occupation: Engineer
- Space career

NASA Payload Specialist
- Time in space: 6d 21h 04m
- Selection: 1985 NASA Group
- Mission: STS-61-B

Rodolfo Neri Vela (born 19 February 1952) is a Mexican scientist and astronaut who flew aboard a NASA Space Shuttle mission in the year 1985. He is the second Latin American to have travelled to space after Cuban cosmonaut Arnaldo Tamayo Méndez and the first Mexican astronaut.

== Personal ==
Neri was born in Chilpancingo, Guerrero, Mexico. He is a professor in the Telecommunications Department in the Electrical Engineering Division of the Engineering Faculty at the National Autonomous University of Mexico (UNAM). He is of Native American, Spanish and Italian ancestry.

== Education ==
Neri was a High School student at Escuela Nacional Preparatoria 2. Neri received a bachelor's degree in mechanical and electrical engineering, National Autonomous University of Mexico (UNAM) 1975, and received a master's degree in science, specialized in telecommunications systems, in 1976 from the University of Essex, England. Neri then received a doctorate degree in electromagnetic radiation from the University of Birmingham in 1979 and performed one year of postdoctoral research in waveguides at the University of Birmingham.

== Career ==
Neri has worked in the Institute of Electrical and Electronics Engineers, United States; The Institution of Electrical Engineers, UK; Asociación Mexicana de Ingenieros en Comunicaciones Eléctricas y Electrónicas, Mexico; and Colegio de Ingenieros Mecánicos y Electricistas, Mexico.

Neri has also worked at the Institute of Electrical Research, Mexico, in the Radio Communications Group, doing research and system planning on antenna theory and design, satellite communications systems, and Earth station technology.

He is currently also a full-time researcher at the Electric Engineering department of the Faculty of Engineering at UNAM.

In 2016, he had a participation in the Latin American dubbing of the film Finding Dory as the narrator of the recording of the Institute of Marine Life.

== Spaceflight ==
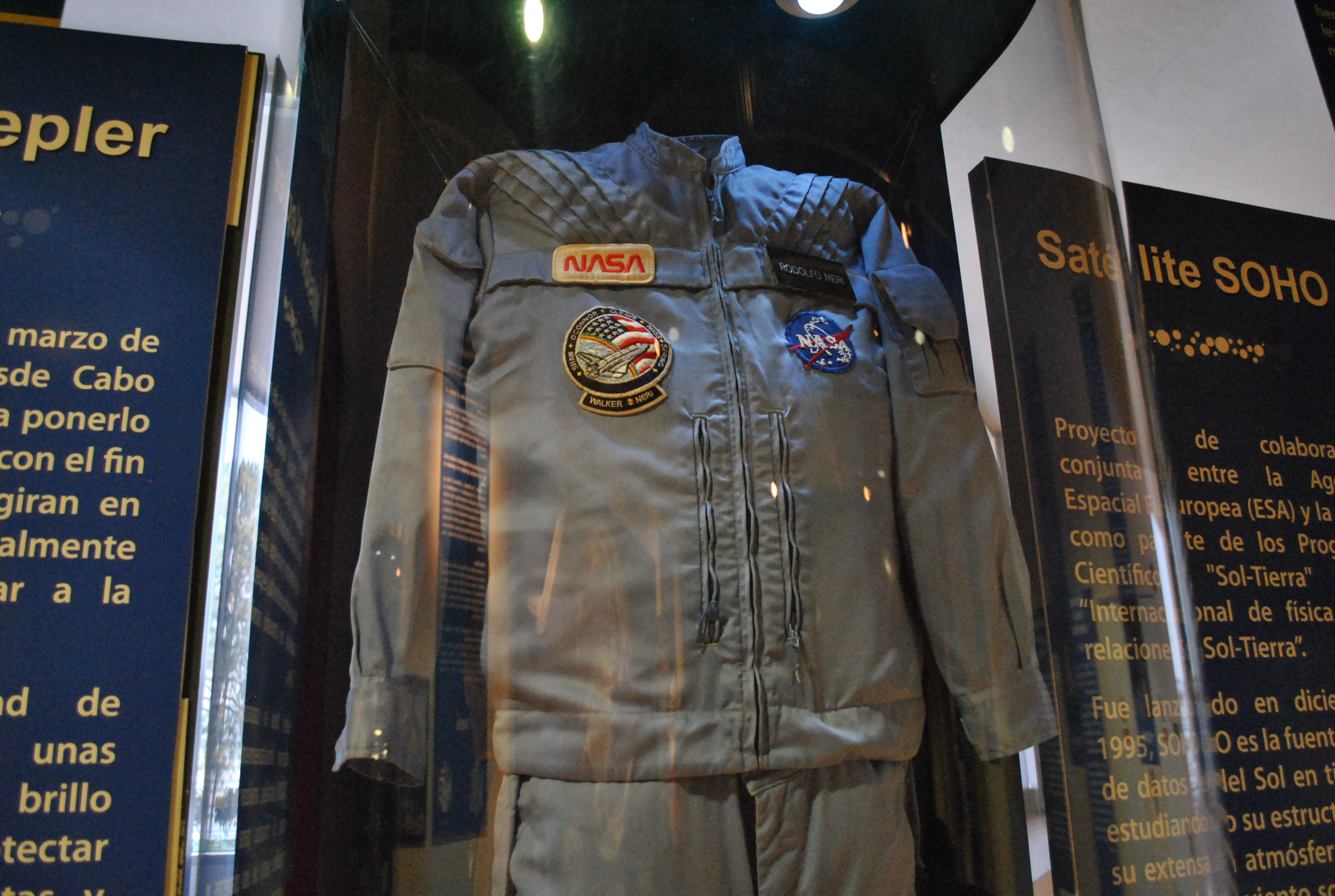
Neri Vela's flight suit in the Museum of Technology in Mexico City.

Neri was a Payload Specialist aboard the STS-61-B Atlantis mission, from 26 November to 3 December 1985. STS-61B launched at night from Kennedy Space Center, Florida, and returned to land at Edwards Air Force Base, California. During the mission the crew deployed the MORELOS-B, AUSSATT II, and SATCOM K-2 communications satellites, conducted two six-hour spacewalks to demonstrate space station construction techniques with the EASE/ACCESS experiments, operated the Continuous Flow Electrophoresis (CRFES) experiment for McDonnell Douglas and a Getaway Special (GAS) container for Telesat, Canada, conducted several Mexican Payload Specialists Experiments for the Mexican government, and tested the Orbiter Experiments Digital Autopilot (OEX DAP).

At mission conclusion, Neri had travelled 2.4 million miles (3.8 million km) in 108 Earth orbits, and logged over 165 hours in space.

Neri requested tortillas in his food supply on the flight. Subsequently, NASA began including tortillas on shuttle and ISS missions, since tortillas, unlike regular bread, did not create crumbs and could be used to make sandwiches or hold other food items. Since then, tortillas have been a favourite of astronauts and are standard fare aboard ISS. Crewmembers use them to make breakfast burritos, hamburgers, and even peanut butter and jelly sandwiches.

== See also ==
- List of Hispanic astronauts

== Bibliography ==
- Neri Vela, Rodolfo; Kuri, Ramón Soberón (1984). El ingeniero en electricidad y electrónica, qué hace? (in Spanish). México, D.F.: Alhambra Mexicana. ISBN 978-968-444-035-7. OCLC 21308198.
- Neri Vela, Rodolfo; Elizondo, Carlos (1986). El planeta azul : Misión 61-B (in Spanish). México, D.F.: EDAMEX. ISBN 978-968-409-328-7. OCLC 15155985.
- Neri Vela, Rodolfo; Jorge L Ruiz G (1987). El pequeño astronauta (in Spanish). México, D.F.: Consejo Nacional de Ciencia y Tecnología. ISBN 978-968-823-197-5. OCLC 19739242.
- Neri Vela, Rodolfo (1989). La exploración y uso del espacio (in Spanish). Mexico, D.F.: Consejo Nacional de Ciencia y Tecnología. ISBN 978-968-823-103-6. OCLC 24257788.
- Neri Vela, Rodolfo; Avalos, Bernardo Martinez (1990). Construya e instale su propia antena parabolica (in Spanish). Mexico, D.F.: Consejo Nacional de Ciencia y Tecnología. ISBN 978-968-823-168-5. OCLC 24494639.
- Neri Vela, Rodolfo (1991). Los eclipses y el movimiento del universo (in Spanish). México: Grupo Editorial Iberoamérica. ISBN 978-968-7270-76-0. OCLC 25668587.
- Neri Vela, Rodolfo (1992). Vuelta al mundo en noventa minutos (in Spanish). México: Atlántida. ISBN 968-6868-00-3. OCLC 30537012.
- Neri Vela, Rodolfo (1999). Líneas de transmisión (in Spanish). México: McGraw-Hill. ISBN 978-970-10-2546-8. OCLC 45878412.
- Neri Vela, Rodolfo (2003). Comunicaciones por satélite (in Spanish). México: Thomson. ISBN 978-970-686-282-2. OCLC 55022508.
