= Salakot =

Traditional wide-brimmed hat from the Philippines

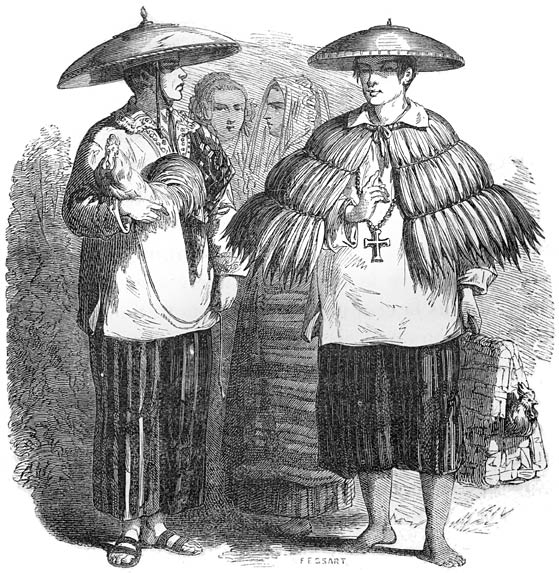
Tagalog men in traditional barong tagalog, vestido de anajao (palm leaf rain capes), and salakot, c. 1855

Salakot is a traditional lightweight headgear from the Philippines commonly used for protection against the sun and rain. Variants occur among ethnic groups, but all are shaped like a dome or cone and can range in size from having very wide brims to being almost helmet-like. Made from various materials including bamboo, rattan, nito ferns, and bottle gourd, the salakot is held in place by an inner headband and a chinstrap. The tip of the crown commonly has a spiked or knobbed finial made of metal or wood. The salakot is the direct precursor to the pith helmet (also called salacot in Spanish and salacco in French) widely used by European military forces in the colonial era.

== Description ==
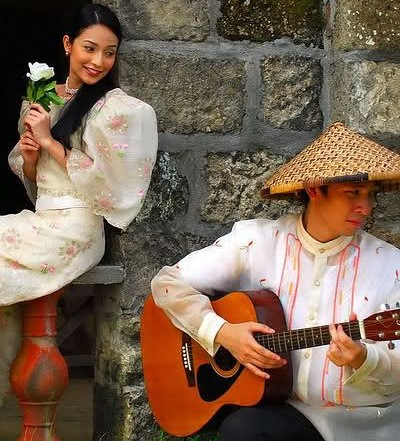
Salakot worn with a barong tagalog

Salakot is a general term for a range of related traditional headgear used by virtually all ethnic groups of the Philippines. It is usually dome-shaped or cone-shaped, but various other styles also exist, including versions with dome-shaped, cone-shaped, or flat crowns with a flat or gently sloping brim. The tip of the crown commonly has a spiked or knobbed finial made of metal or wood (sometimes with horsehair or feather plumes). The rim may also feature tassels of beads, feathers, or metal ornaments. They can range in size from having very wide brims to being almost helmet-like. It is held in place by an inner headband (baat) and a chinstrap. It was widely used in the Philippines until the 20th century when it was largely replaced by western-style hats.

Salakot can be made from various materials including bamboo, rattan, nito, bottle gourd, buri straw, nipa leaves, pandan leaves, carabao horn, and tortoiseshell. The way they are manufactured and ornamented varies by ethnic group. Salakot can also have named subtypes based on the material used. Among Tagalogs for example, salakot made from split bamboo were known as tinipas, while salakot made from dried bottle gourd were known as takukom. They can also be coated with resin to make them waterproof.

Most salakot were simple and were made from cheap materials. These were worn as protection against the sun and rain by farmers and fishermen. More elaborate ones, made from rarer materials with inlaid ornaments and tassels, were treated as precious heirloom objects, handed down from generation to generation. They were status symbols and could be used as currency, as collateral for a promise, or as gifts.

Some salakot also had cloth overlays (which are commonly decorated with elaborate embroidery) or have linings which can have pockets used for storing valuables and money, as well as tobacco or betel leaves.

== Variants ==
The name salakot is derived from the version of the headgear from the Tagalog and Kapampangan people. The names of similar headgear in other ethnic groups of the Philippines include:

- Talugong – salakot of the Ivatan people. It is worn by men paired with a vest of voyavoy palm leaves called kana-i or kanayi. Women, in turn, wear a straw cowl called a vakul.
- Hallidung – also known as lido, are the salakot of the Ifugao people. Usually made from twilled rattan or bamboo and covered in a coating of resin to make it waterproof.
- Kalugung – are the salakot of the Ilocano people and Kalinga people. They were usually made of rattan and nito, or from light wood. They were either shaped like a dome or a gently sloping cone.
- Kattukong – also known as katukong, tukong, or tabungaw, are the salakot of the Ilocano and Tinguian people, usually made from dried gourd reinforced with nito woven at the rim.
- Sadók or Sarók – refers to the different salakot designs of the Visayan, Bikolano, and Mandaya people.

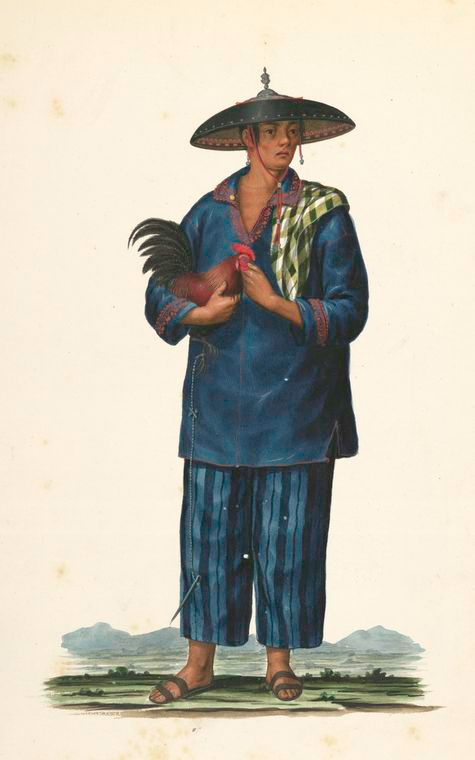
A Tagalog man with a salakot and a cockfighting rooster, from Tipos del País (1841) by Justiniano Asuncion

- Visayan Sarók – Also known as takokong in Sialo-dialect Cebuano. Features a lightweight and ornamented design. It is made of woven stalks from the nito plant (Lygodium spp.) and/or dried leaves or bamboo, creating a patterned net-like structure, with a signature six-petal flower design made from lighter leaves or thin bamboo wood plates secured at the very top of the hat.
- Bicolano Sadók – This salakot is made from anahaw leaves and bamboo and either features a pointed shape resembling Mt Mayon, or a rounded shape with an inner attached hat fitted around the wearer's head. This is also the style of salakot worn in Leyte and Sorsogon.
- Mandaya Sadók – The Mandaya sadok is uniquely elongated from front to back, and are often decorated with feathers, tassels, and beads.

- Saro – are the salakot of the Tausug people
- Sarúk – are the salakot of the Yakan and Sama-Bajau people made from plaited rattan, nito and cotton. The Yakan version is characteristically dome-shaped with a wide crown. Both men and women can wear the saruk. Among men, they are worn over the traditional pis syabit headscarves.
- Sayap – are the salakot of the Maguindanao people. They are made from twilled bamboo, nito, or pandan leaves. They also known as binalano, tapisan, talakudong, or kudong. It is celebrated in the Talakudong Festival of Tacurong City (which is named after it).
- S'laong – are the salakot of T'boli people. They are gender-specific. Men wore the shallow conical s'laong naf, made from bamboo and rattan with geometric black-and-white designs. Women wore the wide-brimmed s'laong kinibang which was made from bamboo covered with a cloth lining that distinctively hang down the sides and back, usually decorated with bead fringes.
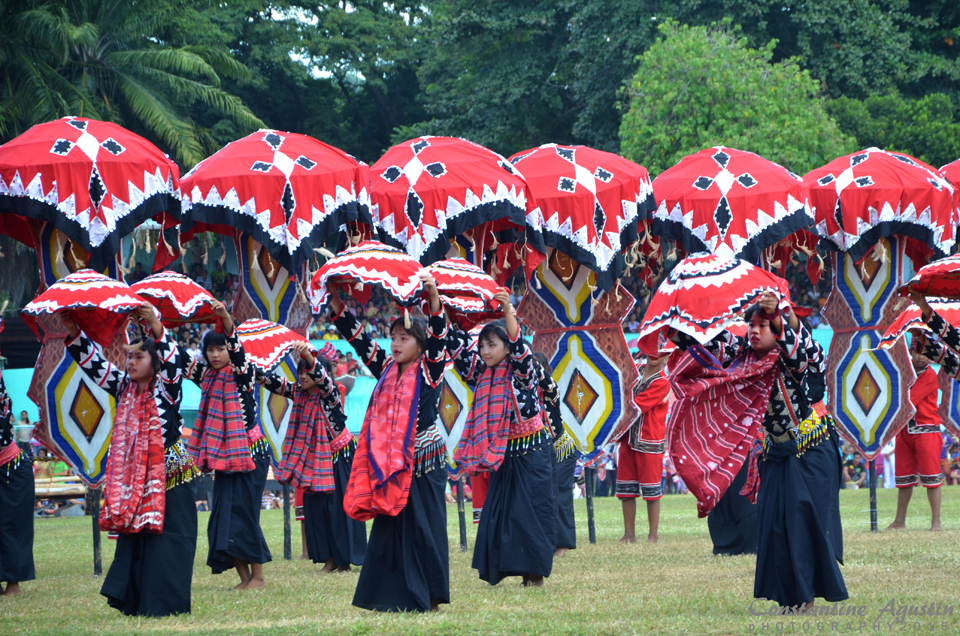
The cloth-covered s'laong kinibang of T'boli women

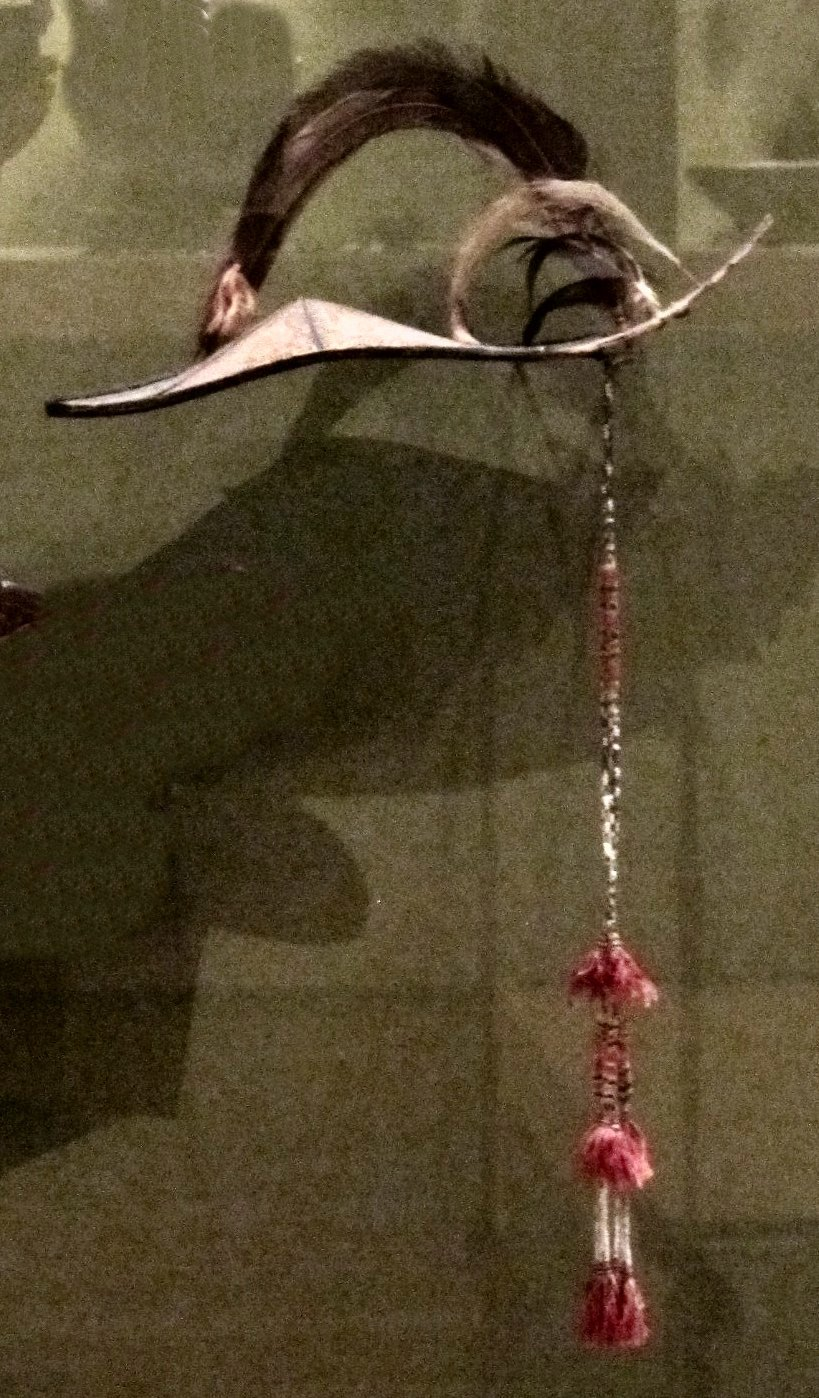
The uniquely shaped sadok of the Mandaya people of southeastern Mindanao

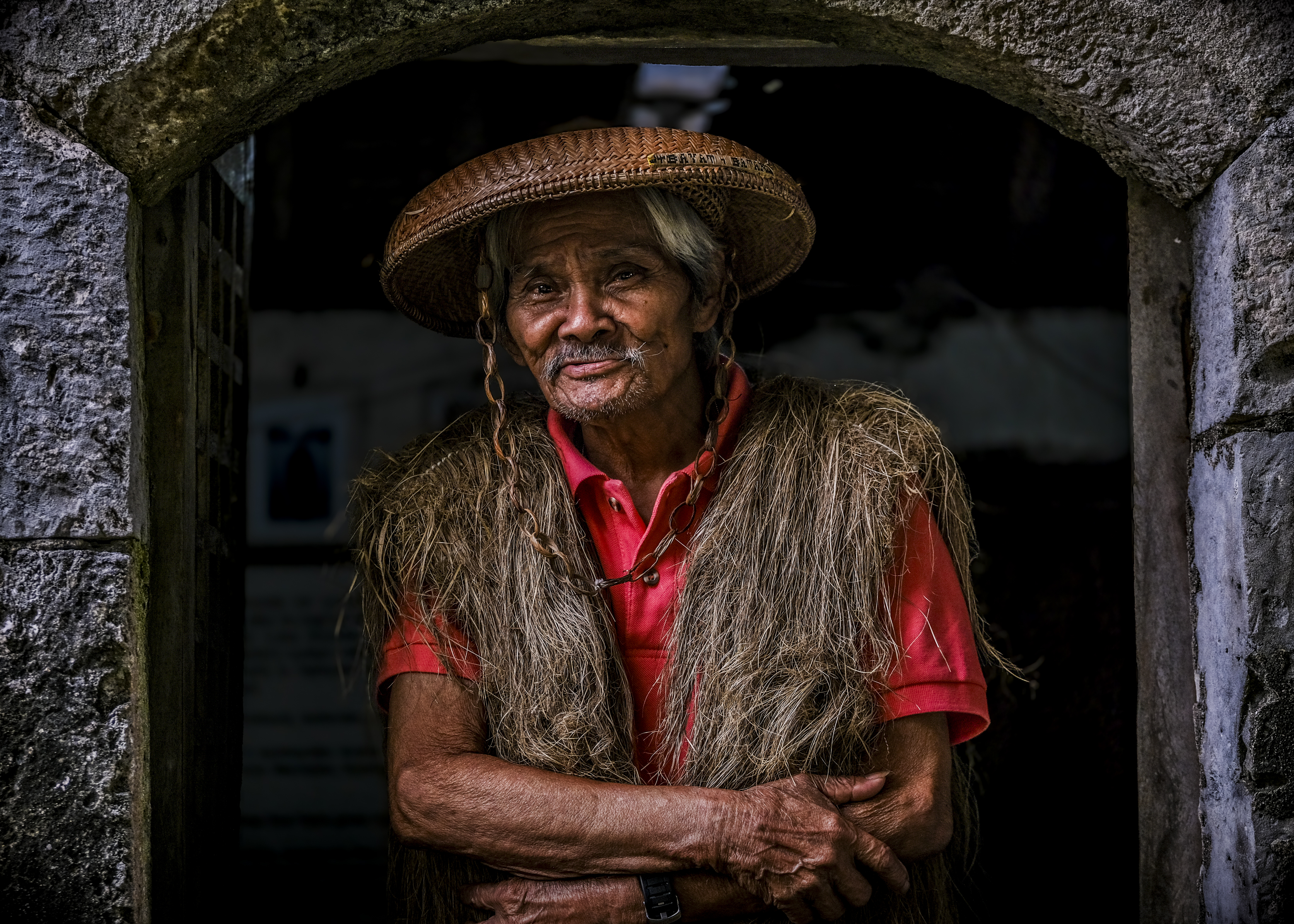
Ivatan man wearing the talugong with a kanay-i vest

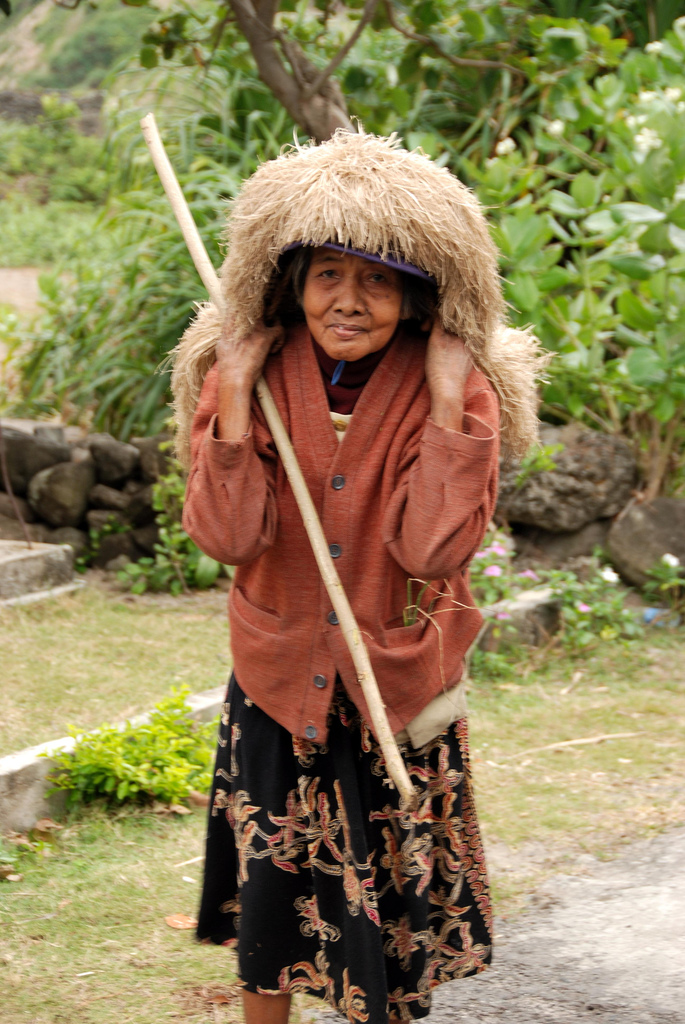
Ivatan woman wearing the vakul

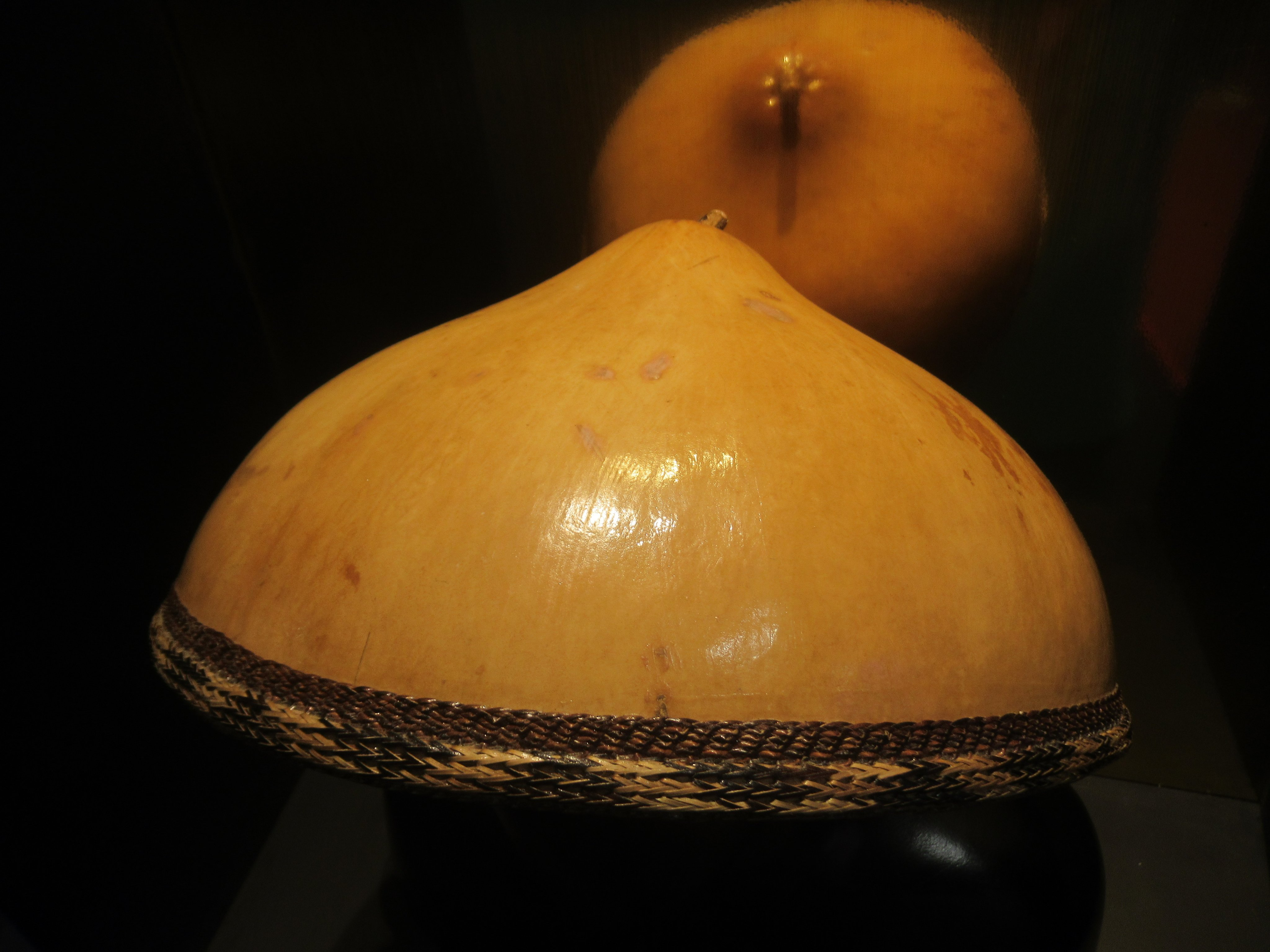
Ilocano kattukong gourd hat

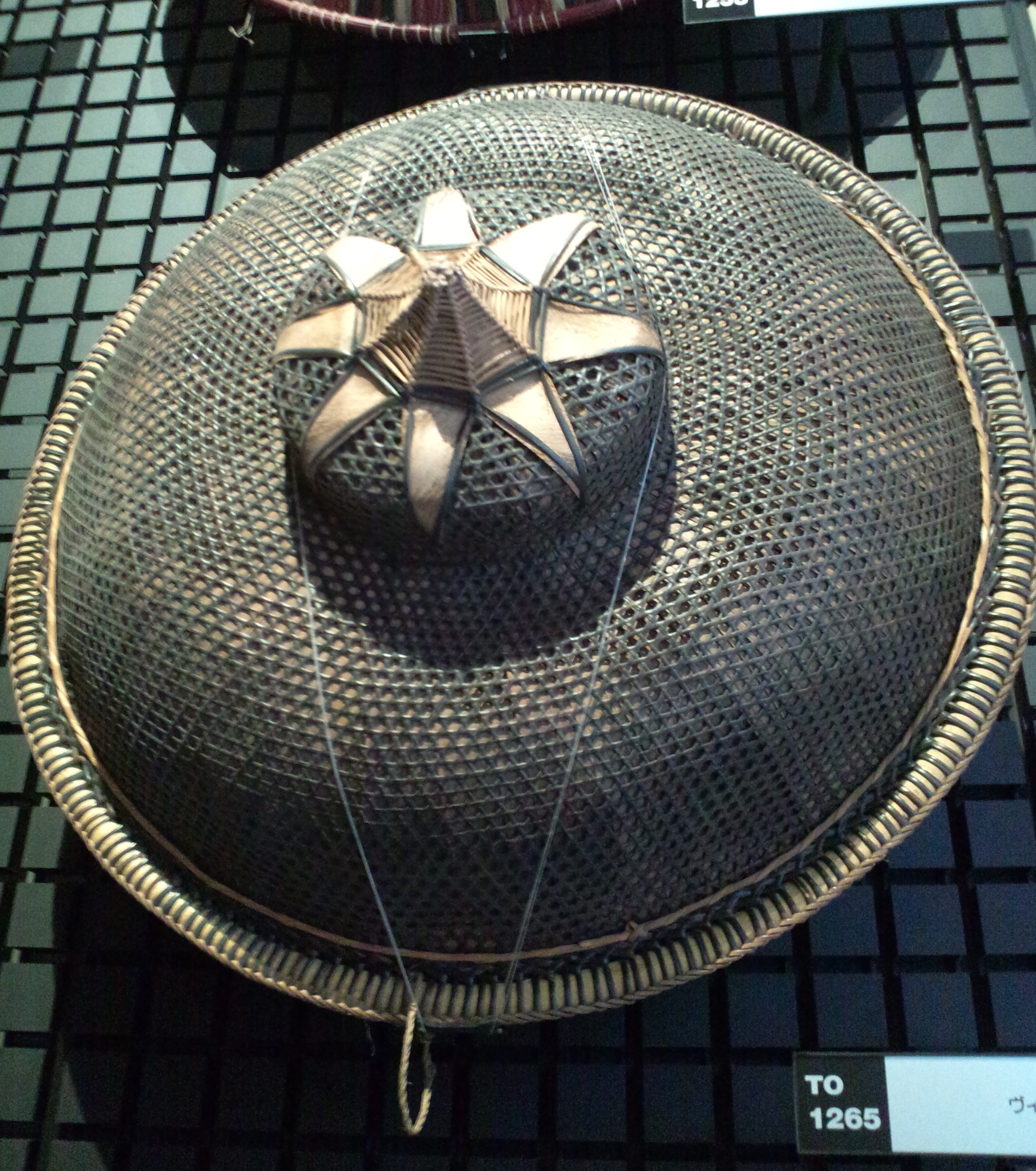
Visayan sarók, made from woven nito fern

== History ==
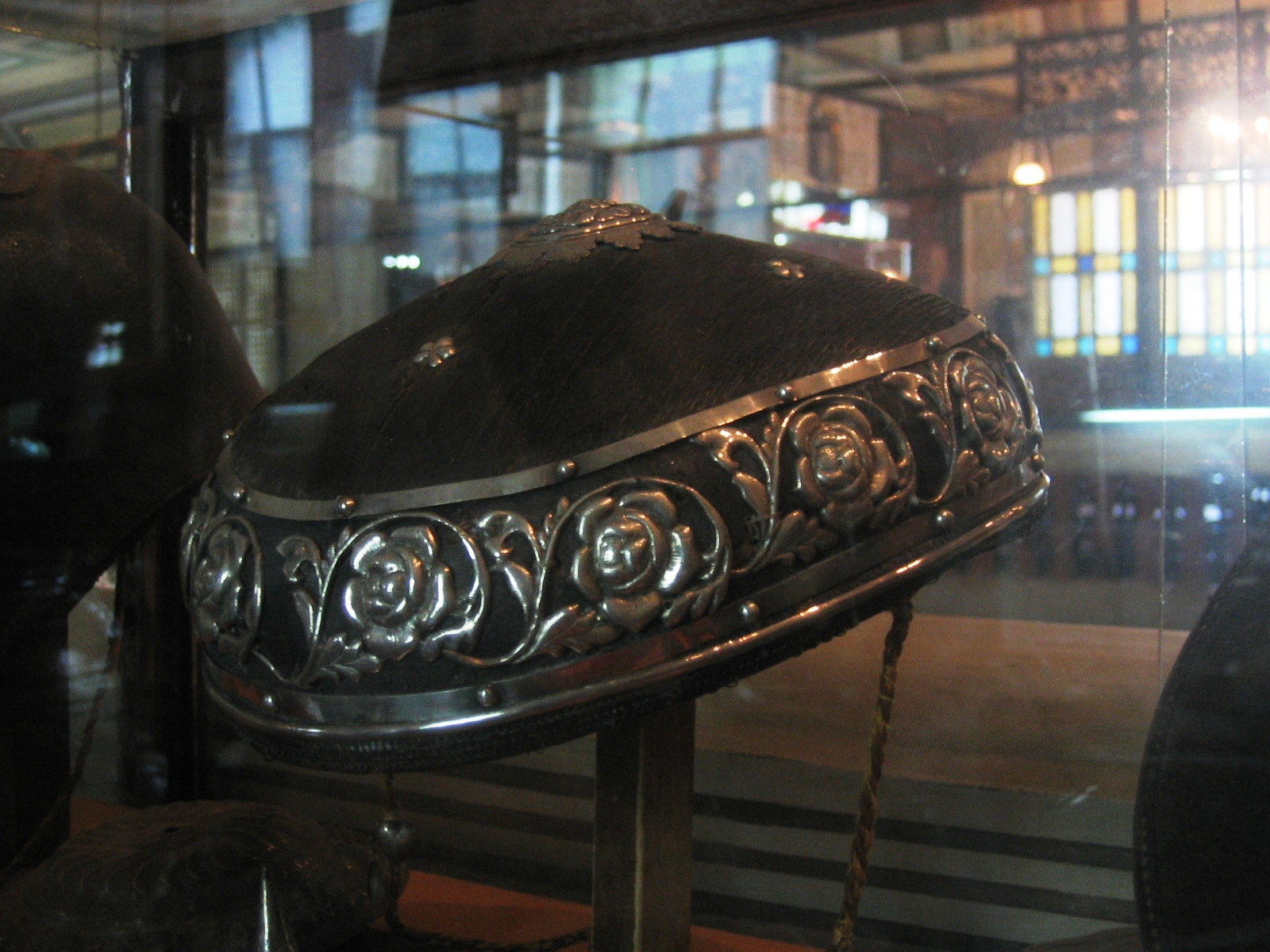
19th-century silver-inlaid salakot in the Villa Escudero Museum

Salakot is part of the pre-colonial culture of the Philippines. The earliest record of salakot was in 1521 when Antonio Pigafetta of Ferdinand Magellan's expedition described a "queen who wore a large hat of palm leaves in the manner of parasol, with a crown about it of the same leaves like the tiara of the pope; and she never goes any place without such one."

During the 19th century in the Spanish colonial era, the salakot were worn as status symbols by members of the aristocratic class (the Principalía) as part of the barong tagalog ensemble.

These Spanish-era salakot were made from prized materials like tortoiseshell and elaborately decorated with gems and precious metals like silver, or, at times, gold. They also commonly had long ornate spikes tipped with horsehair, or have coins or pendants that hung around the rim. Many depictions of gobernadorcillos and cabezas de barangay would portray these colonial public functionaries as wearing ornate salakot.

=== Pith helmets ===
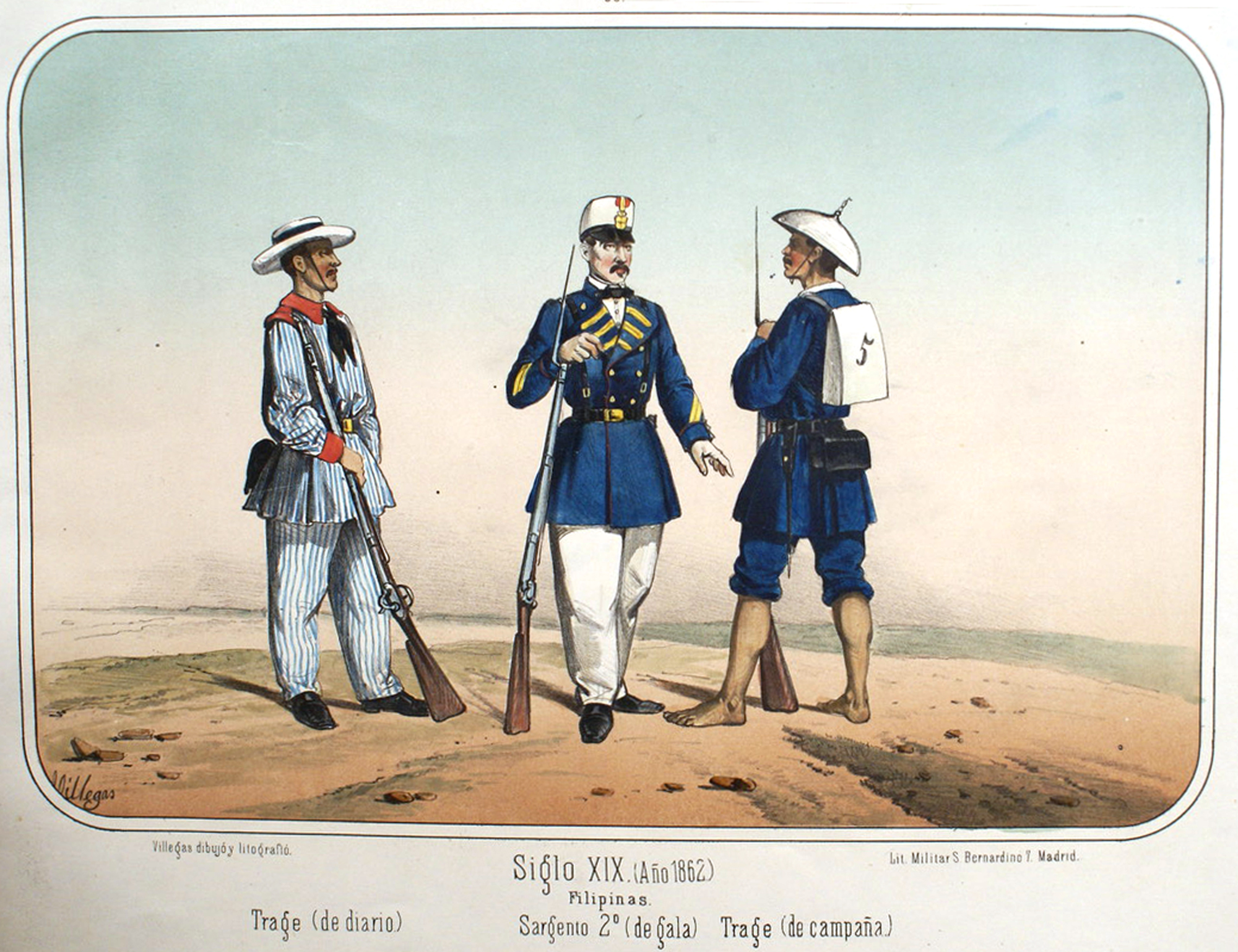
Spanish military uniforms in the Philippines in 1862 showing the salakot (right) worn as part of the trage de campaña (campaign uniform)

Salakot were also widely used as military sun hats in the colonial-era Philippines by both native and Spanish troops in the Spanish Army and the Guardia Civil (where they were known as salacot). They were commonly cloth-covered. This was copied first by the French colonial troops in Indochina who called it the salacco. British and Dutch troops in nearby regions followed suit and the salakot became a common headgear for colonial forces in the mid-19th century.

The salakot was most widely adopted by the British Empire. They began experimenting with derivative designs in search of a lightweight hat for troops serving in tropical regions. This led to a succession of designs ultimately resulting in the "Colonial pattern" pith helmet.

French marines also introduced the early version of the salacco to the French Antilles, where it became the salako.

=== Military use in the Philippines ===
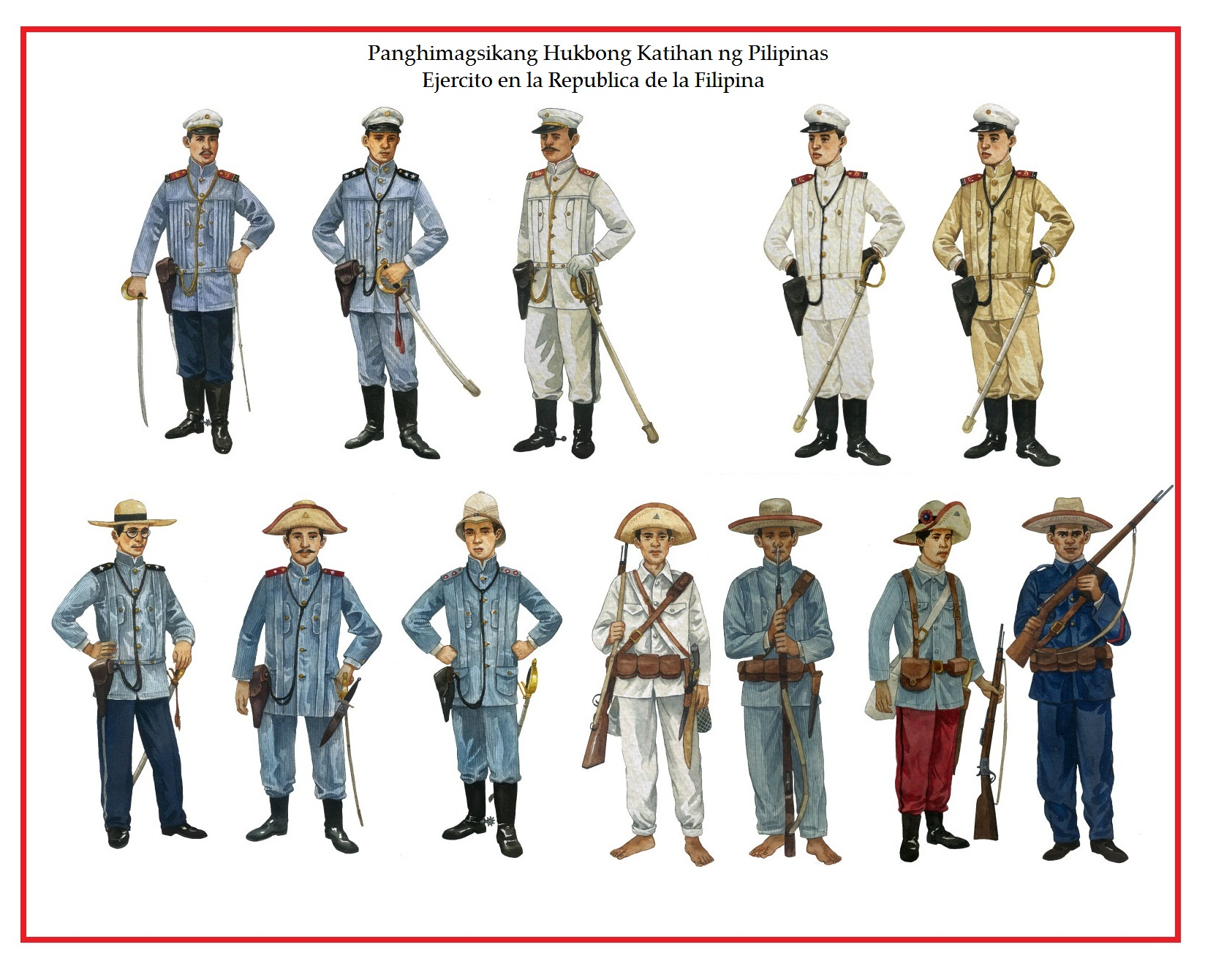
Filipino military uniforms used by the Philippine Republican Army, with the salakot being shown in the bottom right.

The salakot was used as the headgear by the Philippine Republican Army, the military force of the First Philippine Republic. It was worn alongside the Mambisa Rayadillo uniform and served both practical and symbolic purposes, the salakot provided protection from the tropical climate while also gave Filipino soldiers a distinctive appearance that made them easily distinguishable from their colonial adversaries during the Philippine Revolution, and the Philippine–American War. In contemporary times, the salakot continues to be used by the Philippine government for state and military ceremonies, it is often worn by Honor guards during the celebration of Philippine independence in June 12.

== Cultural significance ==
The salakot is a common symbol for Filipino identity, often worn by the National personification Juan dela Cruz along with a barong tagalog. The kattukung made from bottle gourd is also commonly associated with the 18th-century Ilocano revolutionary leader Diego Silang.

In 2012, Teofilo Garcia of Abra in Luzon, expert artisan of a special kind of salakot made of bottle gourd (Lagenaria siceraria) was awarded by the National Commission for Culture and the Arts with the "Gawad sa Manlilikha ng Bayan" (National Living Treasures Award) for his dedication to the traditional craft of making gourd salakot, affirming the status of the salakot as one of the intangible cultural heritage of the Philippines under the traditional craftsmanship category.

== Gallery ==
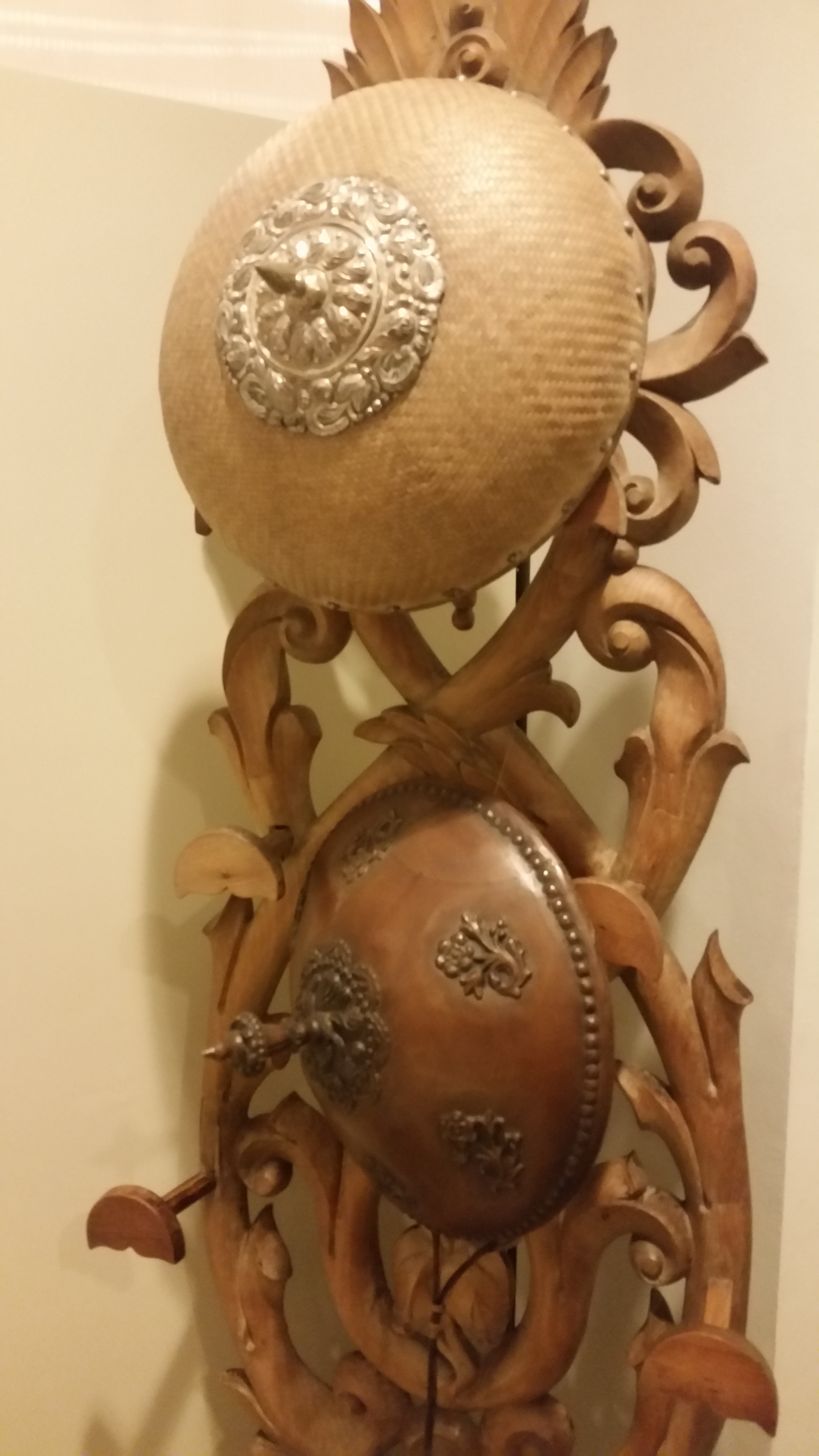
Salakot displayed in the Bangko Sentral ng Pilipinas Money Museum

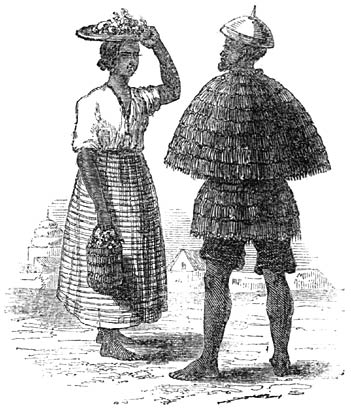
Illustration of an Ilocano man and woman. The man is wearing a kattukong. c.1820

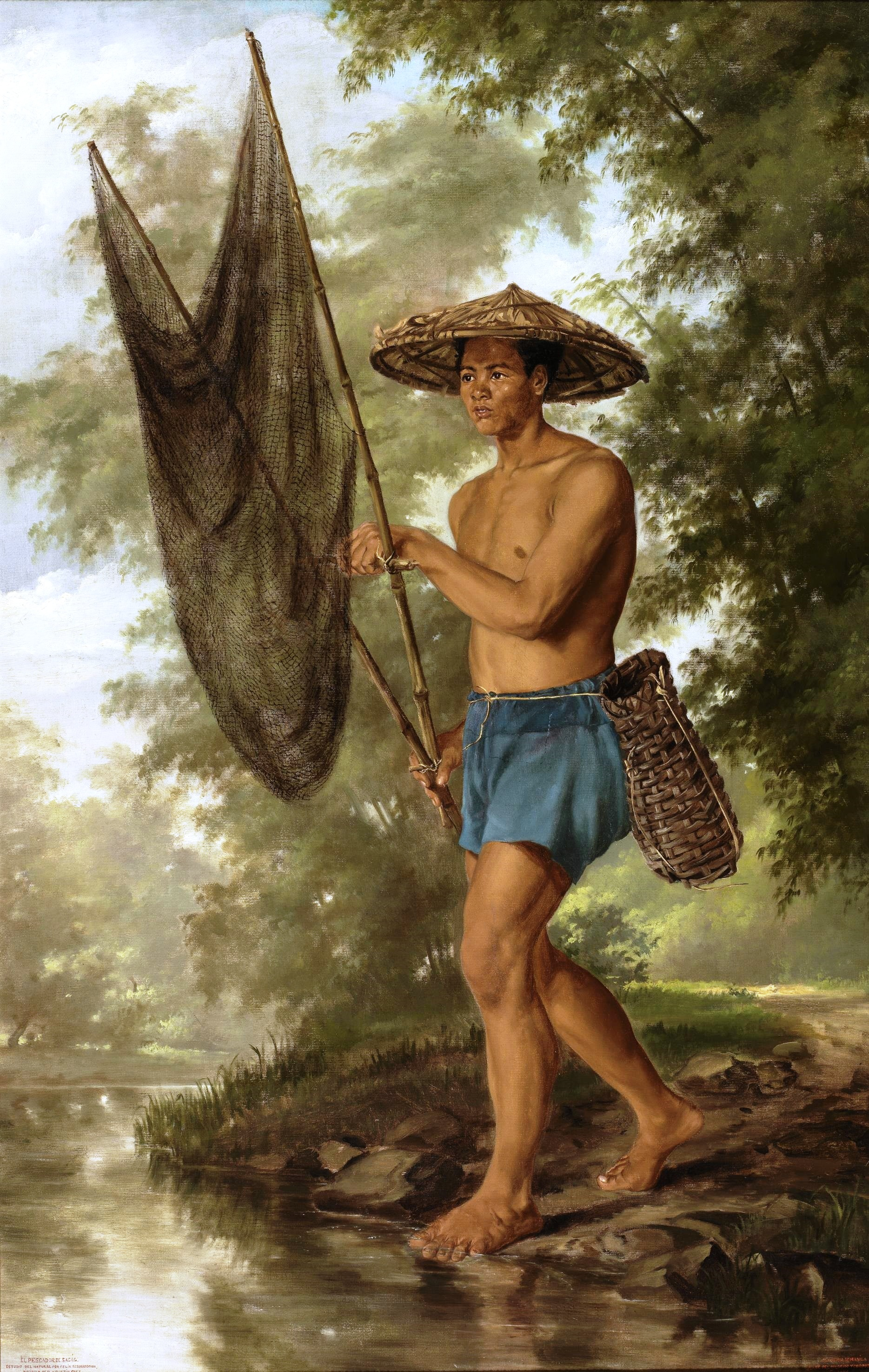
El pescador de Sacag, a painting of a fisherman with a salakot by Félix Resurrección Hidalgo, c.1875

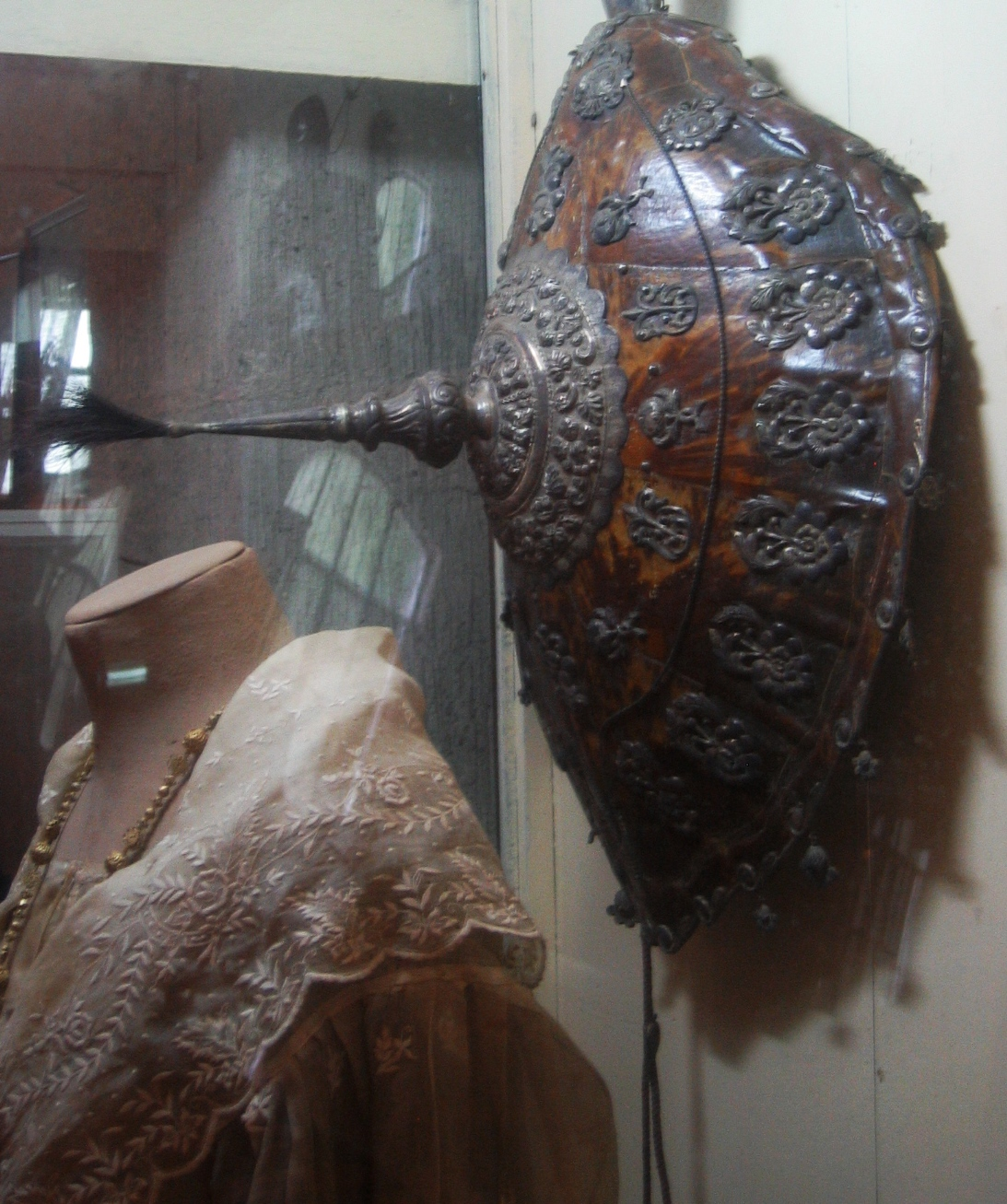
Tortoiseshell salakot with inlaid silver in the Villa Escudero Museum

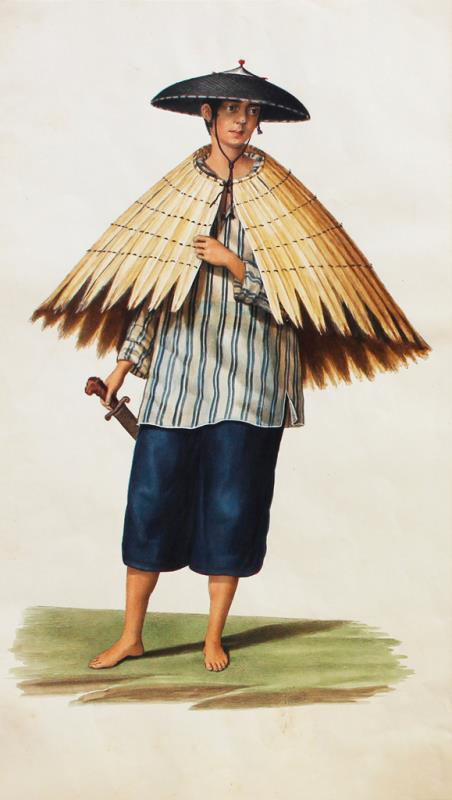
A Filipino peasant with a salakot and traditional raincoat, by Justiniano Asuncion, c.1841

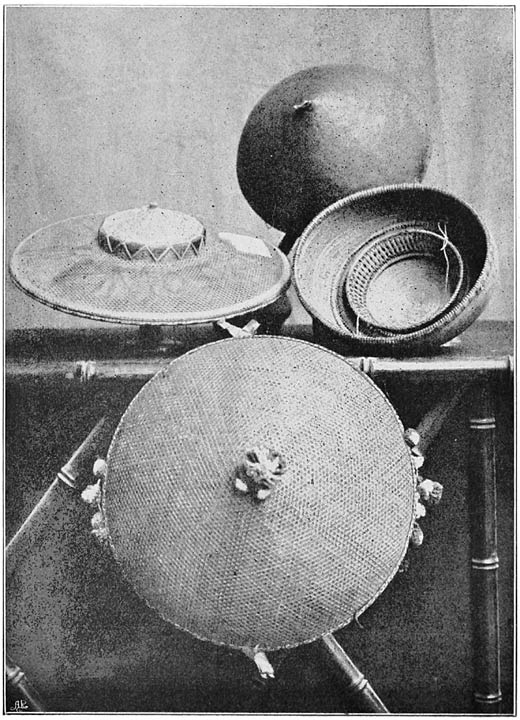
Various types of salakot from the Philippines, c.1900. The inner headband is visible on the middle right salakot.

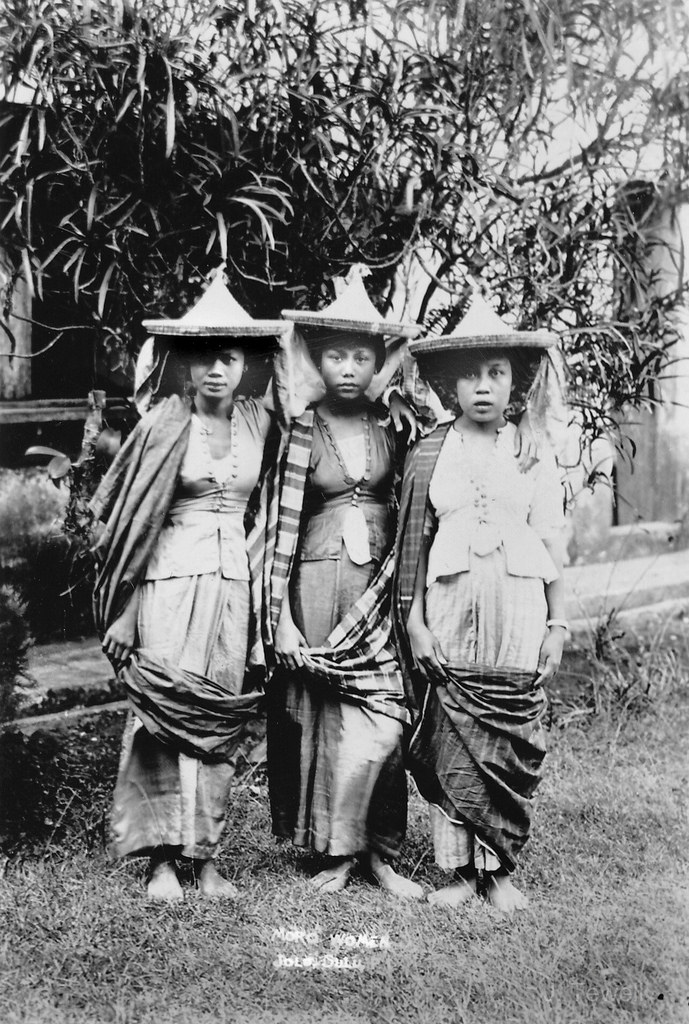
Three Sama-Bajau women from Jolo, Sulu wearing saruk, c.1900

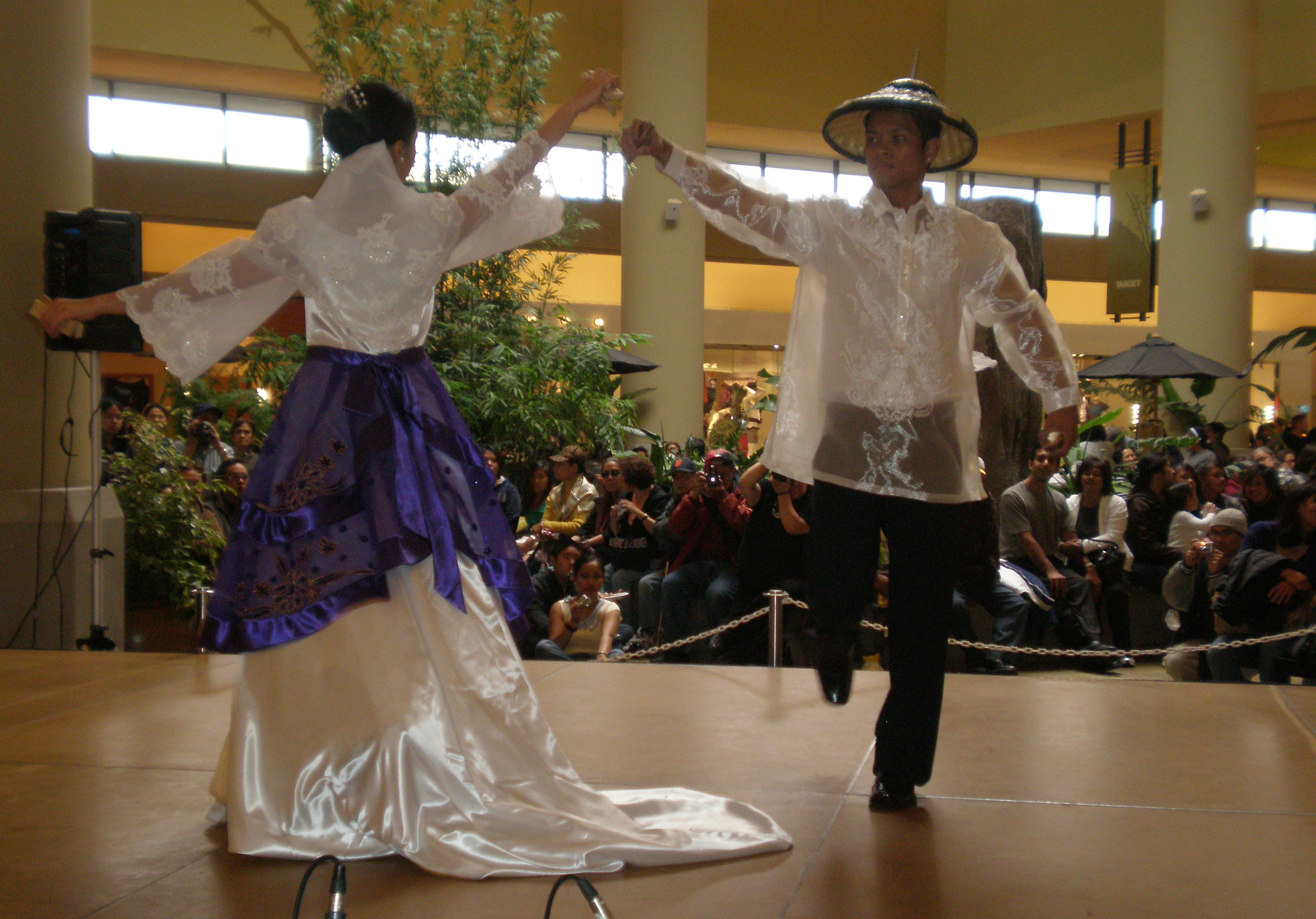
Dancers performing Jota Manileña, the man is wearing a barong tagalog with a salakot

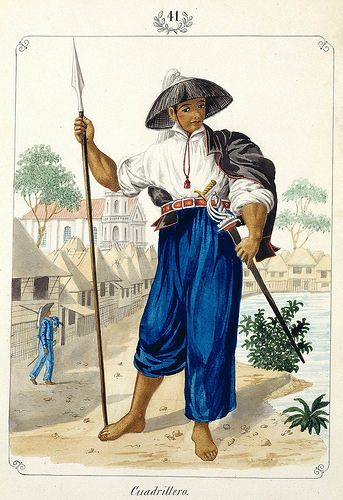
Cuadrillero by José Honorato Lozano, depicting a 'cuadrillero' or village police (local deputies or constables) in a salakot with a horsehair plume, c.1847

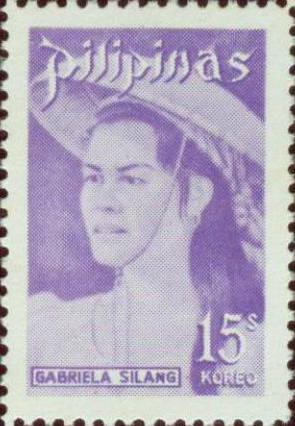
Revolutionary leader Gabriela Silang shown wearing a salakot in a 1974 postage stamp

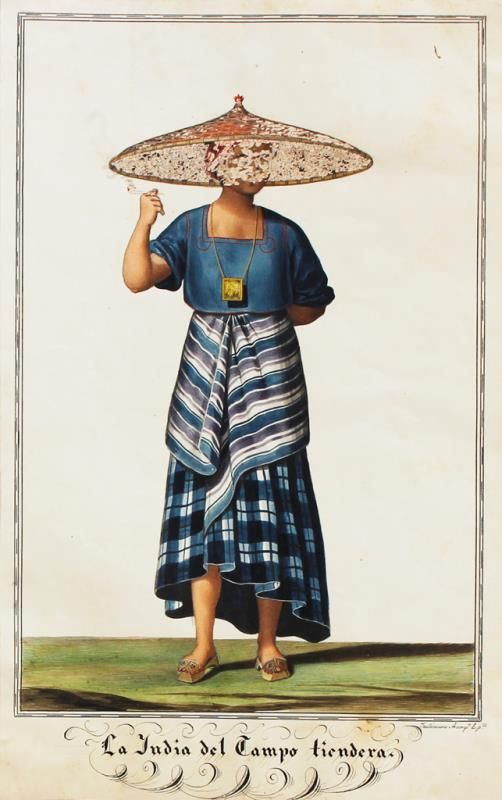
La Yndia del Campo Tiendera by Justiniano Asuncion

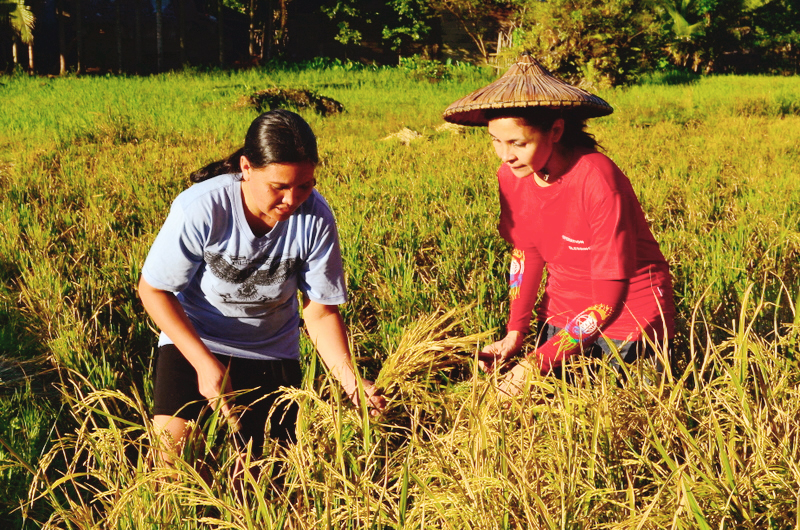
Salakot worn by a woman harvesting rice

== See also ==
- List of hat styles
- Asian conical hat
- Barong tagalog
- Buntal hat
- History of the Philippines (1521–1898)
- Kasa
- Vakul
