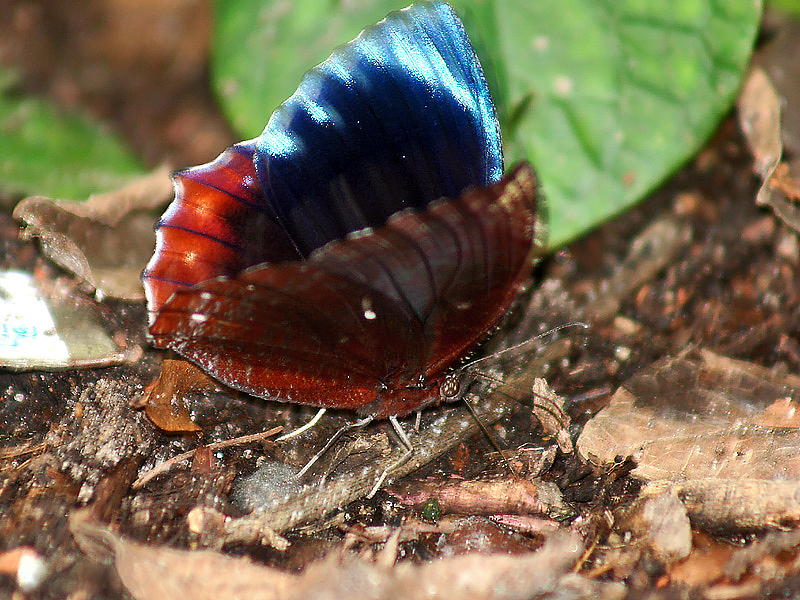
- Elymnias hypermnestra undularis, Kolkata, India
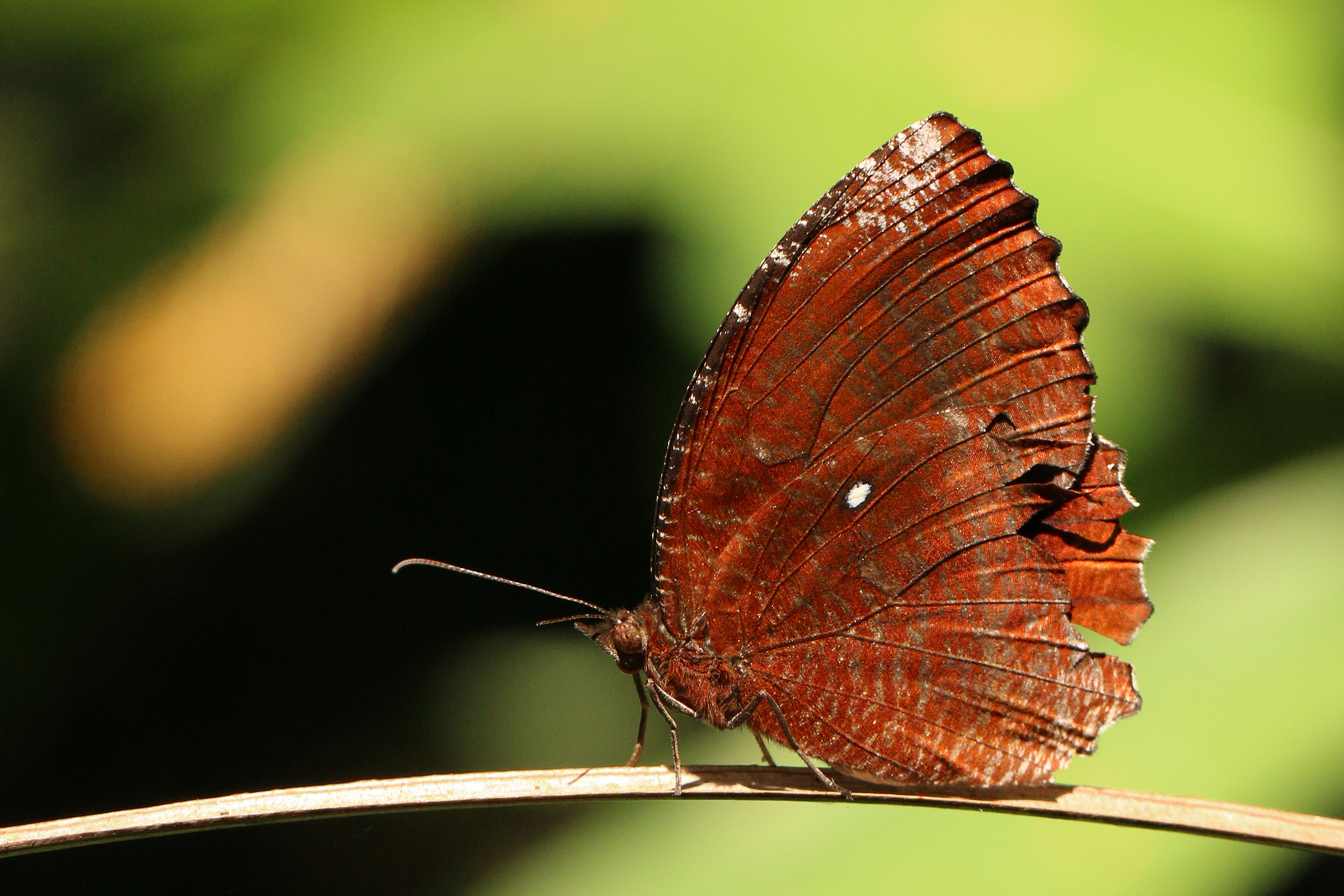
- Elymnias hypermnestra baliensis, Bali, Indonesia

Scientific classification
- Kingdom: Animalia
- Phylum: Arthropoda
- Clade: Pancrustacea
- Class: Insecta
- Order: Lepidoptera
- Family: Nymphalidae
- Genus: Elymnias
- Species: E. hypermnestra

Binomial name
- Elymnias hypermnestra (Linnaeus, 1763)

= Elymnias hypermnestra =

Common palmfly

Species of butterfly

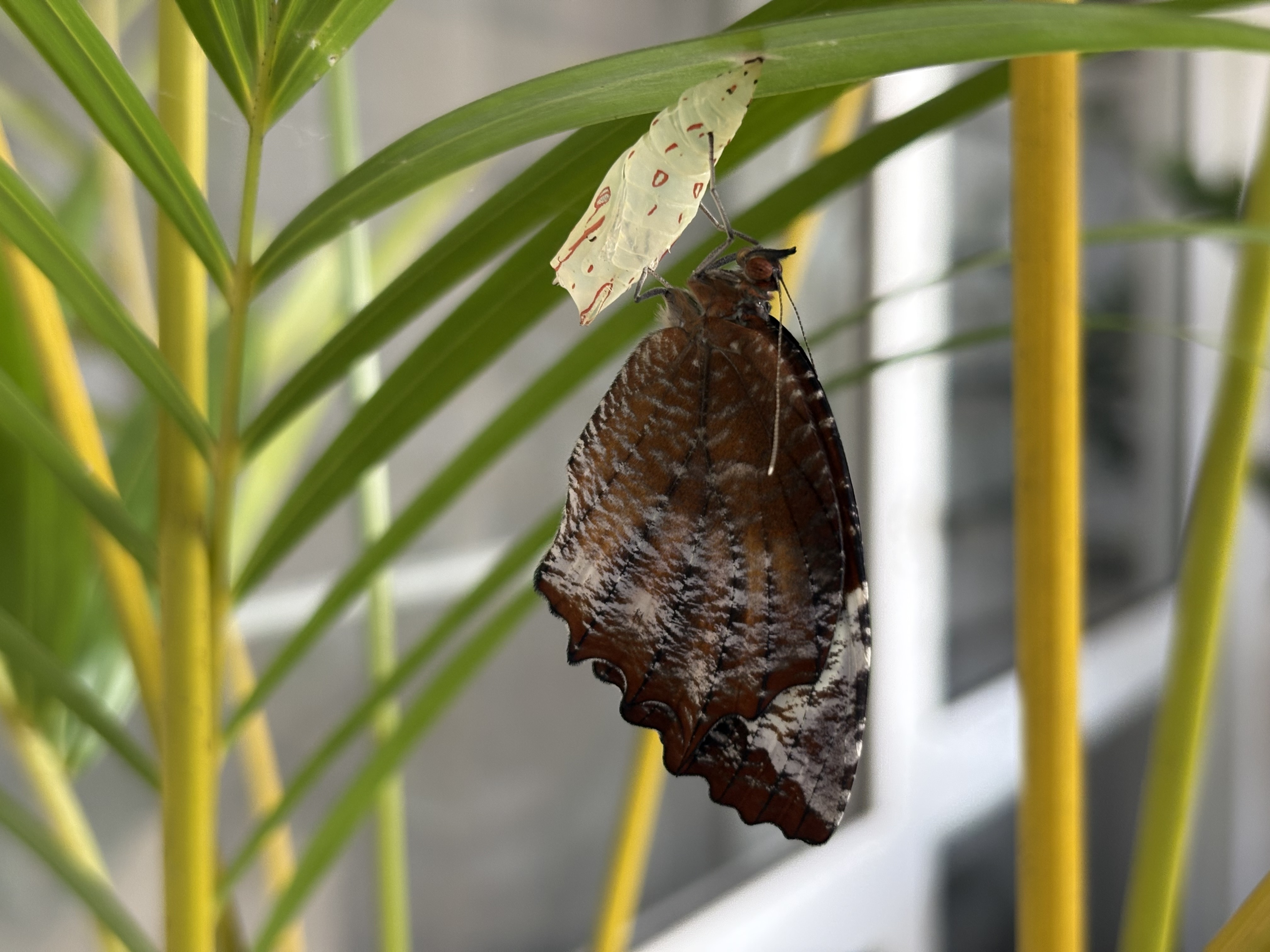
A male Common Palmfly (Elymnias hypermnestra) freshly emerged from its chrysalis.

Elymnias hypermnestra, the common palmfly, is a species of satyrine butterfly found in South and Southeast Asia.

== Description ==
As in some other species in the genus Elymnias, the common palmfly has a precostal cell in the hindwings and a tuft of androconial scales on the dorsal discal cell of the hindwings. Some populations of this butterfly species are sexually dimorphic: males and females do not look alike. In sexually dimorphic populations, males have black upperside forewings with small blue patches and mimic Euploea species, while the females mimic butterfly species of the genus Danaus.

Race undularis (Subhimalayas and Southeast Asia) male upperside blackish brown. Forewing with a subterminal series of blue or sometimes slightly green elongate spots, curving strongly inwards and getting more elongate opposite the apex, forming almost an oblique bar up to the costa. Hindwing: the terminal margin broadly bright chestnut, sometimes with a subterminal paler spot in two or more of the interspaces. Underside pale brown, the basal two-thirds of both forewing and hindwing densely, the outer third more sparsely covered with dark ferruginous, somewhat broad, transverse striae. Forewing with a broadly triangular pale purplish-white preapical mark; both forewings and hindwings with a broad subterminal area purplish white. Hindwing with a small white spot opposite middle of the costa and a more or less complete series of more obscure whitish subterminal spots. Antennae, head, thorax and abdomen brown; abdomen beneath paler.

Female upperside tawny, veins black. Forewing: the dorsal margin broadly black; the apical area beyond a line curving from the tornus, round apex of the cell and a little beyond it, to the base of the costa also black, the wing crossed preapically by a conspicuous, broad, oblique white bar, and three subterminal white spots. Hindwing: dorsal margin dusky; terminal broadly, costal margin more narrowly, black; a subterminal series of four white spots. Underside tawny, with markings similar to those in the male; the pale whitish markings more extensive; the dorsal margin broadly without striae.

Race fraterna, Butler (Sri Lanka) is an insular representative of E. undularis. The male differs on the upperside in the more or less complete absence of the subterminal and preapical blue markings on the forewing; and in the broad terminal border of the hindwing being of a much brighter, almost ochraceous chestnut. On the underside the pale markings are somewhat restricted. The male very closely resembles, both on the upper and underside, the male of E. undularis.

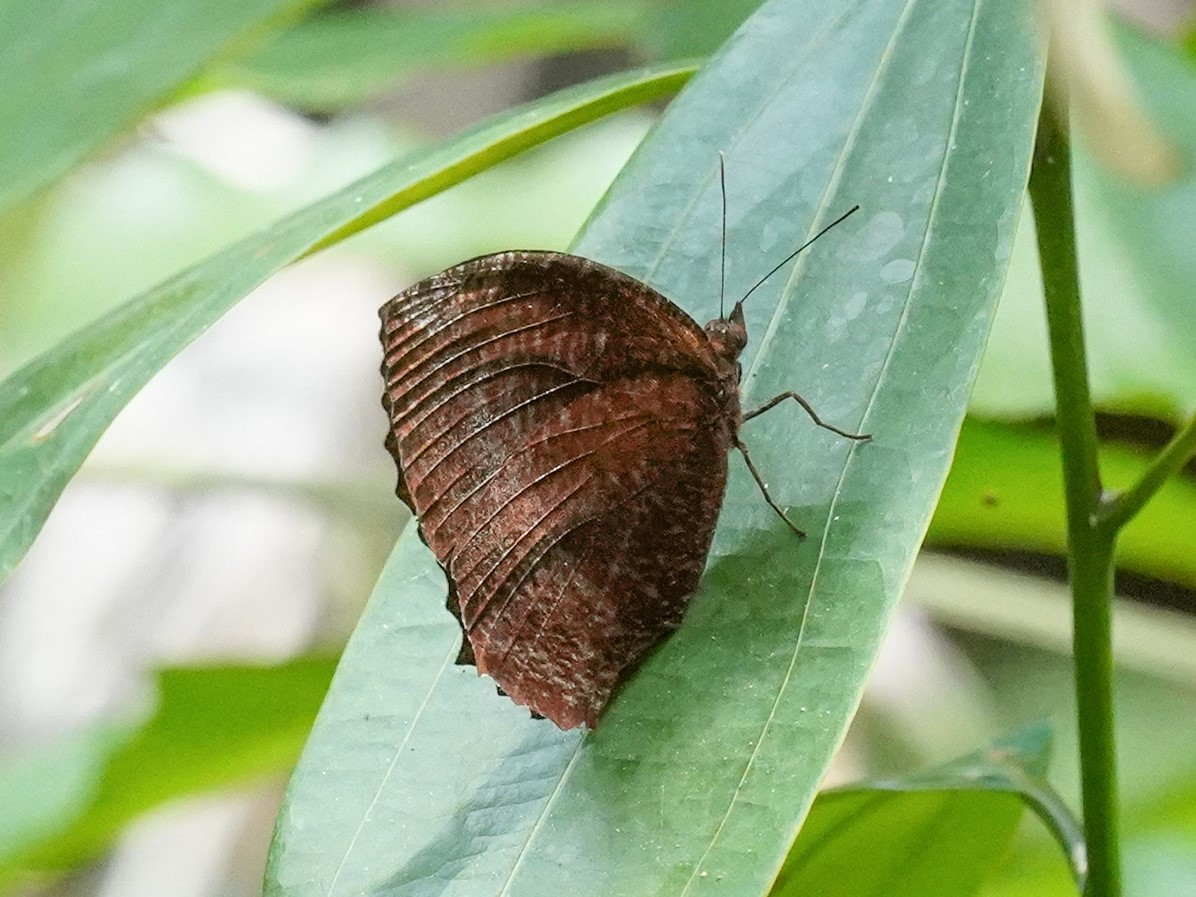
E. h. beatrice, Borneo

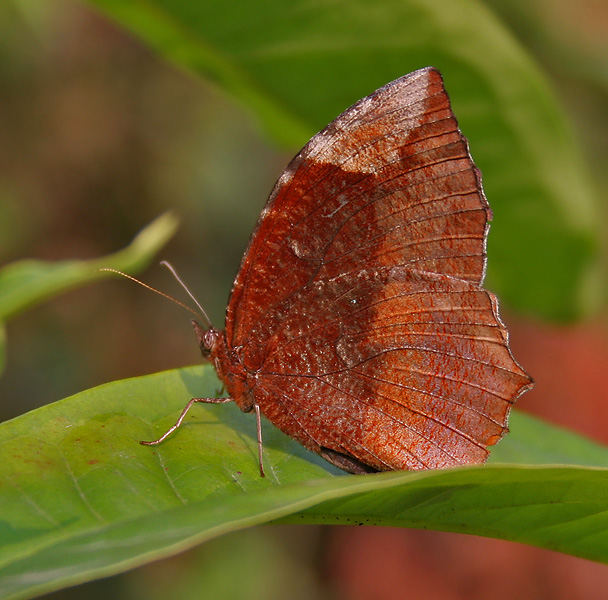
female E. h. undularis, West Bengal, India

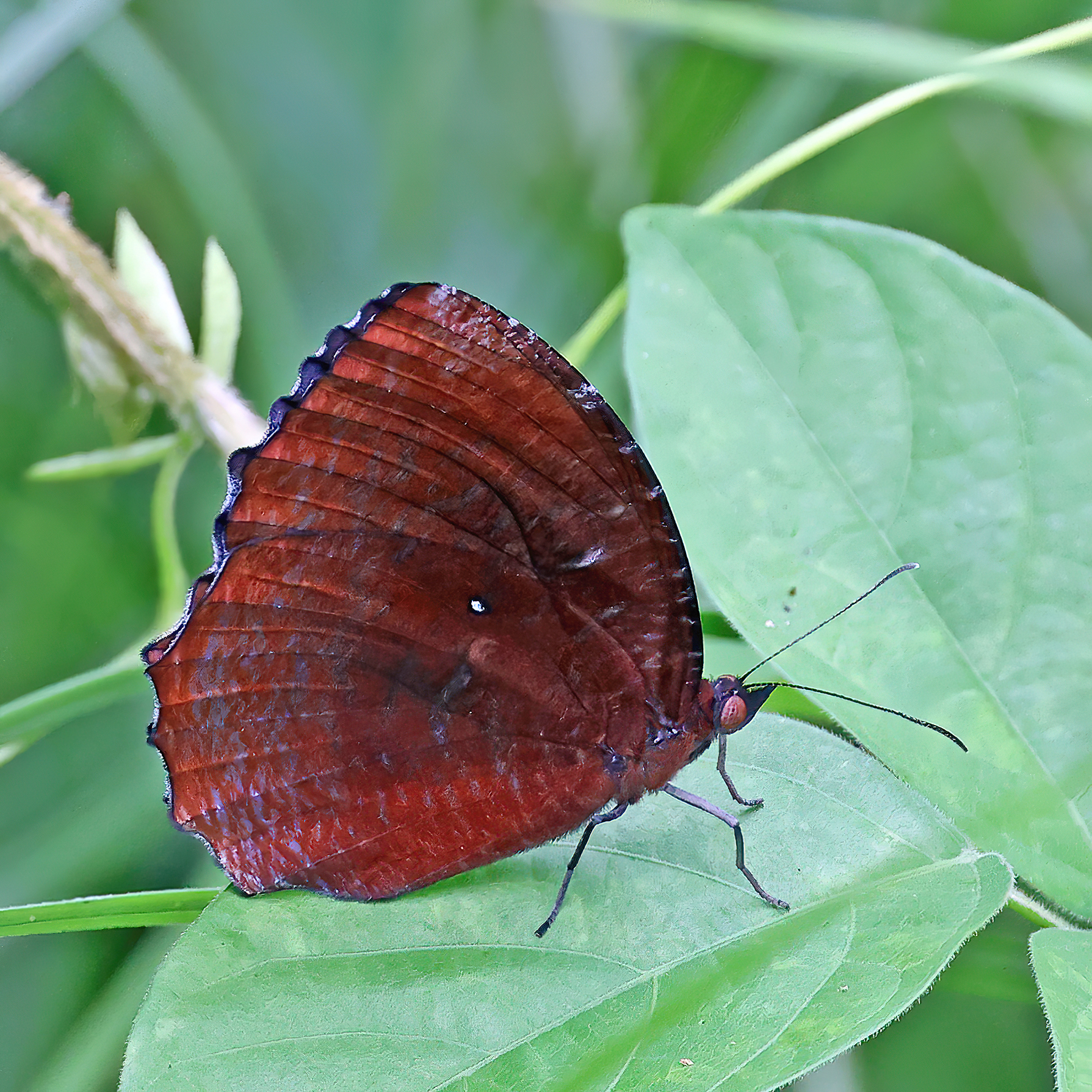
male E. h. tinctoria, Thailand

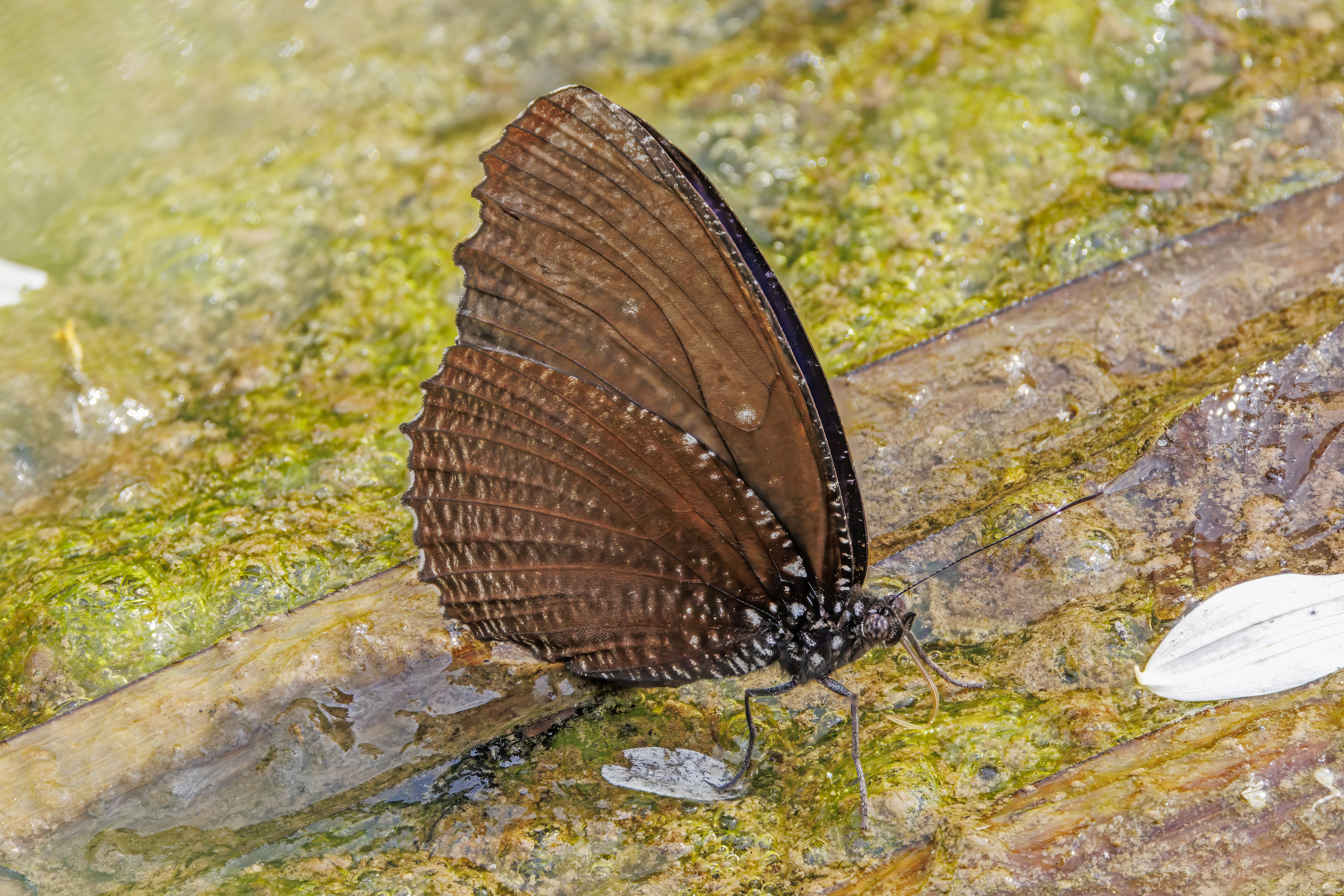
E. h. violetta, Laos

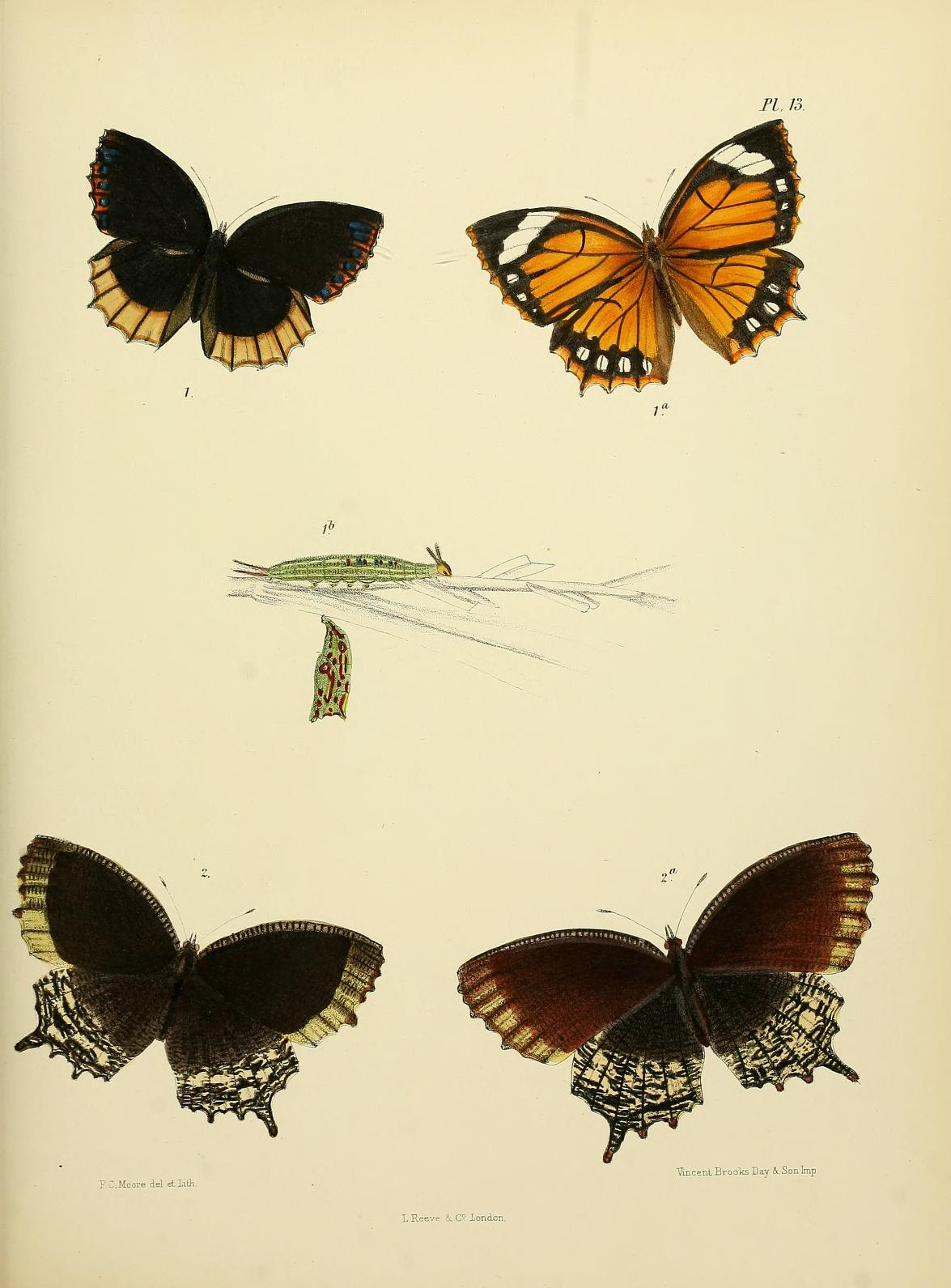
E. h. fraterna Butler, 1871, larva and pupa Figs. 1, 1a, 1b.

== Range ==
Peninsular India, sub-Himalayas, and Southeast Asia.

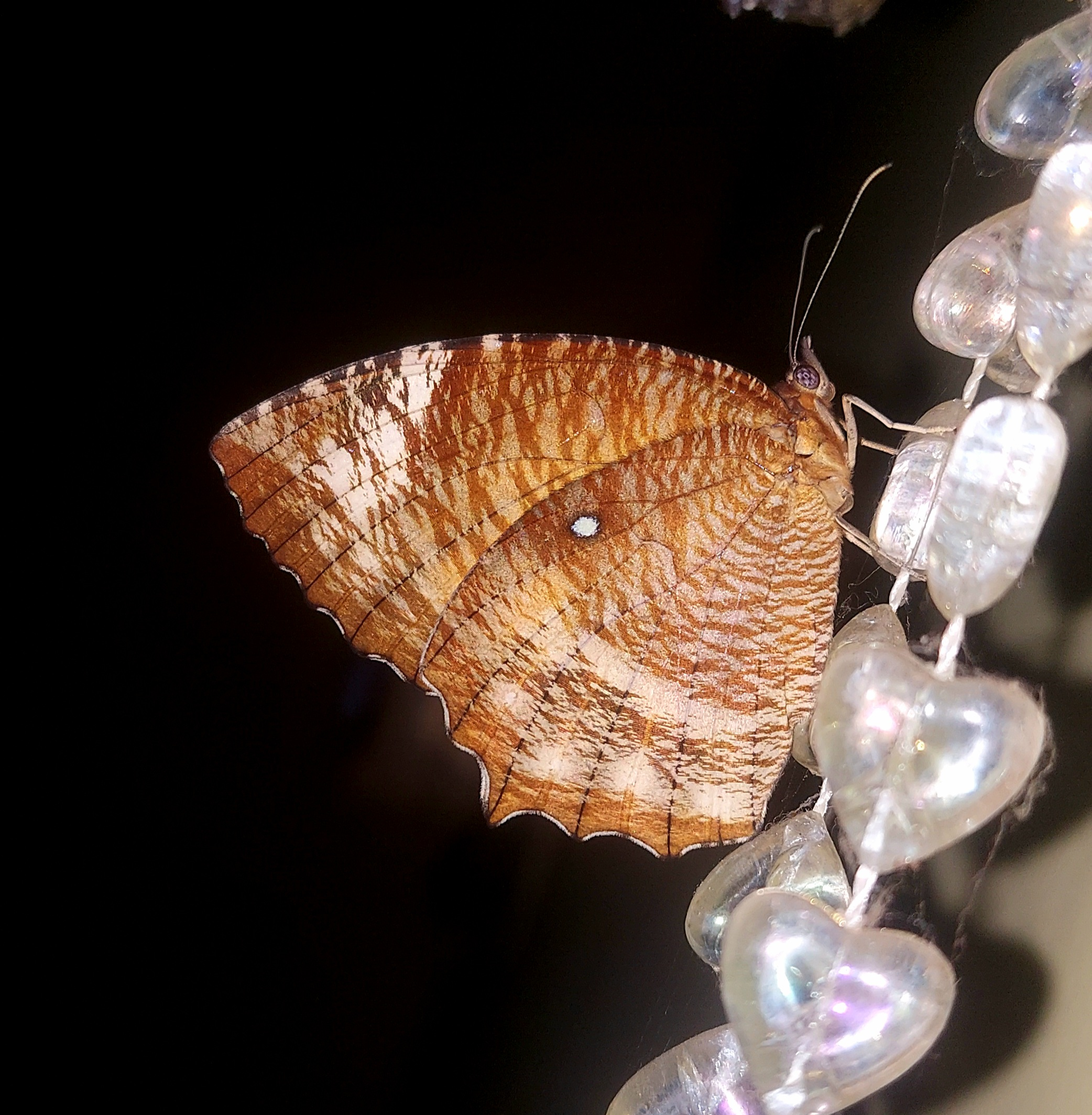
from Sri Lanka

== Life history ==
=== Food plants ===
Cocos nucifera (coconut) Calamus pseudo-tenuis, Calamus rotang, Calamus thwaitesii, Phoenix loureiroi and Licuala species.

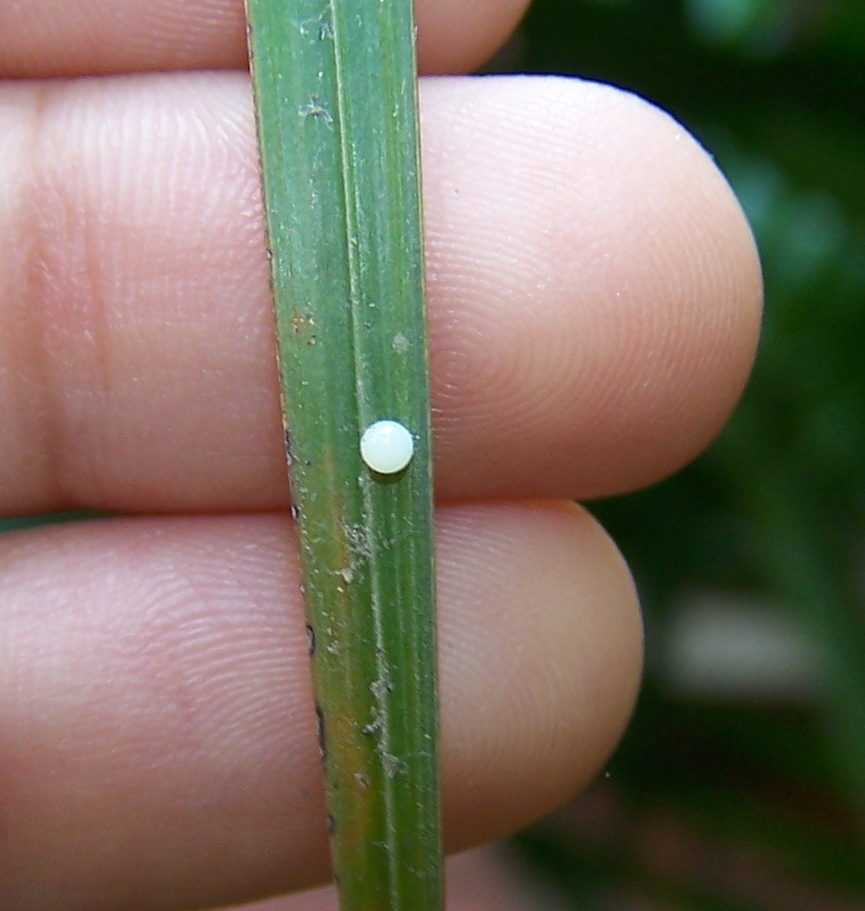
Egg

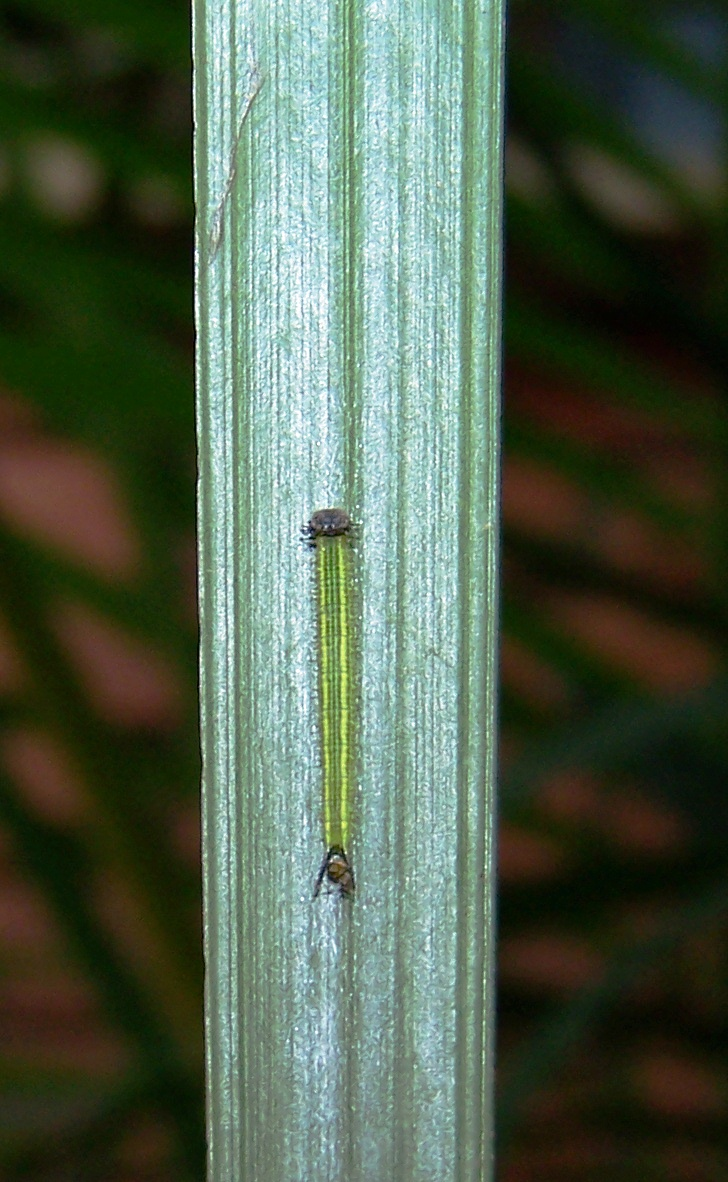
Young larva

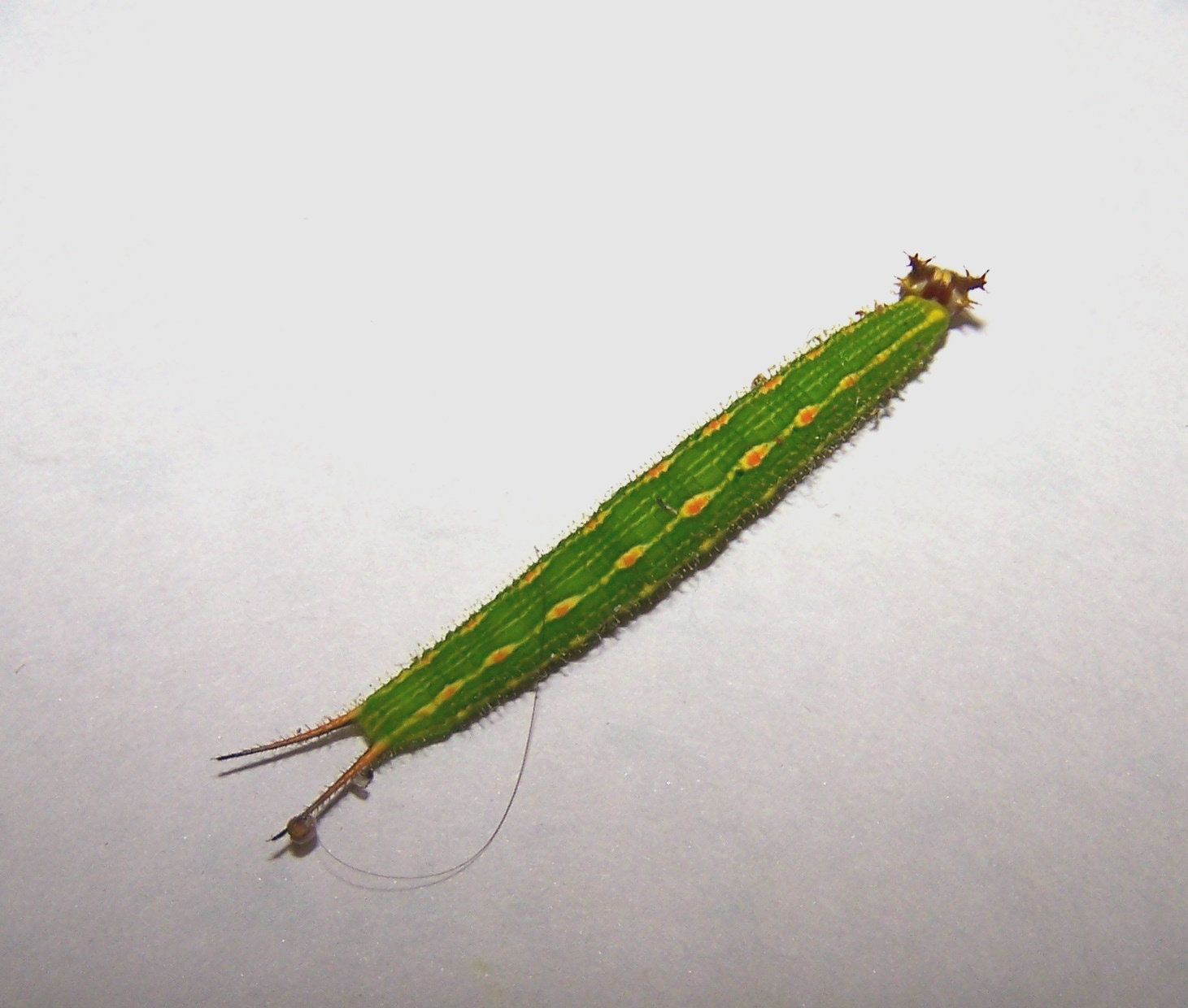
Older larva

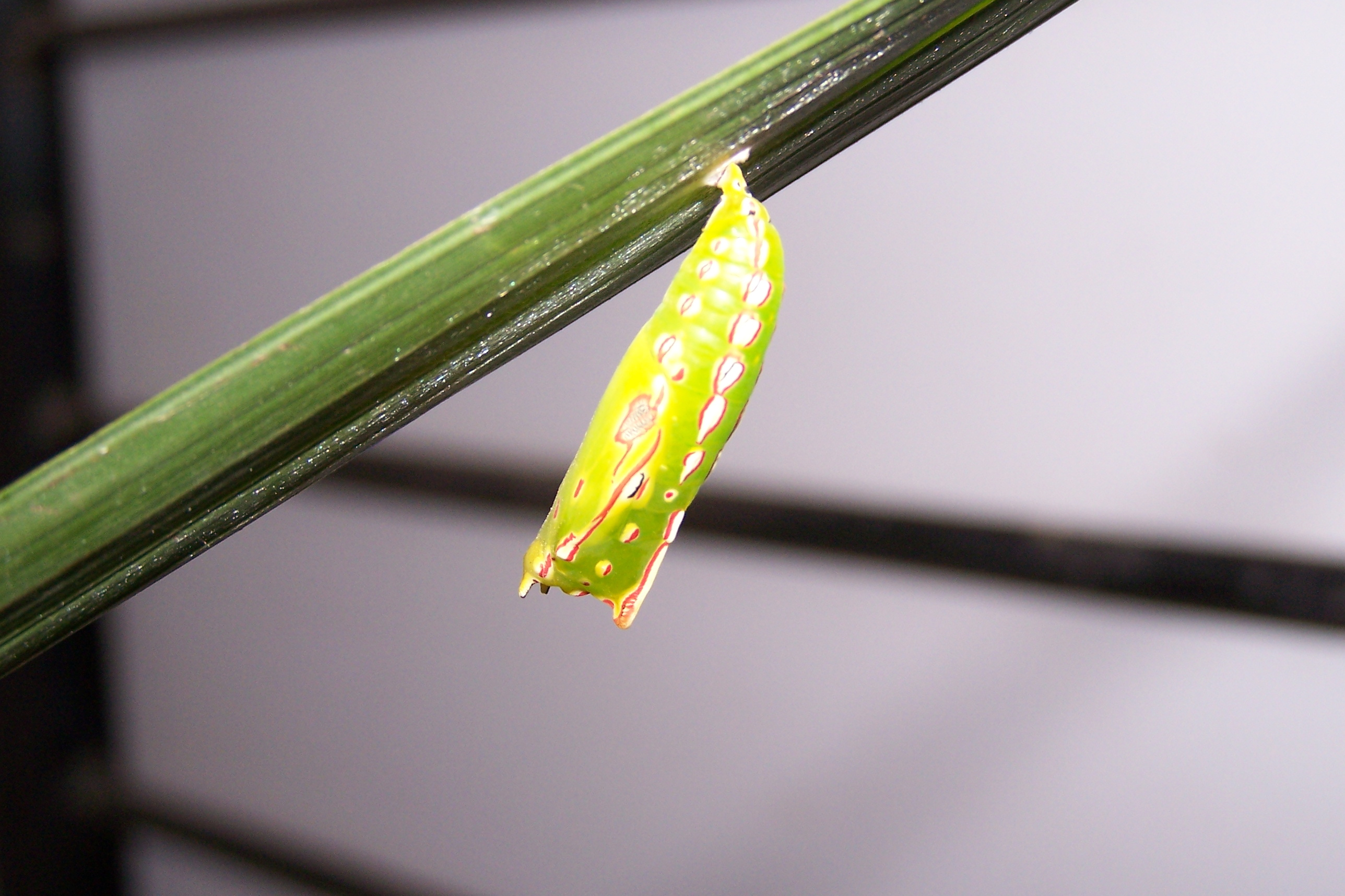
Pupa

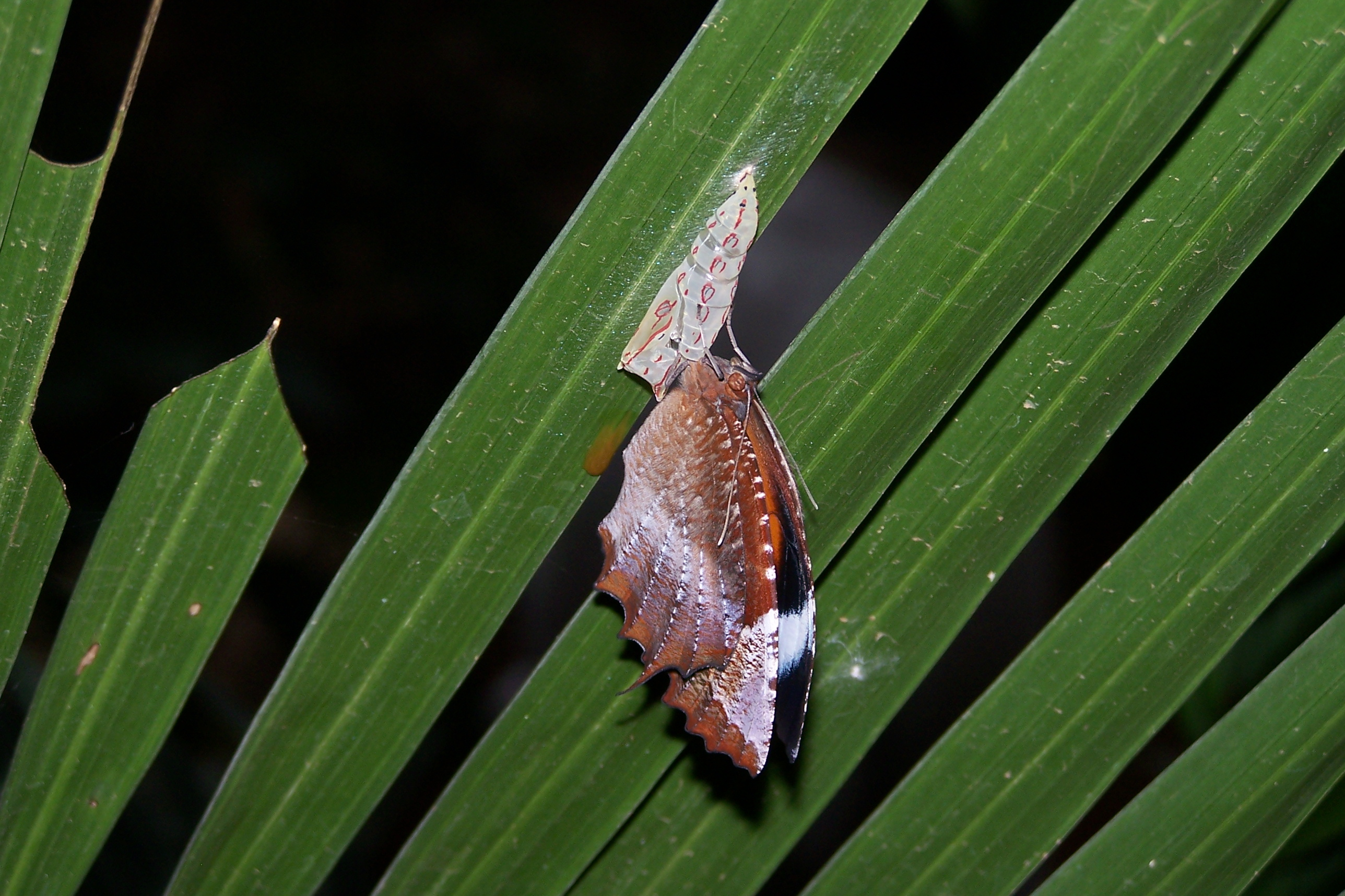
Freshly emerged male

Life cycle

=== Larva ===
Race caudata "Spindle-shaped, slender, transversely rugose and clothed with short stout bristles...; head large, surmounted by two stout horns, sloping backwards, slightly branched at the ends; a pair of long straight caudal spines setose like the body; colour bright green with longitudinal yellow lines more or less distinct and two rows of large yellow spots tinged with green and sometimes tipped with black on the back; head dark brown, with a yellow cheek-stripe and frontal-line."

Race undularis "Elongate, fusiform, setose; green with longitudinal dorsal and lateral yellow lines, and a subdorsal row of yellow elongated spots, which are centred with red and posteriorly edged with blue; head brownish, armed with two erect brownish setose processes; anal segment also with two red slender hindward-projecting processes."

Larvae are known to be cannibalistic.

=== Pupa ===
"Suspended by the tail only, but in a rigidly horizontal position, regular with the exception of two small pointed processes from the head and an acute thoracic projection above them; colour bright green, beautifully ornamented with four irregular rows of large yellow spots bordered with red." (Davidson & Aitken quoted by Bingham.)
