= Vakul =

Headgear worn by Ivatan women

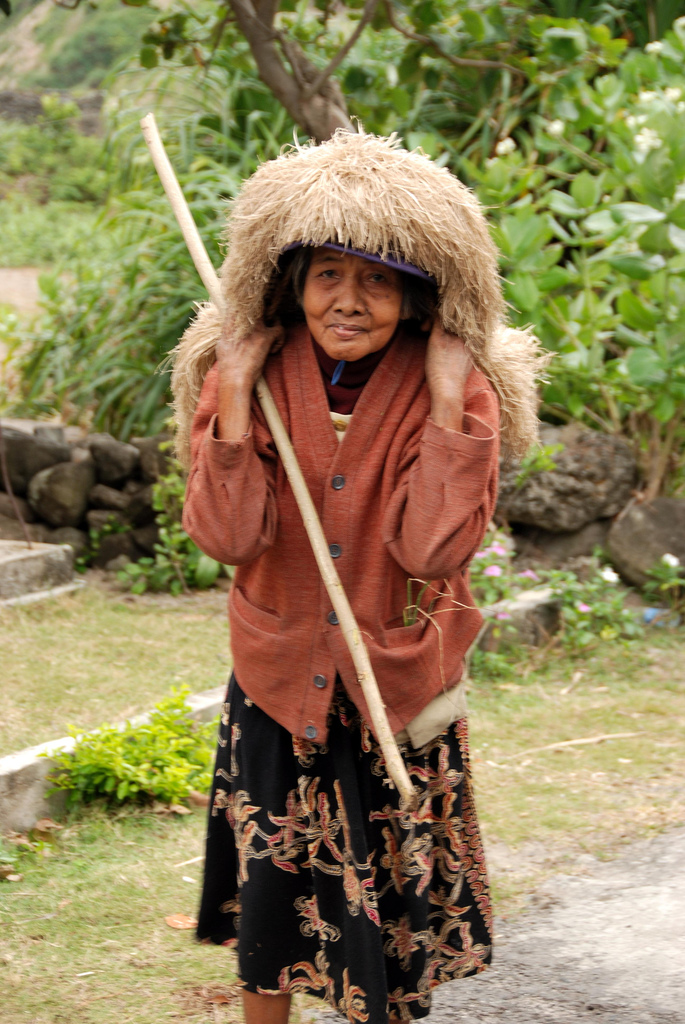
An Ivatan woman wearing a vakul

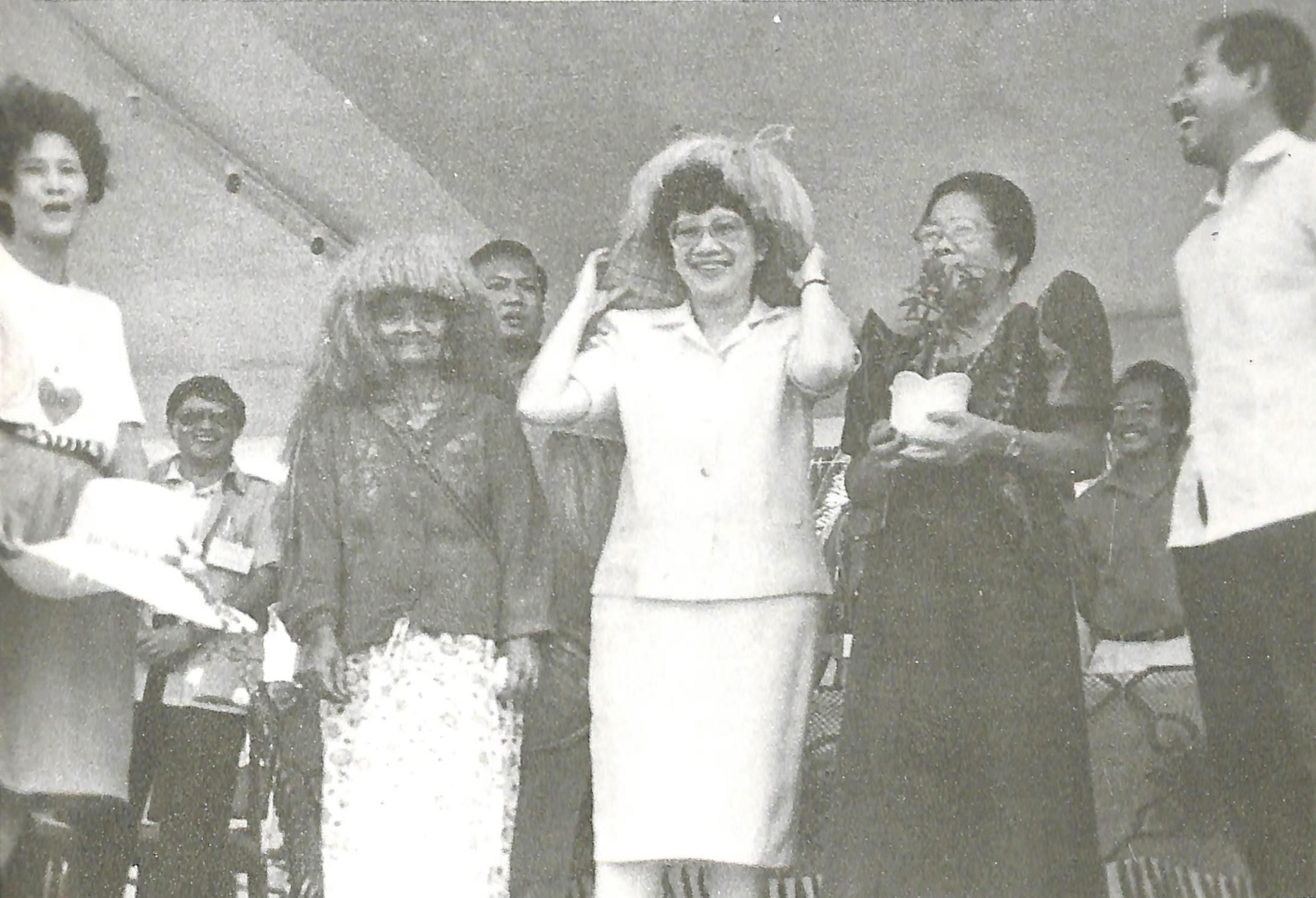
Philippine President Corazon Aquino wearing a vakul in 1989 during a visit to Batanes

A vakul (called a suot or soot when worn by men) is a protective headdress made and typically worn by Ivatan women of the Philippine Batanes and Babuyan Islands. It is woven from strands of abacá and vuyavuy palm fiber, and is designed to shield the wearer from excessive sun, wind, and rain. It can also serve as a mat for babies or as a pillow for farmers resting in their fields. The headgear consists of a hood going around the head and a cape down the back.

To make vakul, collected vuyavuy leaves are first shredded with a metal brush, leaving the leaf's central rachis (central spine) intact, and then hung to air-dry for three days before being cut lengthwise along the rachis. Higher-quality vakul have a strip of abacá banana leaf string (made by quickly rolling abacá fiber between one's palm and leg) wrapped around the rachis. This makes the headdress more comfortable on the skin. Approximately fifty of these half-fronds are laid out overlapping in horizontal rows, which are then fastened together from top to bottom using plastic or abacá string. Each row of leaves is bound at the edges of the cape to abacá fiber. The fibers around the head are then trimmed above eye level. The hood is made waterproof by two pieces of abacá stem tissue covering the central eye of the hood. The headdress is then hung to air-dry for three days, during which it goes from green to straw-yellow. Vakul made entirely from abacá are called vakul abacá.

Vakul take weeks to make, but are expected to last a lifetime, and are passed on between generations. Only women may weave vakul, and the handicraft is transmitted orally rather than in schools. They are kept in the house and combed for maintenance.

The vakul predates the arrival of the Spanish to the Philippines, outlasting the traditional bark clothing, which was replaced by handwoven cotton during the Spanish era. The Philippine Star describes the vakul as "an image synonymous with Batanes". A festival dedicated to the vakul and its male counterpart, a jacket called the kanayi or talugong, takes place annually in Sabtang. Some women in Sabtang earn a living from vakul-weaving, including for souvenirs. Sir Anril Tiatco writes that Sabtang "takes pride in being the home of the finest vakul and talugong weavers."
