= Ivatan people =

Austronesian ethnolinguistic group

Ibatan
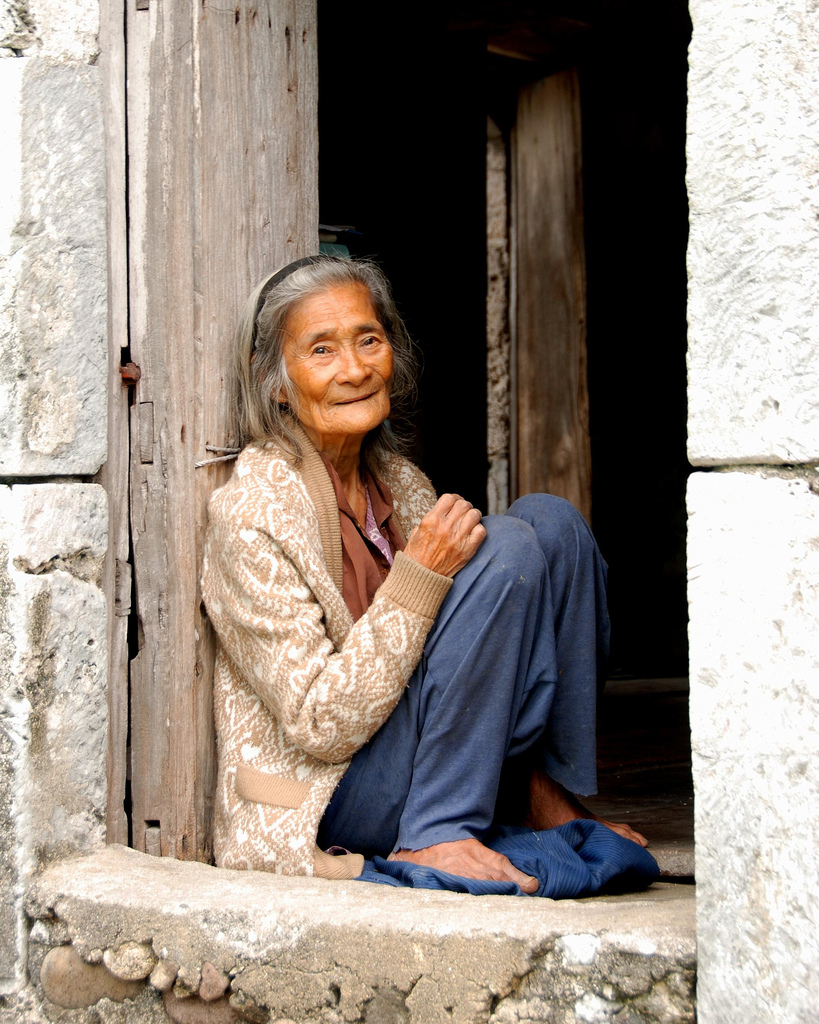
- An Ivatan woman

Total population
- 38,622 (2020 census)

Regions with significant populations
- Philippines (Batanes)

Languages
- Ivatan, Ilocano, Tagalog, English

Religion
- Christianity (predominantly Roman Catholicism), minority also, ancestral worship

Related ethnic groups
- Tao people, Taiwanese aborigines, Ilocanos, other Austronesian peoples

The Ivatan people are an Austronesian ethnolinguistic group native to the Batanes and Babuyan Islands of the northernmost Philippines. They are genetically closely related to other ethnic groups in Northern Luzon, but also share close linguistic and cultural affinities with the Tao people of Orchid Island in Taiwan.

The culture of the Ivatans is partly influenced by the environmental conditions of Batanes. Unlike the old-type nipa huts common in the Philippines, Ivatans have adopted their distinctive stone houses made of coral and limestone, designed to protect against the hostile climate.

== Origins ==
A 2011 genetic study has concluded that it is likely that the Batanes Islands were initially only used as "stepping stones" during the early stages of the maritime Austronesian expansion from Taiwan into the Philippine Islands (c. 3000 BCE). It was later re-colonized by Austronesians from northern Luzon at around 1200 BCE, which became the ancestors of the Ivatan people.

Archaeological excavations also reveal that the islands were part of the extensive trade in jade artifacts (lingling-o), a network that extended to Taiwan, Vietnam, Palawan, Luzon, and northern Borneo. The Ivatan also maintained close trade relationships and intermarried with the neighboring Tao people of Orchid Island in Taiwan.

The archaeological assemblages of Batanes can be divided into four distinct phases, with minor variation between islands. Phase 1 (2500 to 1000 BCE), is characterized by red-slipped and fine cord-marked pottery similar to the pottery assemblages of prehistoric Taiwan. Phase 2 (1300 BCE to 1 CE), is characterized by circle-stamped and red-slipped pottery that later also developed rectangular and "fishnet" designs. Phase 2 also features Fengtian nephrite sourced from Taiwan. Phase 3 (500 BC/1 CE to 1200 CE), is characterized by plain red-slipped pottery. Phase 4 (c. 1200 CE onwards), is characterized by imported pottery, indicating trade contacts with the Song and Yuan dynasties of China.

== History ==
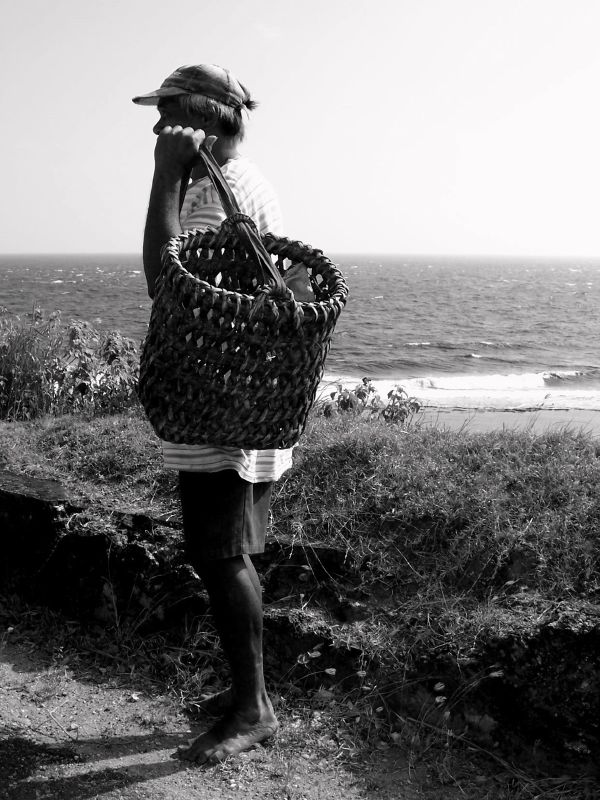
An Ivatan man fresh from work

On June 26, 1783, Batanes was incorporated into the Spanish East Indies. In 1786, Ivatans were forced to resettle in the lowlands of Batanes. The Ivatans lived under Spanish rule for 115 years and gained their independence on September 18, 1898. Be that as it may, June 6 is celebrated in Batanes as its founding day.

== Demographics ==
In 1990, the population of the Ivatans was 15,026, an increase of 24% over the 1980 population of 12,091. These were distributed to the six municipalities, with 38% residing in Basco, 23% in Itbayat, 12% in Sabtang, 11% in Mahatao and 8% each for Uyugan and Ivana. In the 2000 census, 15,834 Ivatans were among the 16,421 residents of Batanes.

Ivatans can be found in almost every part of the country as a minority, especially in Metro Manila, nearby Cagayan Valley (most specifically Cagayan), Cordillera Administrative Region, Central Luzon, Metro Manila, Calabarzon, Palawan and Mindanao particularly in Bukidnon, Lanao del Sur and Cotabato.

The mother tongue of the Ivatans is the Chirin nu Ibatan but is commonly known as Ivatan. A distinct Austronesian language, the Ivatan has two dialects including Basco, the Itbayáten, and possibly Tao. The Ivatans widely speak and understand the Ilocano (lingua franca of northern Luzon), Tagalog, and English languages. Ivatan residents of Mindanao and their descendants are also fluent speakers of Cebuano (majority language of large parts of Mindanao), Hiligaynon (main lingua franca of Soccsksargen) and various indigenous Mindanaoan languages in addition to their native language. However, the Ivatan language has been endangered, especially among newer generation of Ivatans born in Mindanao due to their assimilation into the Cebuano-speaking majority, with Cebuano is their main language with varying fluency in their ancestors' native language or none at all.

Today, most Ivatans are Catholics, like the rest of the country, although some have not converted and practice ancestral worship to their anitos. However, there are growing Protestant denominations especially in Basco, the capital town of Batanes.

== Culture ==
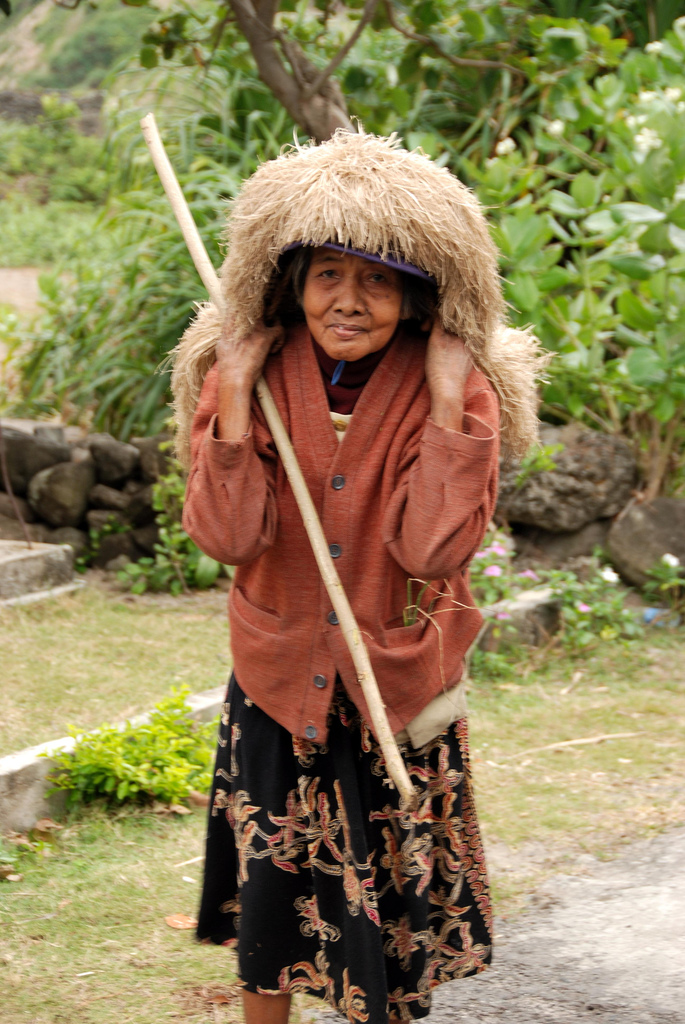
An Ivatan woman wearing a vakul made from vuyavuy palm fiber

The Ivatans’ culture has been largely influenced by the climate of Batanes. Due to severe climatic disruptions to their agriculture, Ivatans have developed numerous successful strategies to protect their food supply and way of life.

Traditionally, because of frequent typhoons and drought, they plant root crops able to cope with the environment. These crops include yam, sweet potato, taro, garlic, ginger, and onion, as they ensure higher chances of survival during awry climate conditions. The Ivatan study the behavior of animals, sky color, wind, and clouds to predict the weather. Ivatans usually gather their animals and stay in their houses when they see that the cows take shelter from the payaman (communal pasture) and birds taking refuge in houses or in the ground. A pink sky with an orange hue also heralds a storm.

The sea is vital to the Ivatan's way of life. They depend on the flying fish (dibang) and dolphinfish (arayu) present on the shores of Batanes in the months of March through May. They have a native delicacy called uvod (the pith of the banana stalk) which is served with the wine palek, on festive occasions such as weddings.

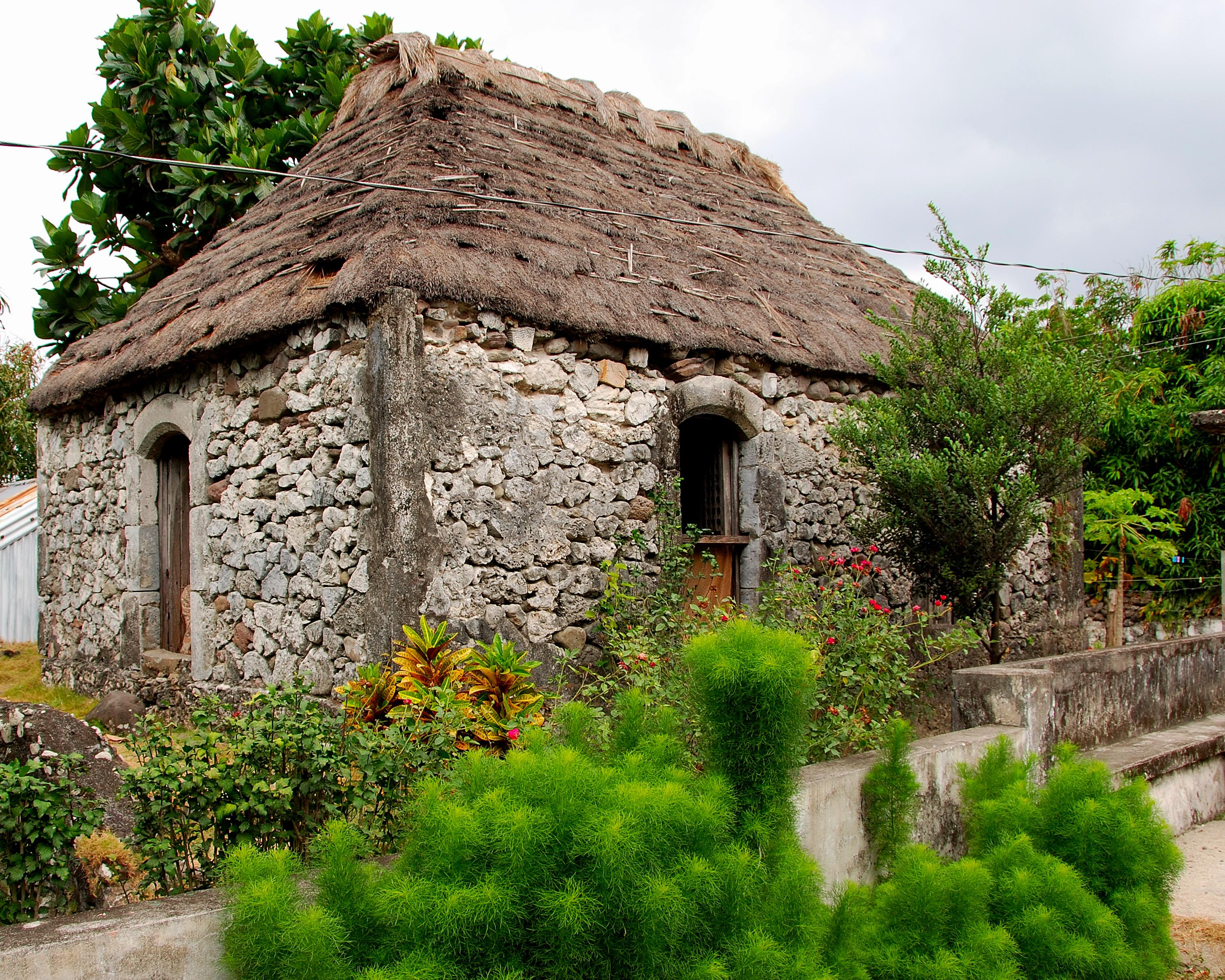
A Sinadumparan Ivatan house, one of the oldest structures in the Batanes islands. The house is made of limestone and coral and its roofing of cogon grass.

Before Spaniards arrived in the Philippines, Ivatans built their houses from cogon grass. These homes were small, well-situated, and designed to protect against strong winds. The Spaniards introduced large-scale production of lime to the Ivatan for the construction of their now-famous stone houses. Meter-thick limestone walls, are designed to protect against the harsh Batanes environment, which is known as a terminal passage of typhoons in the Philippines. The basic cogon grass is still preserved as roofs of their houses, thickly constructed to withstand strong winds. These houses are comparable to the white houses in New Zealand, Ireland, and the Scottish Highlands. Pre-colonial Ivatans also constructed fortified hills protected by sheer embankments known as ijang (or idjang).

One of the endemic garments of the Ivatans is the vakul. A vakul is headgear designed to protect the wearer from sun and rain. It is made from vuyavuy palm fiber.

The Ivatans have three folk song styles: the laji, the kanta, and the kalusan. The laji are ancient lyrical songs that are supposed to be sung when they are merry or just finished work. The kalusan is sung during work.

The Ivatan have legends that are called kabbata. They have the rawod, chants that chronicle the adventures of the Ivatan's forefathers as they escape a disaster.

== Indigenous Ivatan religion ==
=== Immortals ===
- Supreme Being: referred to as Mayo, in one account; probably regarded as remote as fear and meticulous ritual care are often related instead towards the Añitu
- Mayo: a fisherfolk hero who introduced the yuyus used to catch flying fishes called dibang, which are in turn used to catch the summertime fish arayu
- The Giver: the entity who provides all things; the souls of the upper-class travel to the beings' abode in heaven and become stars
- Añitu (cf. Anito): refers to the souls of the dead, place spirits, and wandering invisibles not identified nor tied down to any particular locale or thing
  - Añitu between Chavidug and Chavayan: place spirit Añitus who were reported to create sounds when the gorge between Chavidug and Chavayan were being created through dynamite explosions; believed to have shifted their residences after the construction of the passage
  - Rirryaw Añitu: place spirit Añitus who played music and sang inside a cave in Sabtang, while lighting up the fire; believed to have change residences after they were disturbed by a man
  - ji Rahet Añitu: a grinning place spirit Añitu who lived in an old tree; a man later cut the tree and found an earthen pot believed to have been owned by the Añitu
  - Nuvwan Añitu: good place spirit Añitus who saved a woman from a falling tree; they are offered rituals through the vivyayin
  - ji P'Supwan Añitu: good place spirit Añitus who became friends and allies of a mortal woman named Carmen Acido; sometimes taking in the form of dogs, they aided her and guided her in many of her tasks until her death from old age; despite their kindness towards Carmen, most people avoided the farm where they live
  - Mayavusay Añitu: place spirit Añitus living in a parcel of land in Mayavusay; sometimes take in the form of piglets, and can return cut vegetation parts into the mother vegetation
  - Cairn-dwelling Añitu: place spirit Añitus who lived in cairns and put a curse towards a man who destroyed their home; appearing as humans, the shaman Balaw conversed with them to right the wrong made by the man against their home
  - Mayuray Añitu: a wandering Añitu who expanded and was filled with darkness; encountered by a young boy who the spirit did not harm; referred to as a kapri, Añitus who walk around and grow as tall as the height for their surroundings
  - Dayanak Añitu: a type of very small Añitu with red eyes and gold ornaments; accepting their gold ornaments will cause misfortune

== Notable Ivatans ==
- Vicente Barsana, member of the Philippine Assembly from 1912 to 1916 and governor of Batanes from 1916 to 1917

== See also ==
- Ivatan language
- Batanes
- Tao people
- Gaddang people
- Ibanag people
- Tagalog people
- Kapampangan people
- Ilocano people
- Igorot people
- Pangasinan people
- Bicolano people
- Negrito
- Visayan people
  - Cebuano people
    - Boholano people
  - Hiligaynon people
  - Waray people
- Lumad
- Moro people
