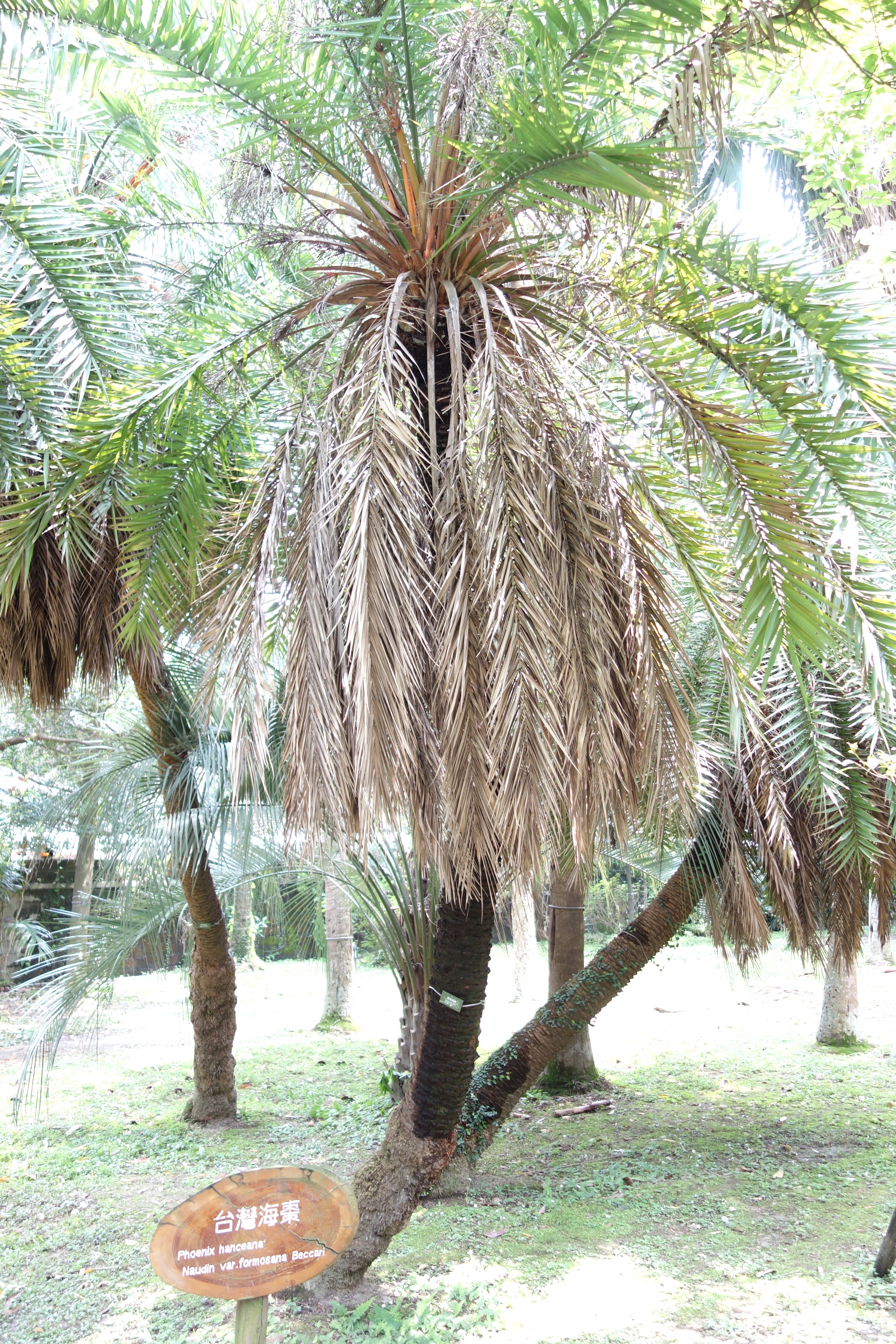

Scientific classification
- Kingdom: Plantae
- Clade: Tracheophytes
- Clade: Angiosperms
- Clade: Monocots
- Clade: Commelinids
- Order: Arecales
- Family: Arecaceae
- Genus: Phoenix
- Species: P. loureiroi

Binomial name
- Phoenix loureiroi Kunth

Synonyms
- Phoenix hanceana Naudin; Phoenix humilis Royle ex Becc. nom. illeg.; Phoenix ouseleyana Griff.; Phoenix pedunculata Griff.; Phoenix pusilla Lour. nom. illeg.; Phoenix pygmaea Raeusch. nom. inval.; Phoenix robusta (Becc.) Hook.f.

= Phoenix loureiroi =

Species of palm

Phoenix loureiroi (commonly known as the mountain date palm, vuyavuy palm, or voyavoy palm,) is a species of flowering plant in the palm family, indigenous to southern Asia, from the Philippines, Taiwan, India, southern Bhutan, Burma, Thailand, Cambodia, Vietnam, Pakistan, and China. It occurs in deciduous and evergreen forests and in clear terrain from sea level to 1,500 m (4,900 ft) altitude.

Phoenix loureiroi is named after João de Loureiro; it was originally written by Kunth as "loureirii", but this is error be corrected to loureiroi under the provisions of the ICBN.

== Description ==
Phoenix loureiroi contains solitary and clustering plants with trunks from 1–4 m (3.3–13 ft) high and 25 cm (9.8 in) in width, usually covered in old leaf bases. The leaves vary to some degree but usually reach 2 m (6.6 ft) in length with leaflets wide at the base and sharply pointed apices. The leaflets emerge from the rachis at varying angles creating a stiff, plumose leaf.

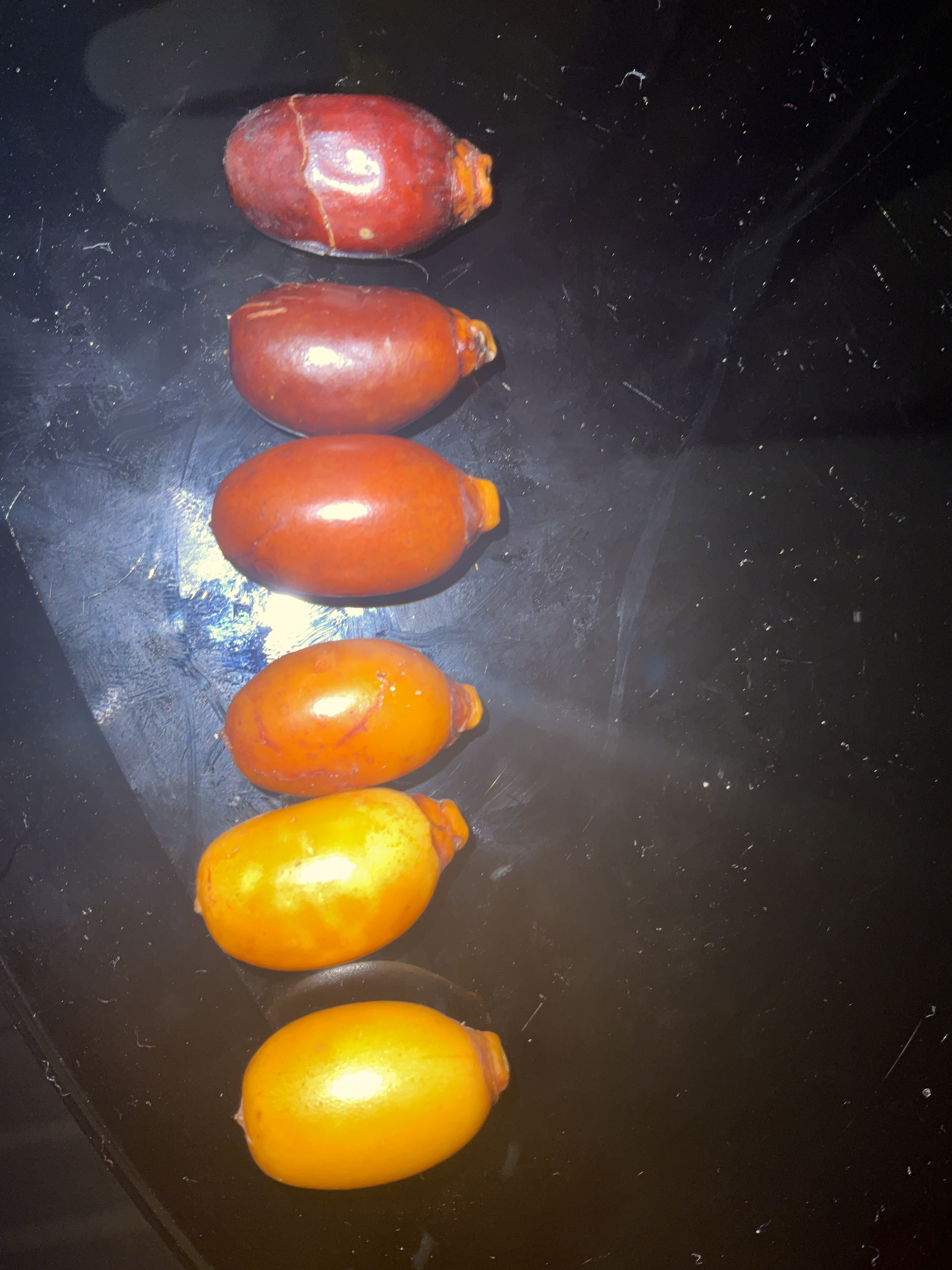
Phoenix Loureiloi fruits ripening stages

The fruit is a single-seeded drupe, bluish-black when ripe, produced on erect, yellow inflorescences, usually hidden within the leaf crown. The species is noted for its variability in different habitats.

== Varieties ==
There are two varieties, based on the presence or absence of sclerotic, tannin-filled cells along the midribs and margins of leaflets:

- Phoenix loureiroi var. loureiroi.
- Phoenix loureiroi var. pedunculata (Griff.) Govaerts (syn. P. loureiroi var. humilis S.C.Barrow).

== Cultural importance ==
Fibers from P. loureiroi var. loureiroi, known locally as "vuyavuy palm" (also spelled "voyavoy"), are used to make the distinctive vakul headgear and kanayi vests of the Ivatan people in the Batanes Islands of the northern Philippines.
