= Marriage and wedding customs in the Philippines =

Tradition in Philippines

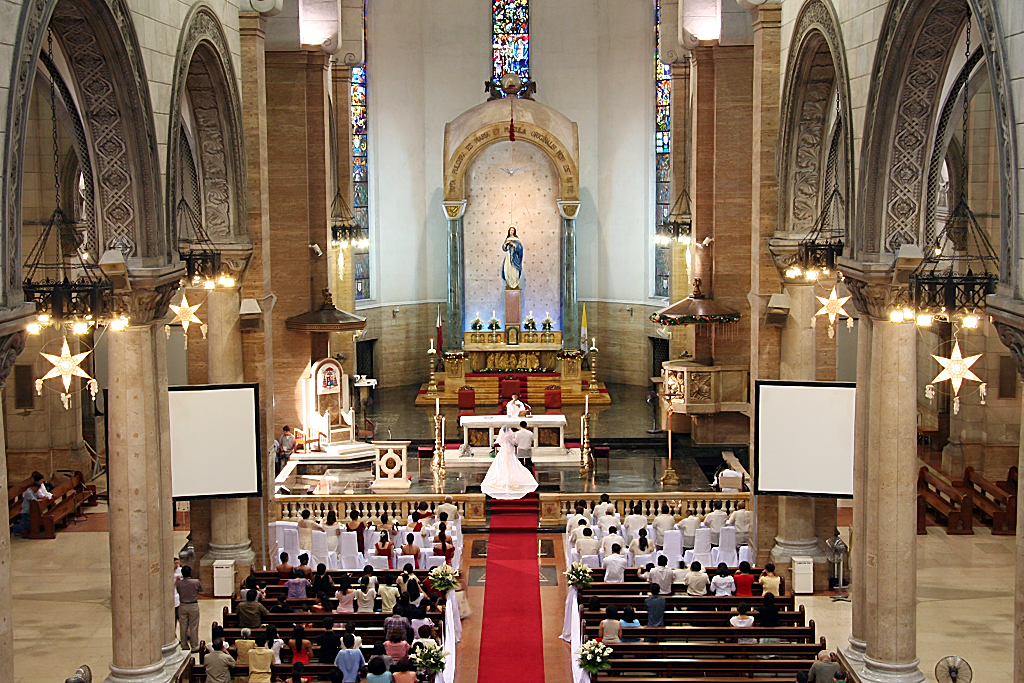
A Filipino wedding held in December at the Manila Cathedral in the Philippines.

Traditional marriage customs in the Philippines and Filipino wedding practices pertain to the characteristics of marriage and wedding traditions established and adhered by them Filipino men and women in the Philippines after a period of adoption courtship and engagement. These traditions extend to other countries around the world where Filipino communities exist. Kasalan is the Filipino word for "wedding", while its root word – kasal – means "marriage". The present-day character of marriages and weddings in the Philippines were primarily influenced by the permutation of Christian, both Catholic and Protestant, Hindu, Islam, Chinese, Spanish, and American models.

== Historical overview ==
A typical Filipino wedding in pre-colonial times, is held for three days, and was officiated by a babaylan, a tribal priest or priestess. The house of the babaylan was the ritual venue for the nuptials. On the first day, the couple was brought to the priest's home, where the babaylan blessed them as their hands were joined over a container of uncooked rice. On the second day, the priest would prick their chests to draw some blood, which is then collected in a container to be mixed with water. After declaring their love for each other three times, the couple were fed by the priest with cooked rice from a single container. Afterwards, they were to drink the water mixed with their combined blood. The priest proclaimed that the couple were officially wed once their necks and hands were bound by a cord or, sometimes, their long hairs were entwined. In lieu of a babaylan, the reigning datu of the place or a local elder may also officiate.

After the ceremony, a series of gift-giving rituals were also done to counter any negative signals from the bride: refusal to ascend the stairs to her new home; denies to participate in the marriage banquet; or enter the bridal chamber.

Spanish colonialism brought changes to these marriage rituals because of the proselytising by Spanish missionaries, which began in the late 16th century. As a result, the majority of modern Filipino weddings became predominantly Catholic or generally Christian in character, as the Catholic Church remains the predominant religion. Indigenous traditions still exist today in other regions of the Philippines. Parts of Filipino wedding ceremonies have become faith-centered and God-centered, which also highlights the concept that the union of two individuals is a "life long commitment" of loving and caring. Culturally, the marriage does not only signify the union of two persons, but also of their families and extended clans.

== Requirements ==
The following are the legal requirements that must be met in order to marry in the Philippines. Specific requirements for marriage are detailed in Title I of the Family Code of the Philippines. Some of these requirements are:

- Legal capacity of the contracting parties who must be a male and a female, 25 years old and above without any impediment to get married.
- Consent freely given in the presence of the solemnizing officer.
- Authority of the solemnizing officer (only incumbent member of the judiciary; priest, rabbi, imam, or minister of any church or religious sect duly authorized by his church or religious sect and registered with the civil registrar general; ship captain or airplane chief, military commander of a unit to which a chaplain is assigned, in the absence of the latter, during a military operation only in marriages at the point of death; and consul-general, consul or vice-consul only between Filipino citizens abroad are authorized by law to solemnize marriage). Article 35(2) of the Family Code, however, specifies that marriages solemnized by any person not legally authorized to perform marriages which were contracted with either or both parties believing in good faith that the solemnizing officer had the legal authority to do so are neither void nor voidable.

In cases where parental consent or parental advice is needed, marriage law in the Philippines also requires couples to attend a seminar on family planning before the wedding day in order to become responsible for family life and parenthood. The seminar is normally conducted at a city hall or a municipal council.

Some officiating ministers or churches require the couple to present a Certificate of No Marriage Record (CENOMAR), on top of or together with the marriage license and the authority of the solemnizing officer. The CENOMAR can be secured from the Philippine Statistics Authority or its designated sub-offices and branches.

== Marriage proposal ==
The traditional marriage proposal takes the form of the pamanhikan or pamamanhikan or the "parental marriage proposal", a formal way of asking the parents of the woman for her hand. The would-be groom and his parents go to the would-be bride's home, and ask the parents for their consent. Once the woman's parents accept the proposal, other matters will be discussed during this meeting including among other things, the wedding plan, the date, the finances, and the list of guests. The expenses for the wedding are generally shouldered by the groom and his family. The practice of performing paninilbihan, paying dowry, visiting a shrine to pray for fertility, etc. are among strong traces of continuity of Hindu influence in Philippines.

Pamamanhikan enforces the importance of the familial nature of the wedding, as traditionally a marriage is the formation of an alliance between two clans as well as the joining of individuals. This is sometimes further expressed in how the whole extended family goes with the groom and his parents, using the occasion as a chance to meet and greet the other clan. In this situation, there is a feast held at the bride's family home.

This event is separate from the Despedida de Soltera (Spanish: "Farewell to Single-hood") party some families have before the wedding. The local variant of the Hispanic custom normally holds it for the bride, and it is held by her family. It is similar in sentiment to the hen night, albeit a more wholesome and formal version.

== Wedding announcement ==
After the pamamanhikan, the couple performs the pa-alam or "wedding announcement visitations." In this custom, the couple goes to the homes of relatives to inform the latter of their status as a couple and the schedule of their nuptial. It is also during these visits when the couple personally delivers their wedding invitations.

== Wedding date and invitation ==
The typical Filipino wedding invitation contains the date and venue for the wedding ceremony and for the wedding reception, as well as the names and roles of the principal sponsors of the bride. Weddings in the Philippines are commonly held during the month of June.

== Ceremonial protocol ==
=== Bride ===
The bride's attire is typically a custom-made white wedding gown and veil. This is from the Anglo-American influence of dressing the woman in white on her wedding day. A popular alternative is a white version of the Baro't saya, a form of national dress for Filipino women.

=== Groom ===
The groom is traditionally clothed in the barong tagalog, the formal and traditional transparent, embroidered, button-up shirt made from jusi (also spelled as husi) fabric made from pineapple fibers. This formal Filipino men's dress is worn untucked with a white t-shirt or singlet underneath, and commonly worn together with a black pair of trousers.

=== Wedding guests ===
Males guests typically wear the Filipino Barong, or a suit. Women wear a formal or semi-formal dress, the length and color determined by the wedding theme.

It is discouraged for female guests to wear white since this competes with the bride's traditional wedding dress color. For Chinese Filipino weddings, it is customary for the bride to wear red. It is frowned upon to wear this color as a guest, for the same reason.

Black and white ensembles are also considered impolite in traditional Chinese Filipino weddings. These colors symbolize death and mourning, and are deemed to have no places in a festive celebration like weddings. However, using these as accents is acceptable.

=== Wedding ceremony ===
Generally, the wedding ceremony proper includes the celebration of an hour-long Mass or religious service. The groom arrives an hour earlier than the bride for the purpose of receiving guests at the church or venue. The groom could be waiting with his parents; the bride will arrive later with her father and mother on board a wedding car. Afterwards, the wedding party assembles to enter the church for the processional. During the nuptials, Catholic and Aglipayan brides customarily bear an ornate, heirloom rosary along with their bridal bouquet. Throwing the rice over bride and groom for prosperity and placing of sampaguita garland around the neck are continuing pre-Spanish Hindu influence in Philippines, even the term "asawa" for spouse is of Indian origin.

==== Ceremonial sponsors, witnesses, and participants ====
The principal wedding sponsors (also termed "godparents," "special sponsors," "primary sponsors," "counselors," or "witnesses"), are often chosen by the betrothed, sometimes on advice of their families. Multiple pairs of godparents are customary, with six godmothers (ninang) and six godfathers (ninong)

==== Ritual objects ====
Ceremonial paraphernalia in Filipino weddings include the arrhae, the candles, the veils, the cord, and wedding rings. The ring bearer acts as the holder and keeper of the rings until the exchanging of rings is performed, while the coin bearer acts as the holder and keeper of the arrhae until it is offered and given by the groom to his bride. Among the secondary sponsors or wedding attendants, three pairs – each pair consists of a male and a female secondary sponsor – are chosen to light the wedding candles, handle the veils, and place the cord.

===== Rings and arrhae =====
After the exchange of wedding rings by the couple, the groom gives the wedding arrhae to his bride. The arrhae is a symbol of his "monetary gift" to the bride because it is composed of 13 pieces of gold, or silver coins, a "pledge" that the groom is devoted to the welfare and well-being of his wife and future offspring. Both rings and arrhae are blessed first by the priest during the wedding.

===== Candles =====
Candle Sponsors are secondary sponsors who light the pair of candles, one on each side of the couple. For Christians, this embodies the presence of God in the union. An old folk belief holds that should one of the candles go out during the rite, the person beside it will die ahead of the other.

Many weddings add the ritual of the "unity candle", which signifies the joining of their two families. The couple takes the two lighted candles and together lights a single candle. For Christians, lighting this single candle symbolizes the inclusion of Christ into their life as a married couple. The practice is rooted in American Protestantism, and is sometimes discouraged by Catholic parishes for theological reasons.

===== Veils =====
After the candle ritual, a pair of secondary sponsors known as the Veil Sponsors will pin the veil(s) on the couple. The veiling ritual signifies the clothing of the two individuals as one.

Two variants of this custom exist: a long, white, rectangular veil is draped over the shoulder of the groom and above the bride's head; two smaller veils may also be pinned on the groom and bride's shoulders.

===== Cord =====
After the veiling, the last pair of secondary sponsors will then drape the yugal over the shoulders of the couple. The cord is customarily shaped or looped to form the figure "8" (a lucky number; the figure is also interpreted as the infinity symbol), to symbolize "everlasting fidelity." Each loop of the cord is placed around the individual collar areas of the bride and the groom.

Apart from silk, popular materials used to make the wedding cord are strings of flowers, links of coins, or a chain designed like a long, double rosary.

===== Bible =====
Catholic and Protestant weddings include entrusting to the couple a copy of the Bible.

=== Wedding reception ===
During the wedding reception, it is typical to release a pair of white male and female doves, symbolizing marital harmony and peace. These are placed in a cage or receptacle, which can be opened by pulling ribbons or cords or manually opened and released by the couple themselves. After their release from their cage, the person who catches them may take them home to rear as pets.

It is also a common practice to have the "Money Dance." This is where the bride and groom dance to slow music while the guests pin money (notes) on the couple. The monetary gift from the dance is a way to help the new couple get started with their married life.

Tossing the bouquet is for the most part uncommon for the bride to do, though it is increasingly being observed by younger women. Instead, the bride traditionally offers it at a side altar of the church before an image of either the Blessed Virgin Mary or a patron saint, or offers it at the grave of an important relative or ancestor.

== Filipino Muslim wedding ==
The various Muslim groups follow the tradition of the Nikah or marriage contract, and Walima or post-marriage reception. These are followed in line with universal Islamic rules and customs, such as gender segregation and presence of an Islamic scholar or an Imam.

Individual regional and ethnic customs are also added to the wedding in line with local customs, and these differ depending on whether the marriage is done by Bangsamoro groups (the traditionally Muslim groups of the Southern Philippines), or by Balik Islam Filipinos (relatively recent reverts to Islam from the Christian-majority groups in Luzon and the Visayas).

=== Bangsamoro weddings ===
Among the Bangsamoro groups, marriage includes a variety of rich, diverse and old traditions that predate the coming of Islam and have been modified in order to adhere to Islamic belief and sharia. These bear some similarity to native traditions seen in other parts of Southeast Asia, China, and further afield in the Indian subcontinent. Below the two cultural divides within the Bangsamoro, the Mindanaon groups and the Sulu groups, are represented. The Sangir people of Saranggani island follow their own traditions similar to their Indonesian kin on Sangir island near to Mindanao, and these differ from the traditions below.

==== Mindanaon Muslim Marriages ====
For the Maranao, Maguindanao, Iranun, and Kaagan of Mindanao island itself, the wedding celebration is referred to by the generic term used for feasts: Kalilang.

The kalilang features several sections. The first is the parade from the house of the grooms family to the house of the brides family or alternatively to the mosque. This is accompanied by a retinue of musicians and male dancers dancing the sagayan dance, which was used to deter the evil ones from among the jinn from disrupting or damaging the wedding’s proceedings.

The second governs the nikah, which follows the Islamic tradition. This follows the generic pattern in that the groom, his father, and the father of the bride meet with the imam and after several recitations of the Quran and Arabic lectures traced to what Muhammad said were uttered, advice given on how the groom is to ensure an Islamic marriage, the verbal marriage contract is agreed upon and a prayer is said. The bride is nowhere in the actual contract agreement, and is usually hidden behind a veil in her own bedroom, attended upon by her retinue (female relatives who dress her, put on make up, veil her completely, and packs her belongings and wealth with her to take to the grooms house). Once the nikah is formalized, the groom goes to collect the bride. This signals the end of the formal marriage.

After this stage, the kalilang itself (feast or reception) begins. An agong may or may not be sounded to announce the marriage is complete and the walima or reception is to begin,

The kalilang itself can be held in a marquee or hired hall. Sometimes it is held in an opening in the village for all the community to attend. Food will have been cooked from early that morning in anticipation of the walima, and the aim would always be to feed as many people or attendees as possible in order for Allah to Bestow blessings on the family and the bride and groom. The idea of charity or sadaqah is central to Islam, and this has been incorporated into the kalilang over the centuries too.

A kambayoka (who is a professional hereditary arts and poetry person, charged with remembering family histories and the line of sultans) will usually chant favourites from traditional sagas and epics like the darangen. These chants are called bayok, and are essential to any kalilang. Modern kambayoka are accompanied by a guitar or kutiyapi although traditionally the only accompaniment allowed was a stick beating time against a wall, table, or bronze serving tray.

A kulintang ensemble will usually play well known compositions and this is the traditional musical accompaniment during the kalilang itself while all attendees eat. A dance group may be hired too, with favourites being the singkil among the Maranao, kapag-asik and silong sa ganding dances at Maguindanao, Iranun and Kaagan kalilang. Some weddings now include the guitar based vocal joust between a male and female singer called dayunday and others the pangalay or pakiring which are influences from Sulu archipelago weddings.

==== Pagkawin ====
In the Sulu archipelago and southern Palawan, the marriage traditions of the Tausug, Yakan, Sama-Bajau and Jama Mapun differ greatly from those of Mindanaon Muslims. The generic name for marriage is this area is called Pagkawin. The pagkawin includes several sections which differ from those of Mindanaon Muslims.

The Tausug and Sama peoples’ wedding starts the night before the nikah. A musical troupe and special ensemble called gabbang-biola or gabbang would start playing to a crowd of attendees, and this would happen for any portion of the night from the end of the Isha prayer to the Subuh prayer. The gabbang performance includes flirty and humorous content, spontaneously done and improvised. Two women play the gabbang xylophone, and 2 male performers play the violin or fiddle. The gabbang performance represents one of the only times men and women are seen performing with each other, an exception in usually gender-segregated communities.

The next morning in the same way as that of the Mindanaon groups, a procession of the groom and his retinue will occur up to the home of the bride, or to the local mosque. Historically the clothing worn by the groom would point to his wealth, with hajji (those who had undertaken the hajj pilgrimage to Makkah) wearing the Arab thawb or “barong mahaba” and the white checkered ghutra typical of Saudi Arabia. Similarly, an OFW groom would wear clothes or designer goods from the country he was working in. In the past, those of the nobility would ride on horseback. Horses are animals very rarely seen otherwise on these small islands.

The nikah itself resembles other Muslim weddings in its solemnity, but differs from Mindanaon and conservative Muslim groups by the presence of the bride, along with her father and the groom and father of the groom, and imam.

After the standard recitations from the Quran and prayers the actual contract is made by the groom and father of the bridge pressing one thumb and one toe against each other, while sitting, with the imam seated in between. Once the agreement has been made, the father of the bridge and the groom position their thumbs so that either the father of the bride or imam guides the groom to put his thumb into the forehead of the bride, or the groom does this alone, after making several circular motions around her head (3 times). This specific gesture harkens back to the Hindu marriages, and the puja or blessing (also seen in Balinese weddings) seen in the preislamized Sulu archipelago. Sulu and Mindanao was predominantly Hindu-Buddhist before becoming predominantly Muslim in the 14th century, and this part of the nikah shows a glimpse of this, albeit heavily islamized.

The last part of the wedding is also the walimah, reception. As in Mindanaon and other Southeast Asian Muslim wedding receptions, the bride and groom sit on a stage in view of the performers and attendees, who sit on tables below the stage. This is to emulate being a royal couple or sultan and dayang dayang for a day. Traditionally the bride and groom are meant to keep a sad or blank expression, to show that they are taking the burden of Islamic marriage seriously and are only marrying as part of their familial and Islamic duties, and not for merriment or love.

Lots of food is prepared for the wedding, and is shared among all guests as part of sadaqah.

Kulintangan music is traditionally played for at least a portion of the proceedings, as well as performances of kissa and or salsila or chants from local legend, sultanate history or historic Islamic events. Pangadji, which are Islamic prayers and recitations of the Quran the local tone or native melodic voice, also are recited. Later in the walimah the pangalay or igal dance would be performed to raise money for the bride and groom. In modern weddings, the more jolly pakiring dance is performed instead, or dance and music troupes with synthesisers are hired to handle the entertainment and dancing. Some songs that are popular during Tausug wedding pangalay/pakiring dances include Lolay, Daling-daling, and a variation of the generic Filipino folk song “Planting rice”.

== Same sex marriage ==
Marriage between couples of the same sex is currently not possible under the laws of the Philippines because, according to the Filipino Family Code, both family and marriage are considered as heterosexual units. The legal concept of a family in the Philippines does not incorporate homosexual relationships. Furthermore, finding that a party to the marital union is homosexual is a ground for annulment of the marriage and legal separation in the Philippines, which leads to the severance of the homosexual individual's spousal inheritance, claims to any conjugal property, and the custody of offspring.

== Pre-colonial Wedding customs ==
Filipinos have pre-colonial customs based on the Indian Hindu wedding that are related to marriage and weddings and still carried out even after colonial masters destroyed other customs after the imposition of Christianity.

Pre-colonial customs include the groom or bride avoiding travel beforehand to prevent accidents from happening. The bride must not wear pearls as these are similar to tears, and a procession of men holding bolos and musicians playing agongs must be done. This march was also done after the ceremony until the newly-wed couple reaches their abode. The purpose of this procession is similar to the current practice of breaking plates during the wedding reception, in order to dispel bad luck.

Spanish colonizers introduced new beliefs to the Philippines, with particular concern over banning activities that may cause broken marriages, sadness and regret. Wedding gowns cannot be worn in advance, as any black-coloured clothing during the ceremony, and sharp objects such as knives cannot be given as gifts.

Other beliefs include a typhoon on the wedding day being an ill omen; that after the ceremony the bride should walk ahead of her husband or step on his foot to prevent being dominated by him; and an accidentally dropped ring, veil, or arrhae will cause marital misery.

Superstitious beliefs on good fortune include showering the married couple with uncooked rice, as this wishes them a prosperous life together. The groom's arrival at the venue ahead of his bride also diminishes dire fate. In addition, a single woman who will follow the footsteps of a newly married couple may enhance her opportunity to become a bride herself.

Siblings are not permitted to marry within the calendar year as this is considered bad luck. The remedy to this belief, called sukob, is to have the one marrying later pass through the back entrance of the church instead of its main doors. Bride and groom cannot have marital relations starting from the 60th day prior to the wedding.

== See also ==
- Sexuality in the Philippines
  - Single mother phenomenon of Philippines
  - LGBT culture in the Philippines
  - LGBT rights in the Philippines
- Philippine legal codes
  - Civil Code of the Philippines
  - Divorce in the Philippines
- Religion in the Philippines
  - Christian views on marriage
  - Catholic marriage
  - Marriage and wedding customs in Islam
  - Islamic marital jurisprudence
