= La Bulaqueña =

1895 painting by Juan Luna

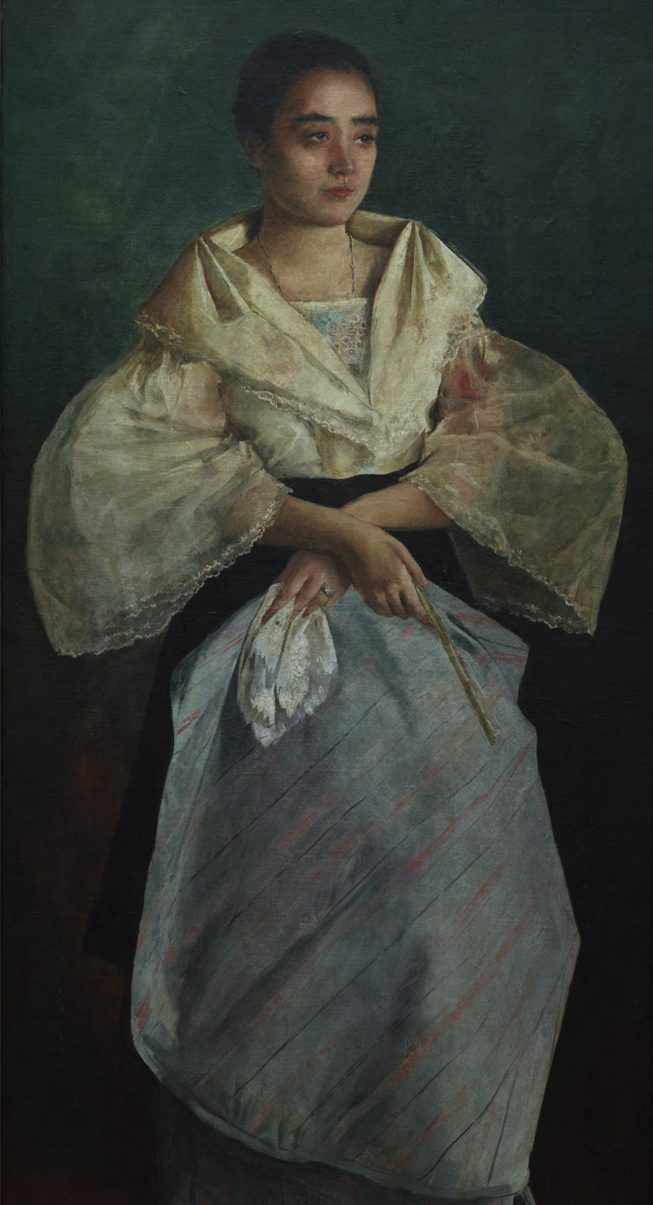
- Artist: Juan Luna
- Year: 1895
- Medium: Oil on canvas
- Location: National Museum of Fine Arts

La Bulaqueña, literally "the woman from Bulacan" or "the Bulacan woman", also sometimes referred to as Una Bulaqueña ("a woman from Bulacan"), is the Spanish title of an 1895 painting by Filipino painter and revolutionary activist Juan Novicio Luna. Bulacan is a province in the Philippines in Luzon island and its residents are called Bulaqueños, also spelled as Bulakenyos (Bulakenyo for men and Bulakenya for women) in the Filipino language. It is a "serene portrait", of a Filipino woman wearing a María Clara gown, a traditional Filipino dress that is composed of four pieces, namely the camisa, the saya (long skirt), the pañuelo (neck cover), and the tapis (knee-length overskirt). The name of the dress is an eponym to María Clara, the mestiza heroine of Filipino hero José Rizal's novel Noli Me Tangere (Latin for "Touch Me Not"). The woman's clothing in the painting is the reason why the masterpiece is alternately referred to as María Clara. It is one of the few canvases done by Luna illustrating Filipino culture. The painting is permanently displayed at the National Museum of Fine Arts, and was on loan at the Louvre Abu Dhabi from June 2025 until the following year.

== History ==
The painting was created by Juan Luna from November 1895 to the first months of 1896. It was sold to the National Museum of the Philippines during World War II for 200 Japanese military notes.

In June 2025, the painting was sent to the United Arab Emirates on loan for a one-year exhibition at the Louvre Abu Dhabi. In August 2025, the museum released limited-edition beep cards featuring the painting.

== Identity of the woman ==
Filipino art experts, historians, and researchers have four theories on the identity of the sitter in Luna's La Bulaqueña despite the lack of any photographs. According to Emilio Aguilar Cruz, a columnist for the Philippine Daily Globe newspaper, the woman in the portrait could be a woman Luna had courted after losing his wife Paz Pardo de Tavera. Luna accidentally killed his wife and mother-in-law because of jealousy. The woman could also be the same as one courted by Juan Luna's brother, Antonio Luna. Two existing references suggested that it was the daughter of a prominent Filipino family who Luna was not able to marry or, as mentioned earlier, a woman wooed by Luna's brother, Antonio. The two books suggested that the woman was one of the daughters of Doña Mariquita Sabas who lived in 2 Espeleta Street, Binondo, Manila, a place frequented by Luna and his brother Antonio for tertulia gatherings. Doña Sabas had two daughters: Dolores (nicknamed “Loleng”) and Francisca (“Paquita”), and the former is believed to be the woman in the painting.

However, according to Rosalinda Orosa, the owner of Luna's other painting, the Tampuhan, the woman could be Emiliana Trinidad, the mother of Orosa's sister-in-law and the same woman who sat for Luna's Tampuhan. Orosa's claim prevailed as there are existing photographs of Emiliana Trinidad.

According to Dr. Asunción N. Fernando, the woman could be her grandmother María "Iyang" Rodrigo Fernando, who assisted in the cause of the Katipunan. María Rodrigo Fernando was a supplier of food and courier of messages to Katipuneros hiding in the fields outside her hometown. Historian Antonio Valeriano noted that the woman in the portrait has similar facial features to the Rodrigo, including “bushy eyebrows and sad eyes”, such as those of Francisco "Soc" Rodrigo. Belén Ponferrada of the Malacañan Palace Museum agrees with the findings of the research regarding the woman's possible identity. However, inconsistencies arise in this story because the timeline does not align.
