= Sexuality in the Philippines =

Although Westernization and globalization have influenced Filipinos who live in the metropolitan areas, the overall culture remains quite conservative in its sexual values. Filipino sexuality is affected by education received from schools, the media, the rise of the internet, religious teachings from their churches or other similar spiritual institutions, legal policies and laws, and the influence of urbanization or urbanized regions in the Philippines. There are provisions and policies in the constitution of the Philippines which promulgates that the sexual act should happen only within the framework of married life between a man and woman, because this personal human expression is solidly connected to the family unit and to society as a whole.

As a predominantly Christian country, the Philippines considers that the only sexual behavior morally and legally acceptable and appropriate is heterosexual intercourse within a monogamous marriage, with the exception of polygamous marriage as practiced by some Filipino minority groups and by Muslim communities in the Mindanao, southern, and southwestern regions of the Philippines, as long as the men of these population are financially capable of supporting their multiple wives.

== Core ideas and main influences ==
Nonmarital sexual behavior, such as pornography and prostitution, are banned (by articles 201 and 202 of the Revised Penal Code, respectively). Although considered morally inappropriate, quiet homosexuality and heterosexual cohabitation have become socially accepted to a certain degree. Homosexuality is legal in the Philippines, however the idea of legalizing same-sex marriage remains the subject of debate by "both Church and State".

Furthermore, the Roman Catholic Church is the primary influence in legal, political, and religious views of sexuality, birth control and contraception, abortion, education (including sex education, sexual roles of men and women, and homosexuality) and other aspects of civil life in Philippine society. Among the views of the Catholic Church include that premarital sex and masturbation are immoral behaviors, and that homosexuality – similar to the form of Catholicism introduced by the Spanish missionaries – is an abnormal human conduct.

One of the general pronouncements for the majority of Filipinos is that men should choose to marry virgin women and that women should keep and maintain their virginity until marriage. However, there are some tribal Filipino communities who permit young men and women to engage in sexual activities beginning from the stage of puberty.

== Historical perspective ==
=== Indigenous culture ===
Before the arrival of the first group of Spaniards in the Philippine islands on the shores of Cebu, under the leadership of Ferdinand Magellan in 1521, the ancient native Filipinos already had their own sexual and relationship practices. One of them is the carrying out of polygamy. Early Filipino tribal men had five or more wives, a marital ethnic norm of the archipelago at the time.

Ancient unmarried Filipino women were encouraged by their cultural orientation at the time to participate freely in sexual activities. According to Antonio Pigafetta and Friar Juan de Plasencia, as explained by Stanley Karnow in his book, In Our Image: America's Empire in the Philippines and in The Body Book by Fe Maria C. Arriola, apart from penile piercing through the use of rods made of tin or gold with dimension similar to a goose-quill which may or may not have pointed spurs, the men were also using other penile adornments such as the sagra and an item known in Tagalog as pilik-mata ng kambing or "goat's eyelashes".

Pigafetta further described that there were adornments that are similar to the size of a cart nail, and that the middle section of the rod had a hole to facilitate urination. During sexual intercourse, the top of the spur – while attached to the penis – was smoothly introduced first into the woman's vagina, followed by the bottom portion. Once the penis becomes stiff, the rod or bolt stayed firmly, and cannot be withdrawn from the female's sex organ until the penis becomes flaccid.

=== 20th century ===
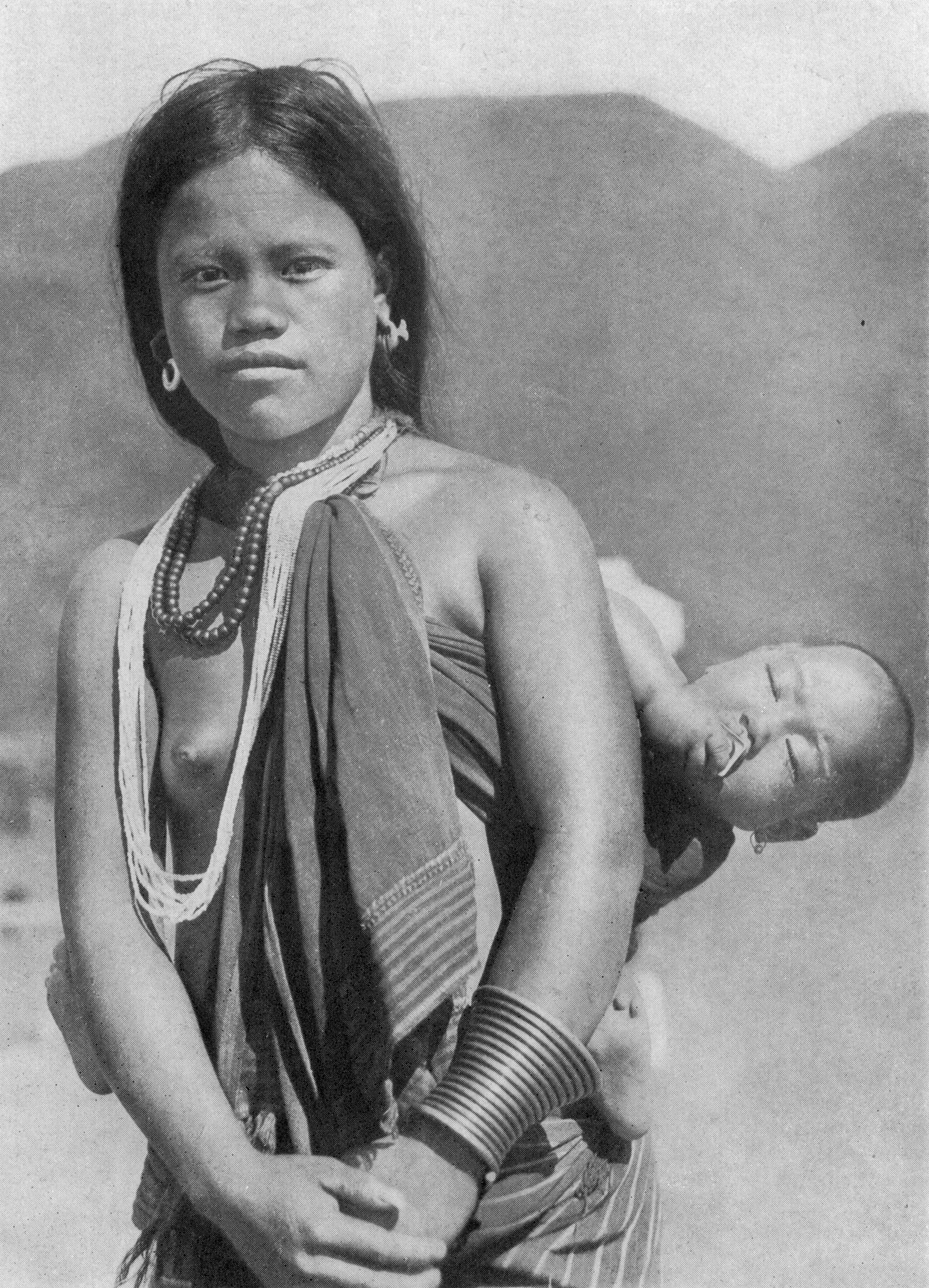
A 1917 photograph of an Ifugao mother and her son

In addition to this, about one thousand years ago, the Filipino Ifugao people of northern central Philippines already had well-established values regarding marriage and sexuality. An example of these is their custom of equating the size of a woman's breast and the wideness of her hips with the price of the dowry.

In 10th-century Philippines, the Chinese Limahong already introduced the concept of monogamy to ancient Filipinos, as exemplified in the cultural practices of the Ifugaos, the Negritos, and the Igorots. These Filipino ethnic communities also permitted marriages between girls and boys who have reached the age of puberty.

Filipino historian Ambeth R. Ocampo described that during 19th-century Philippines the sexually attractive female body parts of the time were the "bare arms, a good neck or nape" and "tiny rosy feet". This is exemplified by Ocampo's chosen passages from Soledad Lacson-Locsin's unabridged English-language translation of the 25th chapter of Jose Rizal's Spanish-language novel, the Noli Me Tangere:

"At last, Maria Clara emerged from the bath accompanied by her friends, fresh as a rose opening its petals with the first dew, covered with sparks of fire from the early morning sun. Her first smile was for Crisostomo (Ibarra), and the first cloud on her brow for Padre Salvi..." (Padre Salvi, although a priest, is an admirer of Maria Clara.) "Their legs were up to the knees, the wide folds of their bathing skirts outlining the gracious curves of their thighs. Their hair hung loose and their arms were bare. They wore striped gay-colored blouses... Pale and motionless, the religious Actaeon (i.e. Padre Salvi, who was hiding in the bushes, acting as a voyeur) watched this chaste Diana (i.e. Maria Clara): his sunken eyes glistening at the sight of her beautifully molded white arms, the graceful neck ending in a suggestion of a bosom. The diminutive rosy feet playing in the water aroused strange sensations and feelings in his impoverished, starved being and made him dream of new visions in his fevered mind."

=== Spanish Catholic influence ===
As a part of the process of converting ancient native Filipinos into Catholicism, the Spaniard missionaries forbade the use of penile instruments, and promoted Christian ideas of the wife's fidelity to her husband, premarital virginity, the notion of a woman's role as a "nurturing mother", and the reverence of the Virgin Mary.

=== American Protestant influence ===
After 1898, Protestants from the United States brought and shared their attitudes on sexuality with the people of the Philippines, which were based on the doctrines of Judaism and Protestant Christianity. The branching out of this American-introduced Protestantism led to the establishment of similar restrictions and rules regarding sexuality as imposed by the Filipino founders of the Philippine Independent Church and the Iglesia ni Cristo or "Church of Christ".

== Sex education in the Philippines ==
Prior to 1969, sex education in the Philippines was non-existent. Instructions were limited only to discussions on pregnancy and childcare within the confines of the family unit, specifically between female members of the home. Outside the family or the home setting, available informal information – in the form of television and radio programs, illegal adult or sex publications, and the like – was imprecise, flawed, or deficient.

=== 1960s ===
After the World Health Organization and the Philippine government's introduction of programs on family planning and birth/conception control in 1969, suburban and rural Philippine communities received training in these programs, with instructions on basic biology, pregnancy, and contraception that focused on the use of birth control pills. This program was clandestinely sustained by the Roman Catholic Church to "reduce the family's burden of child rearing because of poverty".

=== 1970s ===
In 1970, Philippine high schools and colleges began to include teachings related to public health, sexually transmitted diseases, and limited information on human reproduction and human sexuality in the curriculum for science courses, such as biology. The limitation was truncated by the Filipino tradition of not explicitly mentioning or showing images of the male and female sex organs even for educational purposes.

In 1972, the government of Ferdinand Marcos formally offered sexual education programs at all levels of education. Human sexual development and population were topics in science and biology subjects in elementary schools.

High school students received elementary and basic-level of biological information and family planning, with emphasis that separation and divorce are illegal in the Philippines. Information about legal separation or de facto separation were also taught in Philippine public schools due to its high incidence of occurrence in lower-class families.

=== 1980s ===
During the 1980s, seminars and international conferences were held by schools of medicine as an addition to ongoing courses on human sexuality.

=== 1990s ===
Research on population control, sexually transmitted diseases, premarital sex, sexual harassment, and AIDS began to be conducted during the 1990s.

=== 2010s ===
As of 2017 more than 30 million Filipinos can reach the Internet through a smartphone, tablet, laptop or desktop computer. Thereby they have access to practically unlimited information about sexuality, including birth control, sexually transmitted diseases and sexually explicit video.

In 2018, the Department of Education issued Memorandum No. 31 which integrates "age and development-appropriate" comprehensive sex education in public and private schools in the Philippines

== Filipino youth and sexuality ==
Contemporary studies and surveys show the effects of ongoing sex education in the Philippines:

=== 1994 ===
A 1994 survey was carried out by Dr. Z.C. Zablan, a demography professor from the Population Institute of the University of the Philippines, in relation to the views on sexuality by 11,000 Filipino youth whose ages ranged from 15 to 24 years old. The result of this study that he entitled Young Adult Fertility and Sexuality Survey showed that 80% of Philippine youth do not endorse premarital sexual encounters, 18% of young Filipinos accepted the occurrence of premarital sexual activity, while 2% gave a neutral position about the subject matter.

Zablan also found out that 35% of women who graduated from colleges implement female liberalism and flexible attitudes toward sex, compared to 40% who preferred the use of contraceptives, and that 65% of less-educated and dependent females residing in rural areas have more conservative sexual values and behavior, but are more prone to not using contraceptives. In connection with this, Zabala's study also revealed that there is a trend for refined and professional males to become relaxed and comfortable with copulation, with seduction and sexual stimulation, and with alternating active and passive social roles.

=== 2009 ===
In 2009, a survey was done by Irala et al among 3,726 Filipino student teenagers regarding their opinions on relationships, love, sexuality, and related items. This study that targeted third year high school to third year college participants aged 13 to 18 years old revealed that they primarily received information and opinion on love and sexuality from friends and parents. Most female teenagers also oppose sexism.

== Sex industry ==
As of 2009, one source estimated that there were 800,000 women working as prostitutes in the Philippines.

Prostitution caters to local customers and foreigners. Media attention tends to focus on those areas catering to sex tourism, primarily through bars staffed by bargirls. Cities where there is a high incidence of prostitution are Angeles City, Olongapo, Subic Bay, and Pasay, with the customers usually foreign businessmen from East Asian and Western nations.

== Pornography ==
Based on the Revised Penal Code of the Philippines and Republic Act No. 7610, pornography is defined as doctrines, publications, and shows that are immoral, obscene, and indecent. Philippine legislations penalize involvement in these activities, including the abuse, exploitation, prostitution, and discrimination of children.

== Single mother phenomenon and high religiosity dictohomy ==
See single mother phenomenon of Philippines.

== See also ==
- Responsible Parenthood and Reproductive Health Act of 2012
- Adolescent Pregnancy Prevention Bill
- Bakla
- Courtship in the Philippines
- LGBT rights in the Philippines
- Obando Fertility Rites
