= Abanico =

Abanico may refer to:

- Abanico, the Spanish word for hand fan
- Abanico (music), a drum roll and rimshot played on timbales to introduce a new section
- Abanico ibérico, a Spanish cut of pork
- A striking move in escrima fighting

== See also ==
- Abaniko, a Filipino hand fan
