= Pornography and erotica in the Philippines =

In the Philippines, pornography is not specifically defined in Philippine law, but the Revised Penal Code of the Philippines considers certain acts to be obscene or indecent and these are prohibited as immoral doctrines, obscene publications, indecent shows, or other similar material or portrayals that advocate human immorality, obscenity, and indecency. Philippine legislation penalizes participation in these unlawful activities, and Republic Act No. 7610 extends punishment to those involved in child abuse, child exploitation, child prostitution and discrimination of children.

== Historical background ==
Pornographic materials first arrived in the Philippines in 1946, in the form of pornographic magazines imported from the United States. During the 1960s, magazines for women in the Philippines featured literary articles featuring topics on contraception, sexual health, marriage, erotica and sexual liberation with the purpose of improving marital relationship, and not as an impediment or replacement to romantic or appropriate natural and normal human sexuality.

Also in this decade, pornography became accessible to interested affluent adult men and women who are in a mature relationship that can be viewed through eight-millimeter portable film projectors, before the introduction of the more affordable videocassettes. Although illegal, local video rental shops and newsstands became the primary channel of for-sale and rented pornographic materials. Locally produced pornographic and erotic media in the Philippines became available in the forms of published materials and pre-recorded and live sex shows. The first soft-core pornographic Philippine-made movie appeared in the 1970s, entitled Uhaw (literally, "thirst", but figuratively denotes "sexual hunger" or "sexual desire"), a film wherein the lead female role was portrayed by a former Philippine beauty pageant queen, Merle Fernandez, older sister of the action star Rudy Fernandez. Production of homemade and poor-quality hardcore sexually oriented films also appeared later on, prior to the arrival of CDs, VCDs, DVDs, cable television, mail-order services and Internet-accessible visuals and information on sexual activity.

== Philippine pornography industry and market ==
According to a news report by the American Chronicle on May 30, 2009, the underground Philippine pornography industry earned about $1 billion in American dollars in 2006, ranking the illegal Philippine pornography black market in eighth place around the world, tied together with Canada and Taiwan. Pornographic film producers have offices in Angeles City, Olongapo, Manila, Pasay, Makati, and Quezon City, where male and female prostitutes are hired to play sexual roles for adult films. The hardcore pornography industry is non-existent in the Philippines, but such productions are subcontracted by foreign producers – including businessmen from the United States – to local filmmakers.

=== Erotic publications ===
In general, there are three major categories of erotic publications in the Philippines.

Long after the publication of the Tik-Tik, Sakdal, and Playboy Scenes magazines in the Philippines, a Filipino edition of Playboy, named Playboy Philippines, was initiated in the country on March 15, 2008. Its first issue was released in April 2008. There was a difference in the presentation for its Filipino audience and readership in order not to go against Filipino business, cultural, and social values. Among these characteristic differences from its Western or typically racy counterparts are the non-display of frontal nudity and human genitalia, although it features Filipino women as "playmates".

== Survey ==
An informal consumption survey was conducted by a Filipino medical practitioner, revealed that modern-day Filipino men and women have different purposes for viewing or reading erotic and sexually related materials. Based on the study, female consumers evolves around the "couple context" or relationship context, while male patrons do so in relation to solitary sexual activity. Leyson's study also found out that there is a continuous rise in preferences among “educated, sophisticated, and professional” men and women who are engaged in an intimate relationship for so-called "clean" or "softcore" versions of sexually oriented resources.

== See also ==
- Bomba (genre)
- Child pornography laws in the Philippines
- Anti-Trafficking in Persons Act of 2003
