= Sukob =

- Theatrical release poster
- Directed by: Chito S. Roño
- Screenplay by: Chito S. Roño; Chris Martinez
- Story by: Chito S. Roño
- Produced by: Charo Santos-Concio; Malou N. Santos
- Starring: Kris Aquino; Claudine Barretto
- Cinematography: Eli Balce
- Edited by: Manet Dayrit
- Production company: Star Cinema
- Distributed by: Star Cinema
- Release dates: July 26, 2006 (Philippines); August 13, 2006 (United States); September 28, 2006 (Singapore); January 4, 2007 (Malaysia)
- Running time: 100 minutes
- Country: Philippines
- Language: Filipino
- Box office: ₱186.41 million (Domestic); ₱203 million (Worldwide); US$300,454.00 (United States)

Sukob (transl. Huddle), also known as The Wedding Curse, is a 2006 Filipino supernatural horror film directed by Chito S. Roño and starring Kris Aquino and Claudine Barretto. Sukob was considered as the highest-grossing Filipino film of all-time earning ₱203 million, until 2009 when it was surpassed by the romance film You Changed My Life. The film's premise is based on a Filipino superstition sukob in which one should not get married within the same year an immediate relative dies or marries.

== Plot ==
Overseas Filipino worker Sandy returns to the Philippines with her fiancé, Dale, from Dubai, for their wedding. Upon returning to her home, Sandy learns from a caretaker of her neighbor's house that Helen, Sandy's childhood friend, had died along with her family years ago. According to Sandy's mother Tessie, Helen announced her engagement after the death of her father, disregarding the old superstition that a marriage held within the same year of an immediate family member's death will be cursed. A few weeks after the wedding, the husband perished in a plane crash, Helen died in a bus accident at the crash site, and her mother disappeared inside their home afterwards.

In Bibiclat, Aliaga, Diana and Brian's marriage celebration is interrupted by the sound of a funeral toll from the belfry of the church. Resuming the wedding reception, Diana glimpses a mysterious flower girl watching her. The next day, while renovating their house, Brian falls off the roof and dies at the hospital. While mourning Brian's death, Diana is attacked by the flower girl at the morgue. Brian's mother Belen, Erning, Grace and her mother Lagring arrive to find that Brian's body has disappeared; in its place they find Diana's wedding veil.

Sandy and Dale proceeded with their wedding. During the ceremony, Sandy also sees the flower girl. After their reception, Sandy and Dale witness the van of Sandy's friends Betsy and Edith fall down a ravine. Rescuers are unable to find their bodies, instead finding Sandy's wedding veil. Joya, the psychic daughter of Dale's cousin Paola, reveals the same connection that happened at Helen's wedding.

Lagring and Grace chase after a dazed Diana who is lured into the forest by her husband's ghost. When Grace finally catches up to her, they see the flower girl once again as Lagring is rammed by a speeding bus, leaving Diana's bridal cord at the scene.

Sandy and Dale decide to seek help from Joya and they learn from Gilda, Dale's mother, that Paola is headed to Nueva Ecija. The couple arrive at the bus station before Paola could leave with her daughter. After convincing the latter's help, they arrive at Helen's former home along with Tessie to contact her spirit. While the group distracts the caretaker, Joya encounters a stray malevolent spirit who possesses her and warns Sandy that her wedding is cursed.

Shocked as none of her relatives nor Dale's had died recently, Paola reveals that siblings who propose their vows on the same year will also be cursed by sukob. Joya then reveals the identity of the spirit who possessed her, leading to Tessie discovering that her husband Fred had an affair, resulting in a child whom he abandoned. When confronted, Fred reveal that he had left his now-deceased lover Claudia a year ago, before the child reached adulthood.

When Sandy and Diana receive their respective wedding photos, the people who had died are all headless and the others who remain are bound to die including themselves. Diana, who turns out to be Claudia's daughter, is accompanied by Erning and Grace in seeking help from a hermit to reveal the nature of the curse. He then warns Diana, who is now pregnant after the wedding, that the spirit will claim her child when her face is partially faded in her photo.

Fed up with her husband's infidelity, Tessie storms out of the house and drives off, but a car driven by a drunk driver knocks down a construction site, killing Tessie and leaving behind Sandy's cord in place of her body. The next day after driving Paola and Joya back to their house, Sandy and Dale arrived at Bibiclat to find the former's half-sister. But as they rest at a hotel, Sandy leaves the key to their room and leaves Dale trapped inside where he is claimed by the spirit with the Unity candle. The spirit then pursues Diana and Grace who attempt to leave town and claims Grace who is taken away by her mother's apparition at the roadside.

Sandy and Diana, who are now the last remaining victims, meet each other after the curse follows them to the police station where they drop by and are lured by the spirit before they later recognize themselves as sisters during their conversation en route. Acquiring the paraphernalia from Diana's wedding that the curse blighted on, she and Sandy arrive at the hermit's hut to burn them at a ritual but the spirit attacks the hermit after which the sisters escape with the arrhae. Retreating back to town during the Taong Putik Festival, Sandy and Diana go to the church where the latter was wed. Cornered at the top of the belfry, Sandy attempts to crush the arrhae but the spirit arrives and has hers from her wedding. As the curse attempts to take Diana's child, Sandy stops the spirit and falls from the belfry to her death, sacrificing herself to spare her half-sister and end the curse.

Diana reunites with their father who arrives to reconcile with her after mourning Sandy's death, guilty for his actions that have constrained his family and Claudia. Arriving back home with his daughter to accompany him, the curse now lingers on Fred as he is haunted by Tessie and Sandy's ghosts who arrive at his house to claim him.

== Cast ==
=== Main cast ===
- Kris Aquino as Sandy
- Claudine Barretto as Diana

=== Supporting cast ===
- Wendell Ramos as Dale
- Ronaldo Valdez as Fred
- Boots Anson-Roa as Tessie
- Bernard Palanca as Brian
- Liza Lorena as Gilda
- Maja Salvador as Joya
- Raquel Villavicencio as Belen
- Jhong Hilario as Erning
- Glaiza de Castro as Grace
- Maurene Mauricio as Paola
- Ku Aquino as Mang Cesar

=== Guest cast ===
- Mon Confiado as Driver
- Renee Summer as Edith
- Louie Anderson as Betsy
- Loida Manuel as Ghostly Flower Girl
- Soliman Cruz as Man on Carabao
- Cris Daluz as Dante

== International release ==
Sukob (The Wedding Curse) was released in the United States in eight theaters. It earned $300,454.

== Reception ==
The film was a critical and commercial success. The film grossed more than ₱100 million in its first week. It earned ₱186.41 million domestically and ₱203 million worldwide.

It was lampooned in the parody film Pasukob, where the storyline is twisted in comedic flair, and in the movie Sisterakas, which contains a scene where Kris Aquino's character is pranked by a ghostly figure warning that her marriage is cursed, to which she replies that her marriage is already annulled, a reference to Aquino's real-life marital history.

== Awards and recognitions ==
- 1st Gawad Genio Awards (The Annual Critics' Academy Film Desk)
  Best Film sound engineer: Albert Michael Idioma
  Blockbuster Film: Sukob
  Blockbuster Film Director: Chito S. Rono
  Blockbuster Film Actress: Claudine barretto and Kris Aquino
  Blockbuster Film Actor: Wendell Ramos
  Blockbuster Film Producer: Star Cinema - ABS-CBN Film Productions, Inc.

== See also ==
- Star Cinema
- ABS-CBN Corporation
- List of ghost films
