= Tampuhan (painting) =

1895 painting by Juan Luna

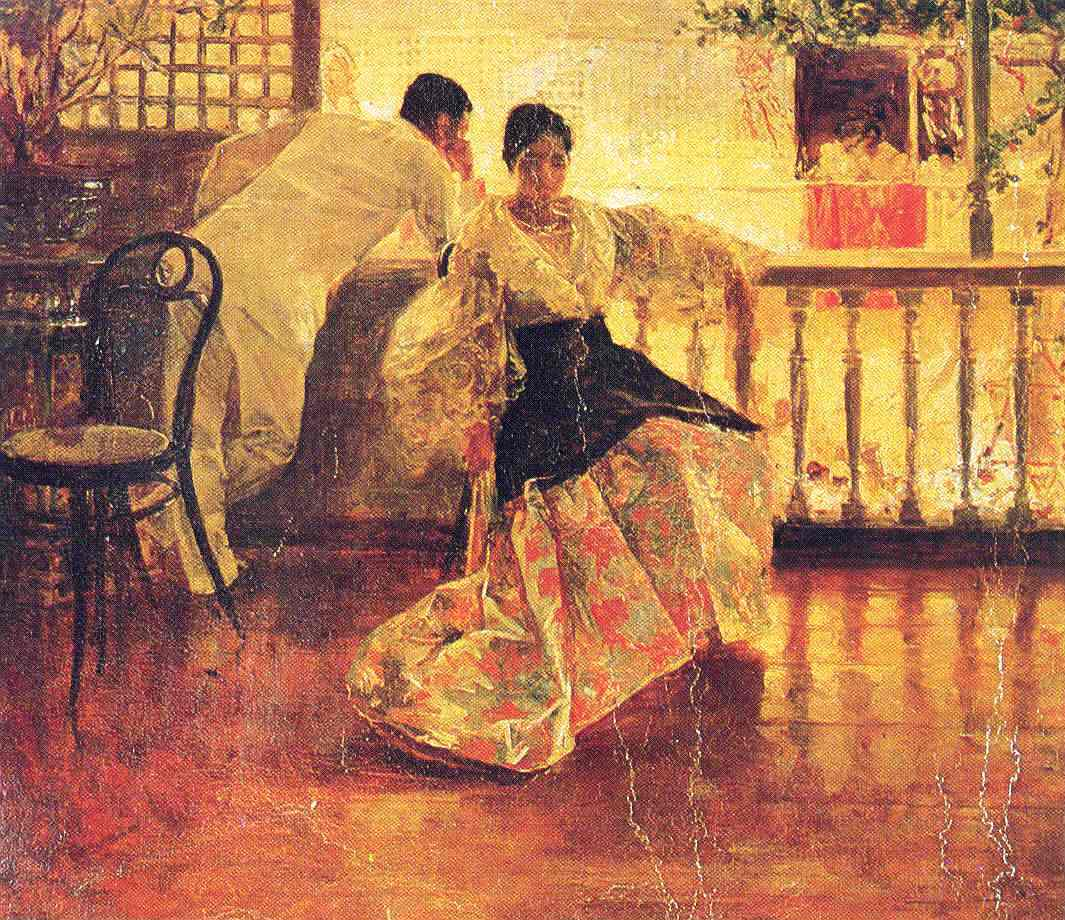
- Artist: Juan Luna
- Year: 1895
- Location: Private collection

Tampuhan, meaning "sulking", is an 1895 classic oil on canvas impressionist painting by Filipino painter and revolutionary activist Juan Luna. It depicts a Filipino man and a Filipino woman having a lovers' quarrel.

== Description ==
Luna's Tampuhan is a depiction of two persons staying inside the sala or living room of a Bahay na Bato. The two people are Filipino lovers sulking – experiencing "tampo" – because of an argument. The man is looking out at the street beside a Capiz-shell window, leaning on the ventanilla. The woman, on the other hand, wearing a Maria Clara gown, has her eyes focused on the floor. According to Rosalinda Orosa, the man is Ariston Bautista Lin, a friend of Luna who studied medicine in Europe. Orosa further described that the woman is Emiliana Trinidad. Trinidad is the ancestor of the owner of the painting, and is claimed by Orosa to be the same woman who posed for Luna's La Bulaqueña, another of his artworks that illustrate Filipino culture.

== Relation to Filipino culture ==
In Filipino courtship, culture, values and psychology, tampuhan (from the Filipino-language root word tampo) or sulking is in essence a disagreement between a couple where they do not speak to each other. This is sometimes called "the silent treatment". Other expressions of sulking in the love life of Filipinos include other non-verbal actions such as keeping to one's self, being unusually quiet, or refusing to interact with friends in group activities, family outings or other activities, and even merely locking one's self in his or her bedroom. To end the sulking, one of the lovers has to coax the other, or both persuade each other to resolve by coming up with an agreement or compromise. The setting is also significant to Philippine culture as the couples are depicted to live in a traditional colonial Filipino house known as bahay na bato, with its iconic interior and structure fit for the tropical climate, while the woman is wearing the traditional Maria Clara gown of Filipino women.
