= Filipiniana dress =

Filipiniana dress, Filipiniana attire, or simply Filipiniana, refers to the traditional Filipino attires for men and women, particularly formal wear. It can refer to:

- Baro't saya, the traditional Filipino attire for women

- Maria Clara gown, also known as the traje de mestiza, the aristocratic version of the baro't saya
- Terno, an early 20th-century unified version of the Maria Clara gown characterized by butterfly sleeves

- Barong tagalog, the traditional formal Filipino attire for men
