= Traditional marriage =

Traditional marriage may refer to:

- Marriage and its customs and practices in a particular culture
- Islamic views on marriage
- Jewish views on marriage
- Christian views on marriage
- Opposite-sex marriage, used primarily by opponents of same-sex marriage.
- Traditional marriage customs in the Philippines
