= Apir =

Filipino hand-held fans

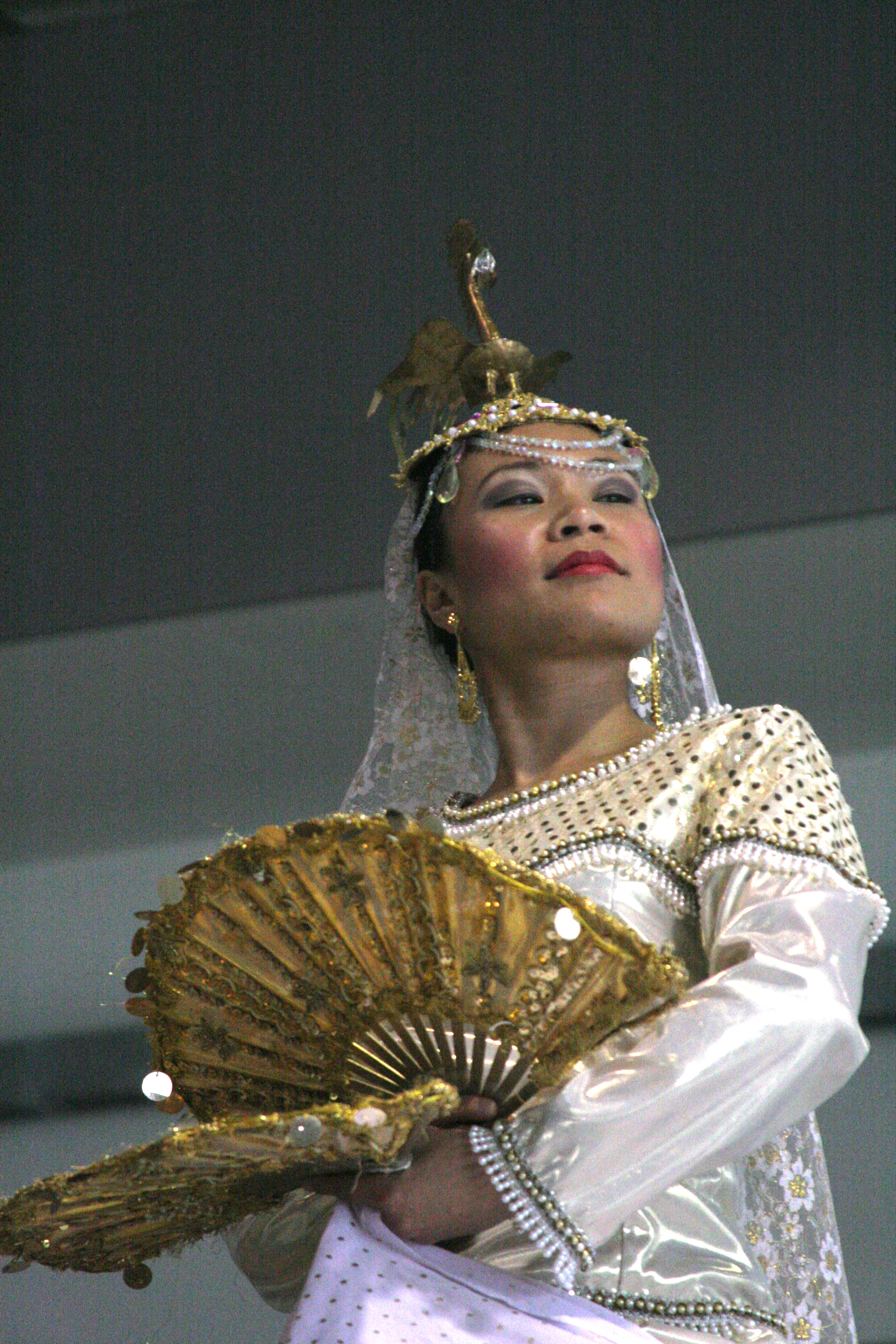
A dancer in traditional Maranao costume with a pair of apir

Apir, also spelled aper, are traditional folding women's hand-held fans of the Maranao people of the Philippines. They are a part of the traditional dress of Maranao women. Royal bai (ladies) carry an apir in their right hand during ceremonies. A pair of apir fans are also commonly featured in Maranao traditional dances, including singkil and pagapir.

== See also ==
- Abaniko
- Pamaypay
- Darangen
