= Pamaypay =

Traditional Philippine hand fan

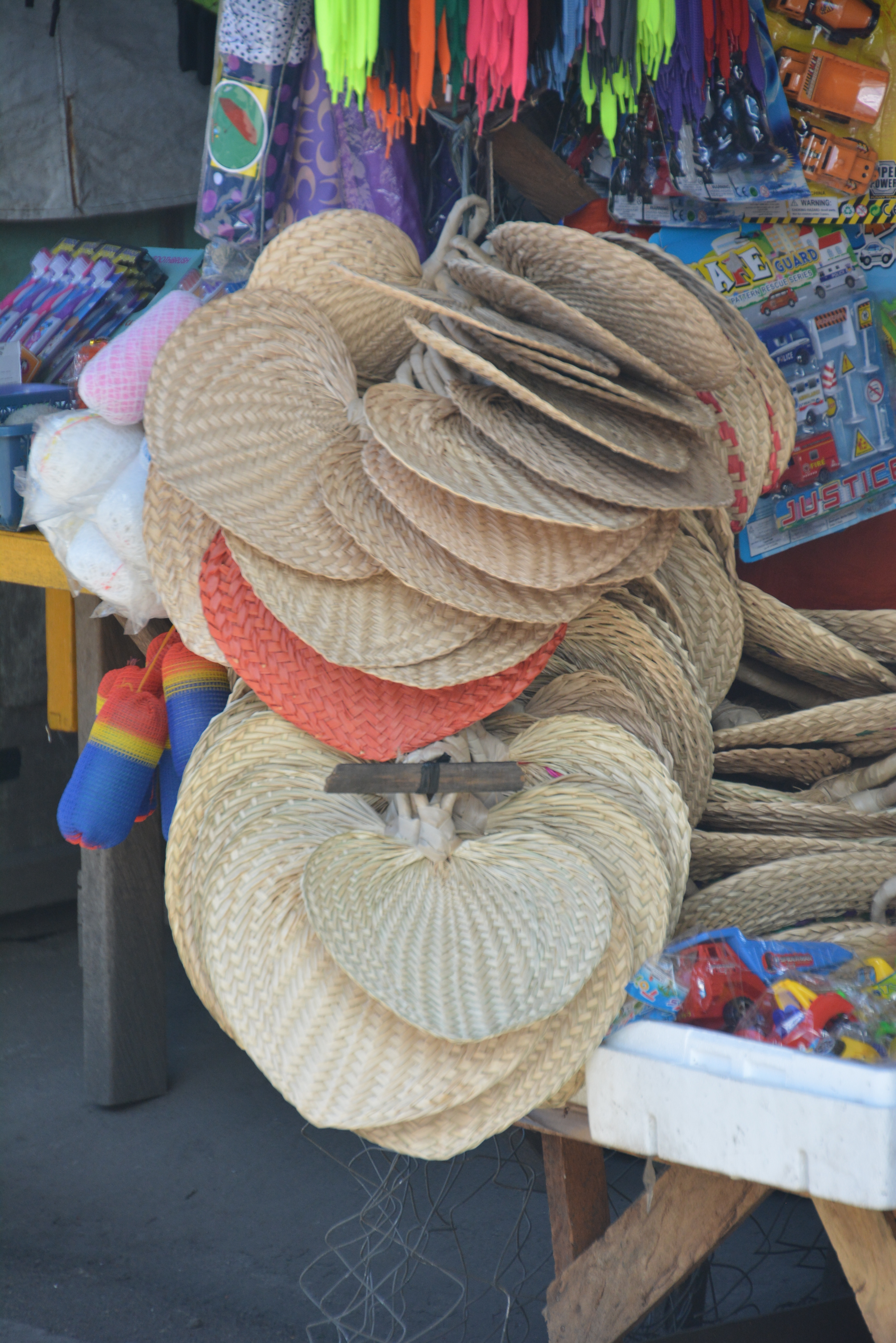
Pamaypay for sale in Iriga City, Philippines

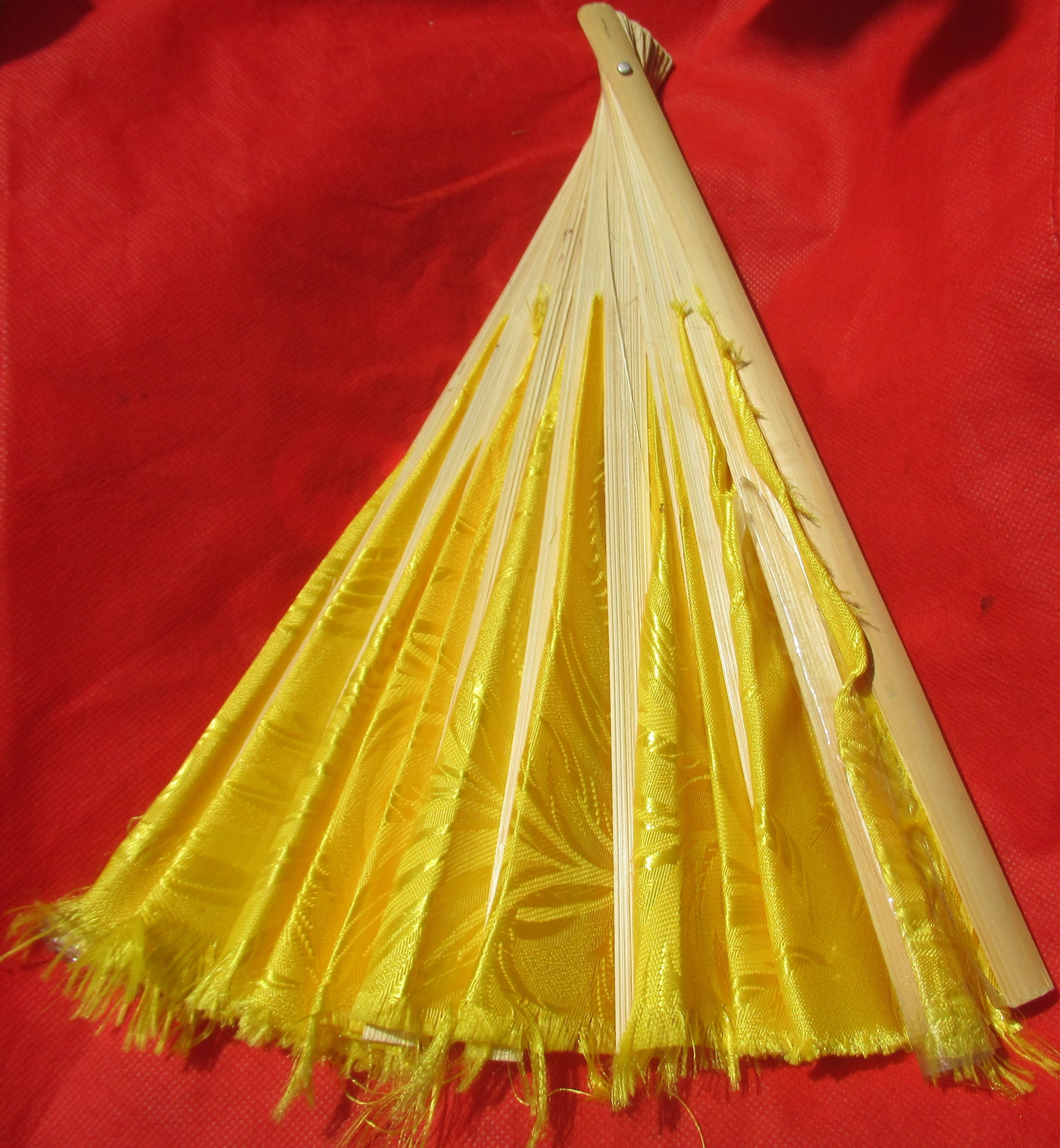
A worn, mass-produced abaniko of bamboo and patterned fabric

Pamaypay (Tagalog pronunciation: [pɐmaɪˈpaɪ], puh-my-PY), also known as paypay, payupas, buri fan, or anahaw fan, is a type of traditional hand-held fan from the Philippines. It is typically made of woven buri palm or anahaw palm leaves. It is usually heart-shaped, and woven in a technique known as sawali (twilled). The edges are braided and merges into a looped handle. It is also typically made into wall decorations and other handicrafts.

The term is also sometimes used for the abaniko, a folding hand fan used by the upper classes in the Spanish colonial period of the Philippines.

== See also ==
- Abaniko
- Apir
- Hand fan
- Buntal hat
- Baro't saya
