= Adolescent Pregnancy Prevention Bill =

Proposed legislation in the Philippines

Congress of the Philippines
- Long title: An Act Providing for a National Policy in Preventing Adolescent Pregnancies and Institutionalizing Social Protection for Adolescent Parents
- Enacted by: House of Representatives of the Philippines
- Enacted by: Senate of the Philippines

Legislative history

Initiating chamber: House of Representatives of the Philippines
- Bill title: An Act Providing for a National Policy in Preventing Adolescent Pregnancies and Institutionalizing Social Protection for Adolescent Parents
- Bill citation: House Bill 8910
- Introduced: August 16, 2023
- First reading: August 16, 2023
- Second reading: August 30, 2023
- Third reading: September 5, 2023

Revising chamber: Senate of the Philippines
- Bill title: An Act Providing for a National Policy in Preventing Adolescent Pregnancies, Institutionalizing Social Protection for Adolescent Parents, and Providing Funds Therefor
- Bill citation: Senate Bill 1979
- First reading: March 7, 2023

Keywords
- teenage pregnancy, adolescent pregnancies
- Status: Pending — before Senate of the Philippines

Adolescent Pregnancy Prevention Bill is a proposed legislation in the Congress of the Philippines pertaining to sex education as a response to the growing issue of teenage pregnancy in the Philippines. It is known as House Bill No. 8910 in the House of Representatives and Senate Bill 1979 in the Senate.

== Legislative history ==
=== House of Representatives ===
The bill passed the second reading on August 30, 2023. It was approved in the third and final reading on September 5, 2023 All 232 Congressmen present voted for the approval of bill. A counterpart bill in the Senate is still pending. A counterpart bill in the Senate is still pending.

=== Senate ===
Senate Bill No. 1979 was filed on March 7, 2023; earlier than its House counterpart. It is sponsored by Senator Risa Hontiveros. Imee Marcos, Bong Revilla, and Sonny Angara are the three other original co-authors. It is a substitution of:

- Senate Bill No. 372: Prevention of Adolescent Pregnancy Act of 2022 of Risa Hontiveros
- Senate Bill No. 651: Teenage Pregnancy Prevention Act of Imee Marcos
- Senate Bill No. 1209: Prevention of Adolescent Pregnancy Act of 2022 of Bong Revilla

Senate Bill No. 1979 also references Senate Resolution No. 462 introduced by Sonny Angara in February 2023 which urged the government to deal with the rising cases of teenage pregnancy among girls ages 10 to 14 citing data from the Philippine Statistics Authority

Cynthia Villar expressed her intention to co-author in September 2024 but withdrew in January 2025. Raffy Tulfo expressed intention to co-author in December 2024.

The proposed legislation has yet to reach the second reading.

Following opposition by Project Dalisay in January 2025 and the withdrawal of signatures by seven senators from the associated committee report, Risa Hontiveros, on January 22, 2025, filed a substitution bill to amend the contentious provisions of SB 1979.

== Content ==
Both the House and Senate versions of the Adolescent Pregnancy Prevention Bill tackle sex education for adolescents. The Angelica Natasha Co of the Barangay Health Wellness Partylist notes that the two differs in content and construction.

The house version calls for the development of community-based and culturally-sensitive, age-and developmentally-appropriate comprehensive adolescent sexuality education (CASE).

The senate version proposes comprehensive sex education guided by Department of Education and "international standards".

== Reception ==
=== Project Dalisay ===
The proposed Adolescent Pregnancy Prevention Bill did not receive any significant reception until January 2025, when the Project Dalisay was launched by the National Coalition for the Family and the Constitution (NCFC).

The NCFC published a viral video featuring Maria Lourdes Sereno, Philippine Council of Evangelical Churches Legal Advisory and Public Policy Review Commission chairperson and former chief justice. In the video it claims an "international program" by the UNESCO, United Nations Population Fund), and the UNICEF is in place to hypersexualize children at a very early age will encourage childhood masturbation as young as four years old. The group says that the "international standards" for the comprehensive sex education (CSE) in the proposed bill will be patterned after UNESCO and World Health Organization standards.

Project Dalisay refuses to categorize its action as spreading fake news or fearmongering and that its campaign is an attack against a specific politician.

=== President ===
President Bongbong Marcos initially supported the bill recognizing the problems of teenage pregnancy. However, on January 20, 2025, Marcos retracted his support and says that the bill is promoting a "woke mentality", believing it "teach four-year-olds how to masturbate" and every child to "try different sexualities". He threatened to veto the bill.

=== Congress ===
==== Senate ====
On January 16, 2025, Senator Joel Villanueva who is also associated with the Jesus Is Lord Church Worldwide joined the NCFC in opposing the bill. He believes that the bill will remove parental consent in sex education in the school system. Senate president Chiz Escudero said he has opposed the bill even before the NCFC expressed its position. Senator Sherwin Gatchalian said he will organize an inquiry in aid of legislation to discuss the NCFC's claims on the bill and the Department of Education sex-ed curriculum is based on "Western" and "liberal" standards of sexuality under the World Health Organization and UNESCO guidelines.

Seven senators wrote letters to Senate president Escudero to withdraw their signature from the Committee Report No. 41. Nancy Binay, JV Ejercito, Cynthia Villar, and Bong Go on January 21 withdrew their signatures. Jinggoy Estrada, Bong Revilla and Loren Legarda also wrote separate letters. Go himself emphasized his signature is merely procedural and does not imply endorsement.

While co-author Imee Marcos when queried said that withdrawal of her signature from the report is premature, she also said that the SB 1979 is "significantly different" from her original measure. Revilla also said that his original measure was different from SB 1979.

Senator Risa Hontiveros condemned Project Dalisay's claims as "outright lies". She says that the CSE only covers adolescents ages 10 years and above. She clarified that "international standards" are only part of the guidelines and CSE is still primarily guided by the Constitution and Filipino culture and values.

==== House of Representatives ====
Rufus Rodriguez of Cagayan de Oro's 2nd district on January 17, 2025, filed a resolution urging the withdrawal of House Bill No. 891. He thinks that the bill which he deride as "deceptive" violated the constitution's single-subject provision by institutionalizing comprehensive sex education when the bill's title suggest it tackles teenage pregnancy prevention. He also noted the NCFC's stance.

Rodriguez commends president Marcos statements which speaks to the chief executive's "moral values" pronouncing the bill as "dead on arrival".

=== United Nations organizations ===
UN Population Fund to the Philippines deputy representative Roi Avena said that the masturbation by very young children and exploration of sexualities are not found in the proposed bill and not part of the international guidelines and ultimately it is up to individual countries to implement their own comprehensive sex education based on their local contexts.

=== Other ===
The Child Rights Network urged Marcos not to veto the bill and that he should elaborate on his reasons to object to the bill.

Enough is Enough, an advocacy group for school youth sexual abuse victims condemned the public outcry and the disinformation campaign against the bill and insists that the lack of sex education keeps the youth vulnerable against sexual predators.

== See also ==
- Responsible Parenthood and Reproductive Health Act of 2012
- Comprehensive sex education, primarily in the United States context
