= Sumpong =

Filipino psychology

Sumpong, in Filipino psychology, refers to a range of short-term or temporary temperaments, mood problems, or illnesses wherein a person withdraws affection or cheerfulness from people in general.

The behavior has roots in the Filipino culture, so the term has no English equivalent, but "having a bad day," "temperament problem," "mood," "tantrum," "neurosis" and even "chronic illness" may be considered close translations, depending on the context.

== Manifestations of Sumpong ==
Sumpong is usually manifested by those who were not able to sleep well. There is the absence of a cheerful behavior, and its expression is almost entirely nonverbal. These manifestations include:

- refusing to eat, work, or play
- being unusually quiet
- simply keeping to one's self
- withdrawing from the group
- resisting expressions of affection
- locking one's self in his or her room
- not joining friends in group activities
- not talking to the person concerned, or to people in general

These are usually efforts to get the offending party to go away, and if these behaviors do not work, the person with sumpong might choose to escalate them - foot stomping, door slamming, and shouting, for example.

== Cultural reason for Sumpong ==
While these external manifestations may indeed sound like a temperament or mood problem in the western sense, the underlying cultural reason for them is what sets sumpong apart. While tantrums and moodiness have strong negative connotations in western countries, sumpong is understandable among Filipinos. In fact, sumpong has positive connotations for the Filipino aside from the obvious negatives ones. Having sumpong is a manifestation of being able to feel and not being too passive.

Like tampo, the cultural behavior sumpong roots from the nonconfrontational nature of Filipino culture. That is to say, it is a way of expressing hurt feelings in a culture where the direct expression of anger or resentment is discouraged. The withdrawal behaviors in sumpong are indirect ways of expressing hostility or resentment.

It can also be seen as a way by which Filipinos "save face," as direct confrontation is usually a threat to "smooth interpersonal relationships" (SIR), which is a deeply valued in Philippine society.

== Dealing with sumpong ==
The basic expectation of one who meets a person with sumpong is to go away or to refrain from jesting with the person. One way of dealing with a person with sumpong is to respond to the person with the mood problem with friendly overtures or expressions of concern. Not to do this may, however, cause spontaneous healing ("nawala na ang sumpong") after a short "cooling off" period. In most cases of sumpong, healing the inner, emotional relationship between two people is usually more critical than resolving the issue itself.

== Related cultural traits ==
Like other Asians, Filipinos believe strongly in tampo and in saving face. This is why, in response to an invitation, when a Filipino says yes, it might mean “yes”, but could mean “maybe”, or even “I don't know.” It is often difficult for Filipinos to bring themselves to say no, and it is a good idea to confirm a dinner invitation several times to ensure that they did not say yes because they could not find a proper way to say no. Also tied to saving face are amor propio, which means self-respect; and hiya, which means shame. A Filipino would be thought of as lacking amor propio if, for example, they accepted criticism weakly or did not offer honored guests the proper hospitality. Hiya is felt by those whose actions are seen as socially unacceptable, and one of the ultimate insults in Philippine society is to be labeled walang-hiya, which roughly translates to being shameless. Everyone is expected to have hiya, and to win the respect of others by conforming to community norms.

== Term usage ==
- May sumpong - the person has, currently, a temperament problem that may last for a while
- Sinusumpong - present participle form, or the person is currently not in good mood and doing tantrums
- Sinusumpong ng (asthma, or any other illness) - the person is not in good mood because of a recurring illness, say, asthma or any other illness.
- Susumpungin - future tense of the word, usually an affectionate threat.
- Sumpungan - meet the person head-on
- Sumpungin - (accent on the second syllable) a humorous adjective that refers to frequent moodiness or temperament problems.
- Pasumpong-sumpong - a disease or an illness, such as allergy, that happens once in a while and quite unpredictable

== See also ==
- Depression (mood)
