= Abaniko =

Folding fan of the Philippines

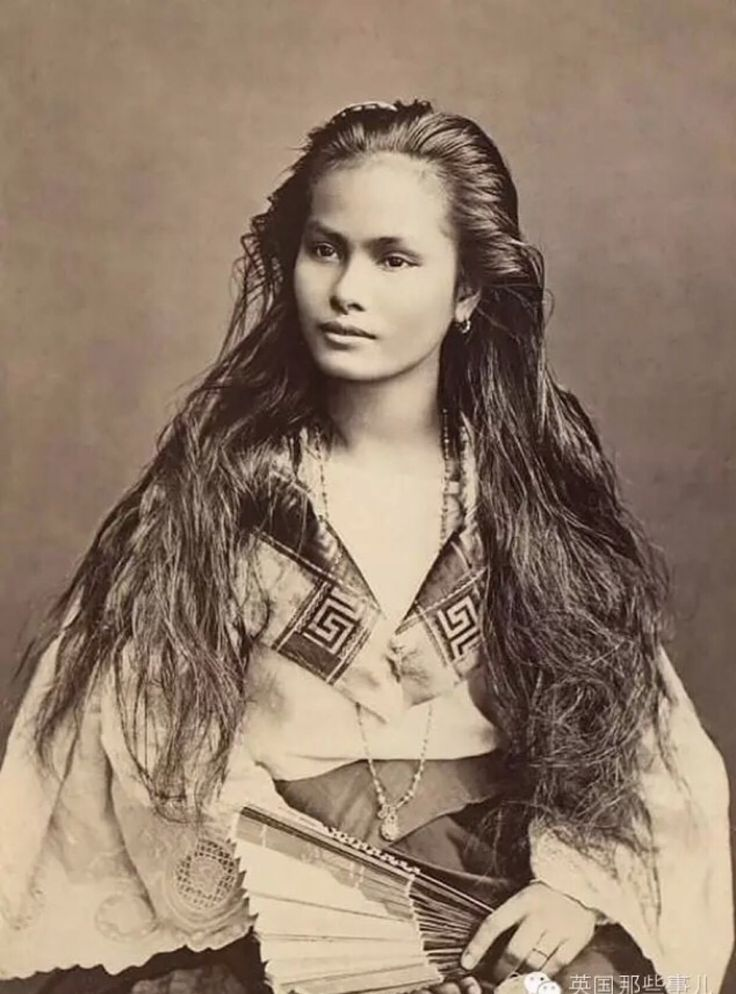
A Mestiza Sangley-Filipina holding a folded abaniko

An abaniko (from the Spanish word abanico, "fan") is a type of hand fan from the Philippines.

== Description ==
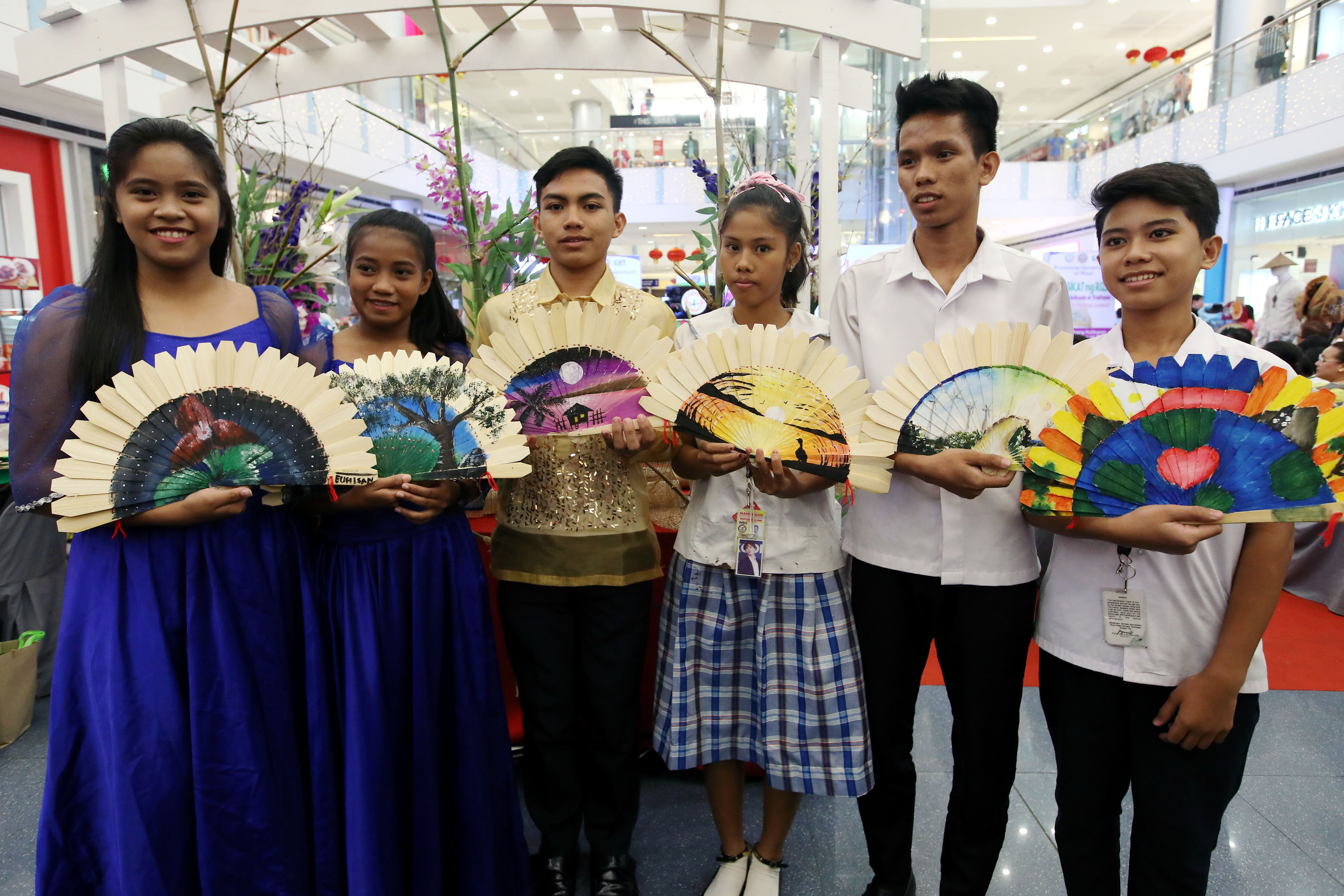
Students show art abanikos from Rizal province in February 2018.

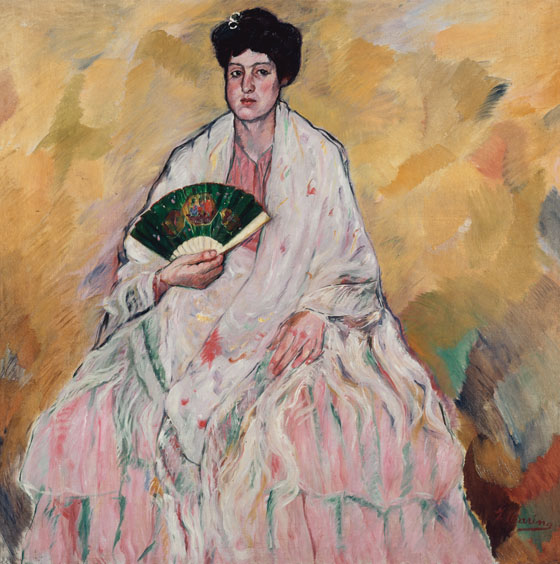
Francisco Iturrino, Mujer con mantón de Manila y abanico, c. 1910.

The abaniko is common accessory for the baro't saya, the traditional ladies’ attire. Various ways of using and holding the abaniko may convey different meanings. For example, an open abaniko that covers the chest area is a sign of modesty, while rapid fan movements express the lady's displeasure.

Abaniko is sometimes referred to as pamaypáy, though the term actually refers to the non-folding, native hand fan of woven buri or anahaw leaves.

== In sport ==
Abaniko is the term for a striking blow in the martial art of Eskrima that resembles a fanning motion. It is executed with a single bastón (hardwood or rattan stick).

== See also ==
- Apir
- Pamaypay
