= Pamamanhikan =

Filipino courting rite

The pamamanhikan (Tagalog: [pɐ.mɐ.mɐn̪ˈhi.xɐn̪]) (English: supplication, request, literally "climbing up, ascension process") in the Philippines is performed when a woman and man after a long relationship decides to get married. It is where the man formally asks the woman's hand from her parents while he is with his own parents. In some places, the man even includes the Punong Barangay (Barangay Captain) or other influential relatives or friends to participate in the pamamanhikan. There is usually a banquet when pamamanhikan takes place. This is the time, when the date and location of the couple's wedding are discussed, even some other details, such as the godfather and godmother, the wedding priest, bridesmaids and groomsmen, dining area, and even the list of guests.

To woo a Filipina into marriage, her parents must give consent for the male Filipino to be given the opportunity to serve the girl's family. He may help in the farm or in the house chores. In due time, the family of the girl and boy schedule pamamanhikan. The boy's family visits the girl's family to ask for the girl's hand in marriage. It is also a time to talk about arrangements for the wedding ceremony.
