= Las arras =

Wedding object

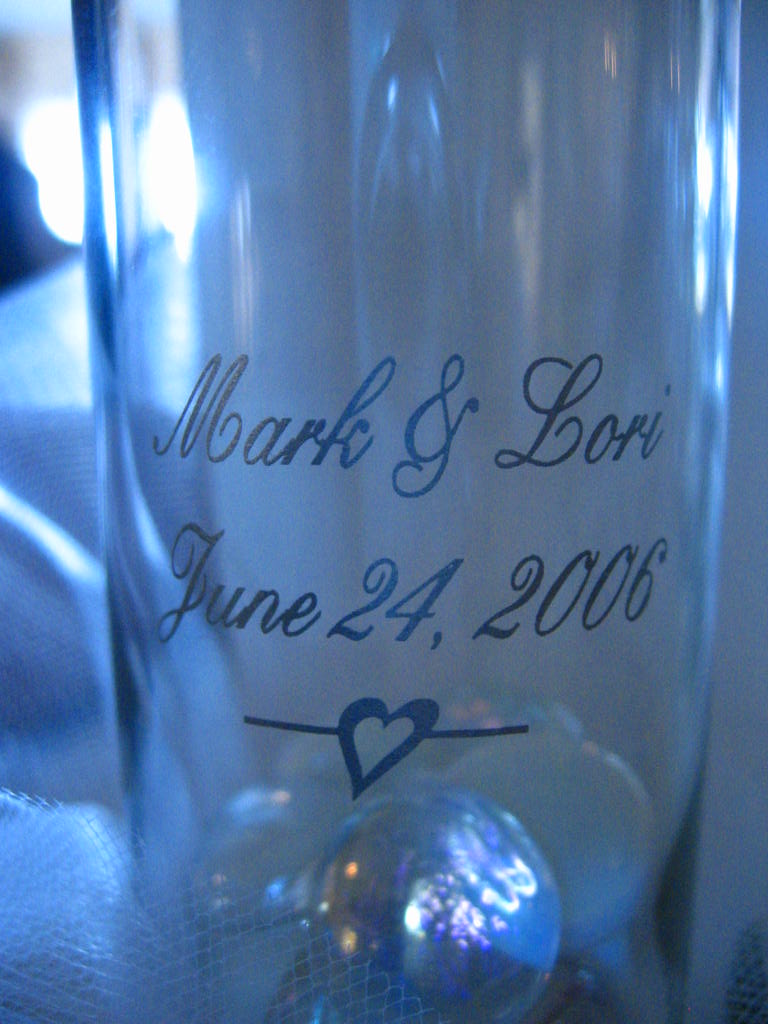
Wedding token

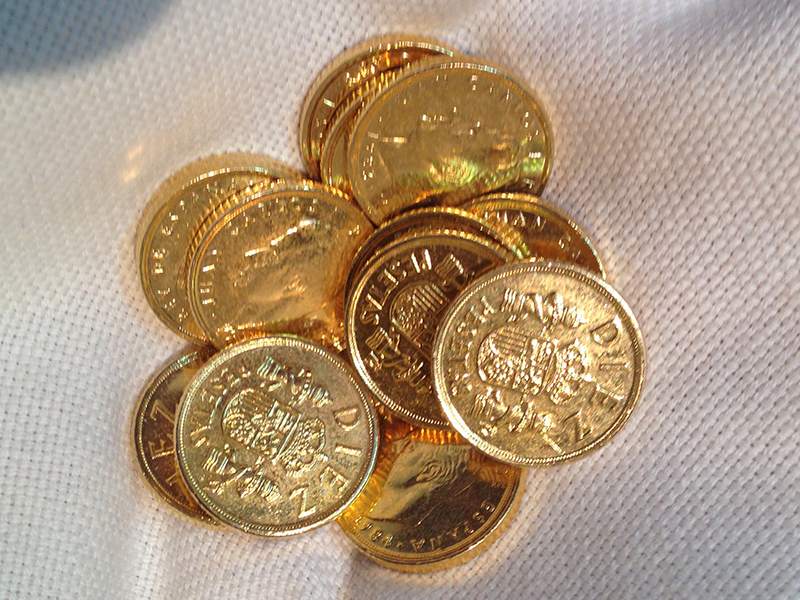
13 arras matrimoniales: gold coins

Las arras, or las arras matrimoniales (English: arrhae, wedding tokens, or unity coins) are wedding paraphernalia used in Christian wedding ceremonies in Spain, Latin American countries, and the Philippines. The tradition is also followed, with varying names and customs, in other countries and communities bearing degrees of Hispanic influence. Traditionally, in Spain and Latin America, it is made up of thirteen gold coins presented in an ornate box or chest; in the Philippines, it is in an ornate basket or pouch. After being blessed by a priest, they are given or presented by the groom to the bride.

== Origins and representation ==
The word arras is Spanish, meaning "earnest money" (arrhae, plural of arrha), "bride price", or "bride wealth". The custom of using coins in weddings can be traced to a number of places, including Spain and Rome. The book An Introductory Dictionary of Theology and Religious Studies claims that origin of arras was from gold rings or coins in Visigothic law, whereas the Sex and Society claims the practice emerged from Frankish marriage ceremonies. The ancient Roman custom includes the act of breaking gold or silver equally into two pieces. This signifies the promise to marry by two individuals. The Spanish tradition of Mozarabic origin does not include treating the set of coins as a representation of the bridal dowry or a way of hastening prosperity.

As to the number, the thirteen coins placed inside the decorated boxes, pouches, or trays represent the twelve months of the year and the poor (the thirteenth). Perhaps trying to make sense of it all, Reynolds & Witte wrote that the Franks during their weddings gave 13 pennies while the Spanish gave coins or some sort of marriage gift. These two practices then merged in the 11th century.

The thirteen coins today have the alternative meaning of Jesus and the twelve apostles. The exchange of the coins represents the groom's promise to provide for his family and the bride's trust in his ability to do so.

In Filipino and Hispanic weddings, an "arrhae-bearer" or "coin-bearer” is included as a second page in the entourage, in addition to the ring bearer. Unlike the ring bearer, however, he carries the actual arrhae in its case on a cushion.

This optional Hispanic rite and its Spanish text was approved by the United States Conference of Catholic Bishops in 2010. In September 2016, an English language version was approved and placed in the English Order of Celebrating Matrimony, along with the wedding cord.

== Other usage ==
Depending on the culture in which this tradition is followed, the tradition of arras may be used on different occasions, although it is rare in most Hispanic countries. They may be used for quinceañeras, debutante balls for young ladies, and at bat mitzvahs.

In 1833 Balzac wrote (Eugénie Grandet):

The “marriage dozen” is an old custom sacredly preserved and still in force in many parts of central France. In Berry and in Anjou, when a young girl marries, her family, or that of the husband, must give her a purse, in which they place, according to their means, twelve pieces, or twelve dozen pieces, or twelve hundred pieces of gold. The poorest shepherd-girl never marries without her dozen, be it only a dozen coppers. They still tell in Issoudun of a certain “dozen” presented to a rich heiress, which contained a hundred and forty-four portugaises d’or. Pope Clement VII., uncle of Catherine de’ Medici, gave her when he married her to Henri II. a dozen antique gold medals of priceless value.

== Other definitions ==
In legal terminology, an arras is a civil law contract. Legally, it could also mean money or items with value given by a buyer to a vendor. The purpose of giving such a payment is to provide an evidence of "contract earnest". It is usually part of a pre-contract.

== Bibliography ==
- Espín, Orlando O.; Nickoloff, James B. (2007). An introductory dictionary of theology and religious studies (2007 ed.). Liturgical Press. ISBN 978-0-8146-5856-7. - Total pages: 1521
- Kerber, K.L. (2007). Sex and Society. Global Vision.
- Reynolds, Lyndon; Witte, John (2007). To have and to hold: marrying and its documentation in Western Christendom, 400-1600 (2007 ed.). Cambridge University Press. ISBN 978-0-521-86736-8. - Total pages: 519
- Wainwright, Geoffrey; Tucker, Karen Beth Westerfield (2006). The Oxford history of Christian worship (2006 ed.). Oxford University Press. ISBN 0-19-513886-4. - Total pages: 916
