= Wedding cord =

Catholic wedding ceremony equipment

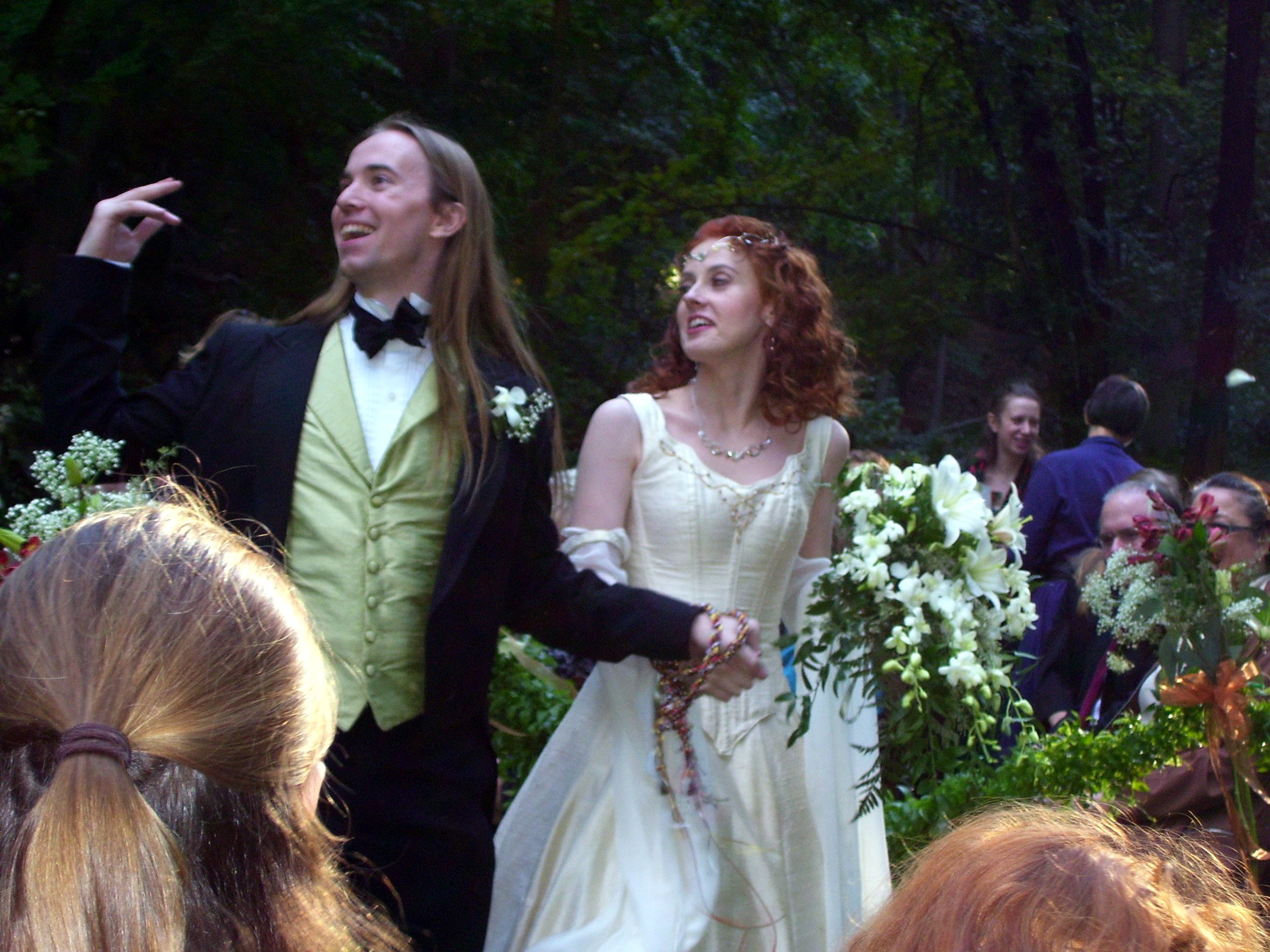
A newly wedded couple carry wedding cords in their hands

The traditional wedding cord, also known as the "wedding lasso", is a piece of paraphernalia used in some Catholic wedding ceremonies. It is actually a representation of a loop of rosary beads made out of white satin or silk. During the wedding proper, this is traditionally formed into a figure-of-eight shape, and then placed around the neck areas of the bride and the groom after they have made their wedding vows, and are already kneeling on pillows for the pronouncement of a wedding prayer. This cord symbolizes lifetime unity or the everlasting union of the bride and groom when they officially become husband and wife, as well as a symbol of marital protection; while the loops formed signifies their love for one another. After the wedding, this marital twine is typically kept by the bride as a wedding souvenir. Use of the traditional wedding cord for weddings is common in Hispanic countries such as Mexico, the Philippines, and Spain.

== Wedding cord ritual ==
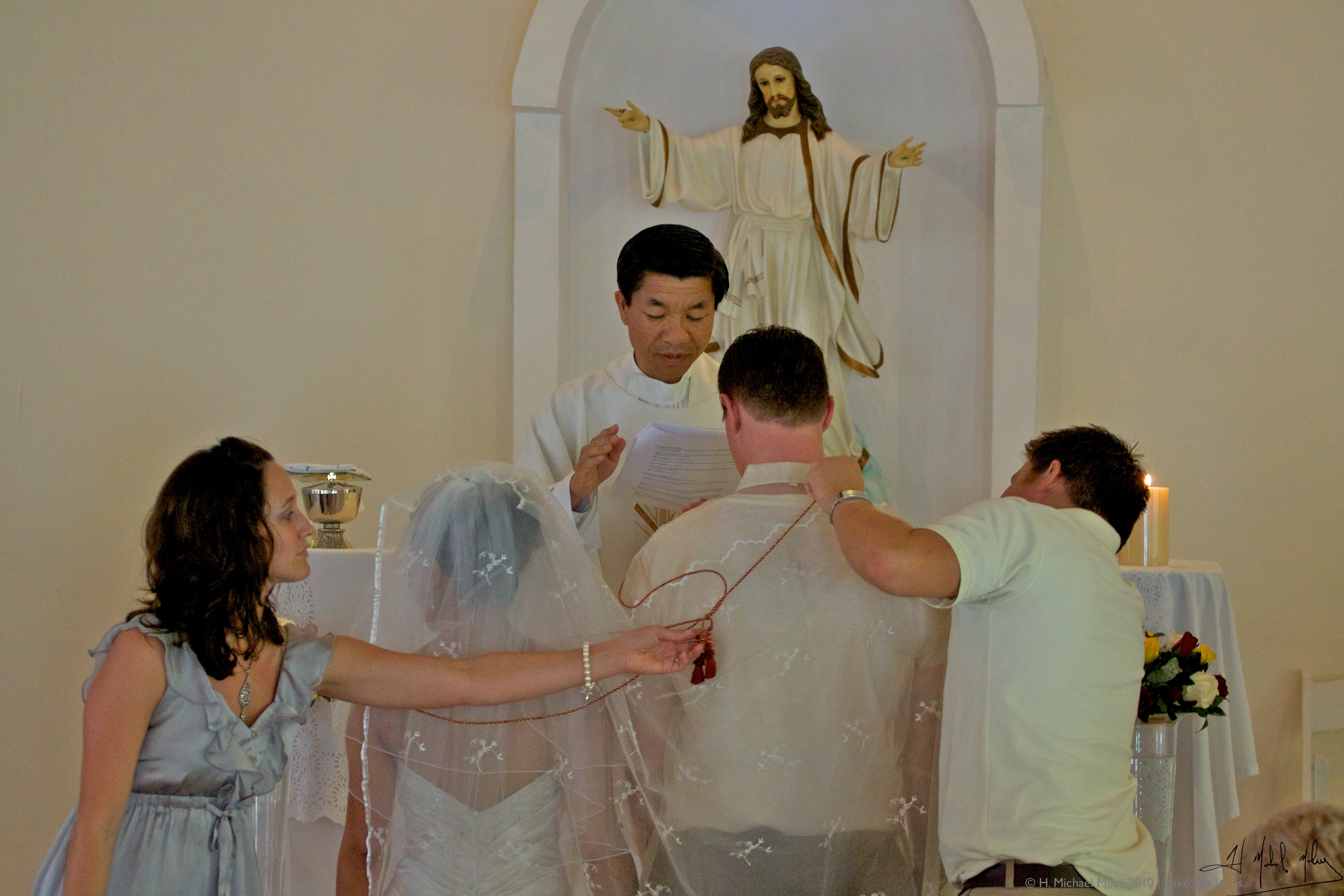
Wedding cord ceremony

After shrouding the bride and groom with the wedding veils, a pair of wedding participants is assigned in placing the wedding cord around the couple, with the groom being the first to be "lassoed" or "looped" by it at the shoulder area. The cord is held in place by means of pins. In other wedding ceremonies, the wedding cord is tied around the couple's wrists. The wedding cord stays on and around the couple until the wedding mass or religious service is finished. Then, it is removed by the same pair of wedding participants who were assigned to place the loop around the couple. The significance of the "lassoing" is to symbolize the unification of the couple in matrimony for their entire lives.

On the other hand, the ritual for the cord of three strands is performed by the bride and the groom. The groom holds the end of the cord that has a metal ring, while the bride braids the strands together. The braiding is done while an explanation of the significance of the braiding ritual is being read, or while a wedding music is being played, or while a wedding song is being chanted. The resulting braid is kept in place temporarily by a rubber band, and then permanently by a gold thread. The loop can signify the sacramental union itself or simply the, "yoke of marriage."

This Hispanic tradition in Spanish was approved by the U.S. Conference of Catholic Bishops in 2010. In September 2016, an English language version was approved and placed in the English Order of Celebrating Matrimony along with the arras.
