= Justiniano Asunción =

Filipino painter

- Born: September 26, 1816
- Died: 1901 (aged 84–85)
- Occupation: Filipino painter

Justiniano Asuncion (September 26, 1816 – October 23, 1896), also known as Capitan Ting, was a Filipino painter.

== Background ==
Asuncion was one of the leading Filipino painters in the 19th century. In 1834, he studied at Escuela de Dibujo, where he obtained his skills in painting. Sometime in 1855, he became capitan municipal of Santa Cruz, Manila. Asuncion was the painter of the famous Coronation of the Virgin, the Virgin of Antipolo, Filomena Asuncion, and Romana A. Carillo. He produced life-sized paintings of San Agustin, San Geronimo, San Antonio, and San Gregorio Magno which were kept at the Santa Cruz Church before the World War II. These precious canvases were destroyed when the Japanese bombarded the church in February 1945. His works mirror the mannerism of that period – the first 75 years of the 19th century. The portraitists of those time carefully delineated features of the head; the hands and other minor details with linear accuracy; usually disregarding tonal values and emphasizing hardness of effect. The University of Santo Tomas Museum owns one of Asuncion’s paintings, dated February 1862. An unsigned portrait of Fr. Melchor Garcia de Sampedro at the UST Museum is said to be the work of Asuncion. Most of his other works are kept as national treasures at the Central Bank of the Philippines and the Philippines Museum. On September 12, 1983, at the façade of Santa Cruz Church in Manila, a marker was installed in his honor.

== Personal life and death ==
Asuncion is the tenth child of Mariano Kagalitan, Sr. (later Asuncion). His siblings are: Manuel (born 1792), Antonio (1794), Victoria (1796), Mamerta (1798), Justo (1800), Mariano, Jr. (1802), Epifanio (1806), Ambrosio (1808), Pascula (1811), Leoncio (1813), Canuta (1819), Theodoro (unknown).

Justiniano married Justina Farafina Gomez and had six children: Benita, Zacarias, Marcelina, Jacobo, Gabriel and Martiniana. His grandsons from Zacaris Asuncion include Adonis Asuncion (mayor of Bulan, Sorsogon), Justiniano Asuncion (founder of the oldest Greek-letter fraternity in Asia, Upsilon Sigma Phi), Kenerino (founder of the first private school and oldest existing high school in Bulan, Sorsogon, Southern Luzon Institute-Kenerino Ramirez Asuncion Memorial School).

His grandson from Leoncio is Filipino artist Rafael Asuncion.

He died on October 23, 1896 at the age of 80.

== Works ==
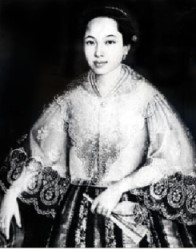
Dolores Paterno, c. 1870 by Justiniano Asuncion

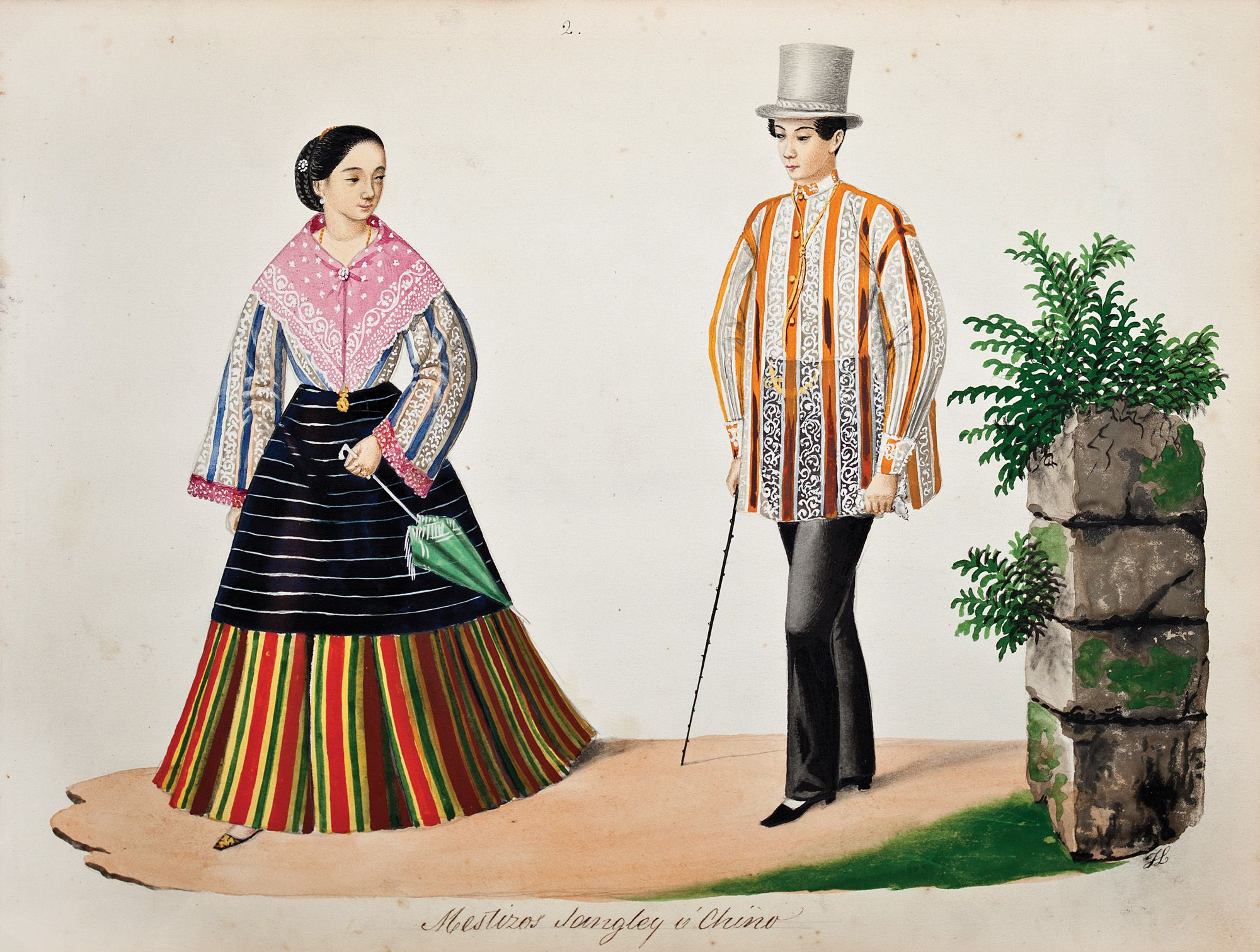
Chinese Filipino mestizos (Mestizos de Sangley y Chino) Tipos del País Watercolor, c. 1841

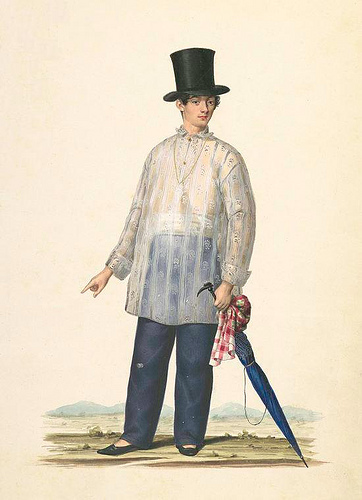
Illustration of a Filipino mestizo, c. 1841

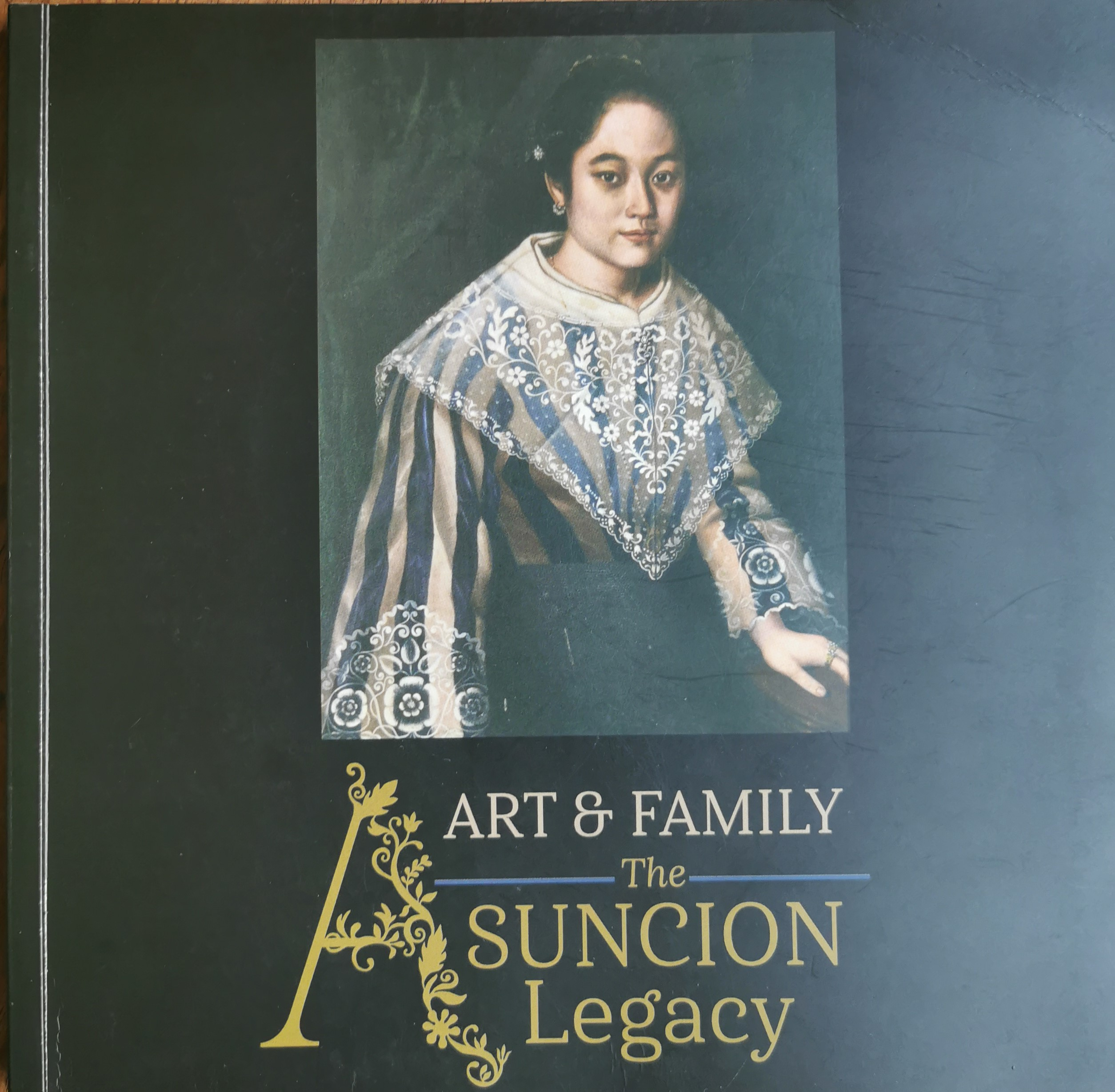
Exhibition: The Asuncion Legacy, Ayala Museum, August 8, 2017 to January 14, 2018

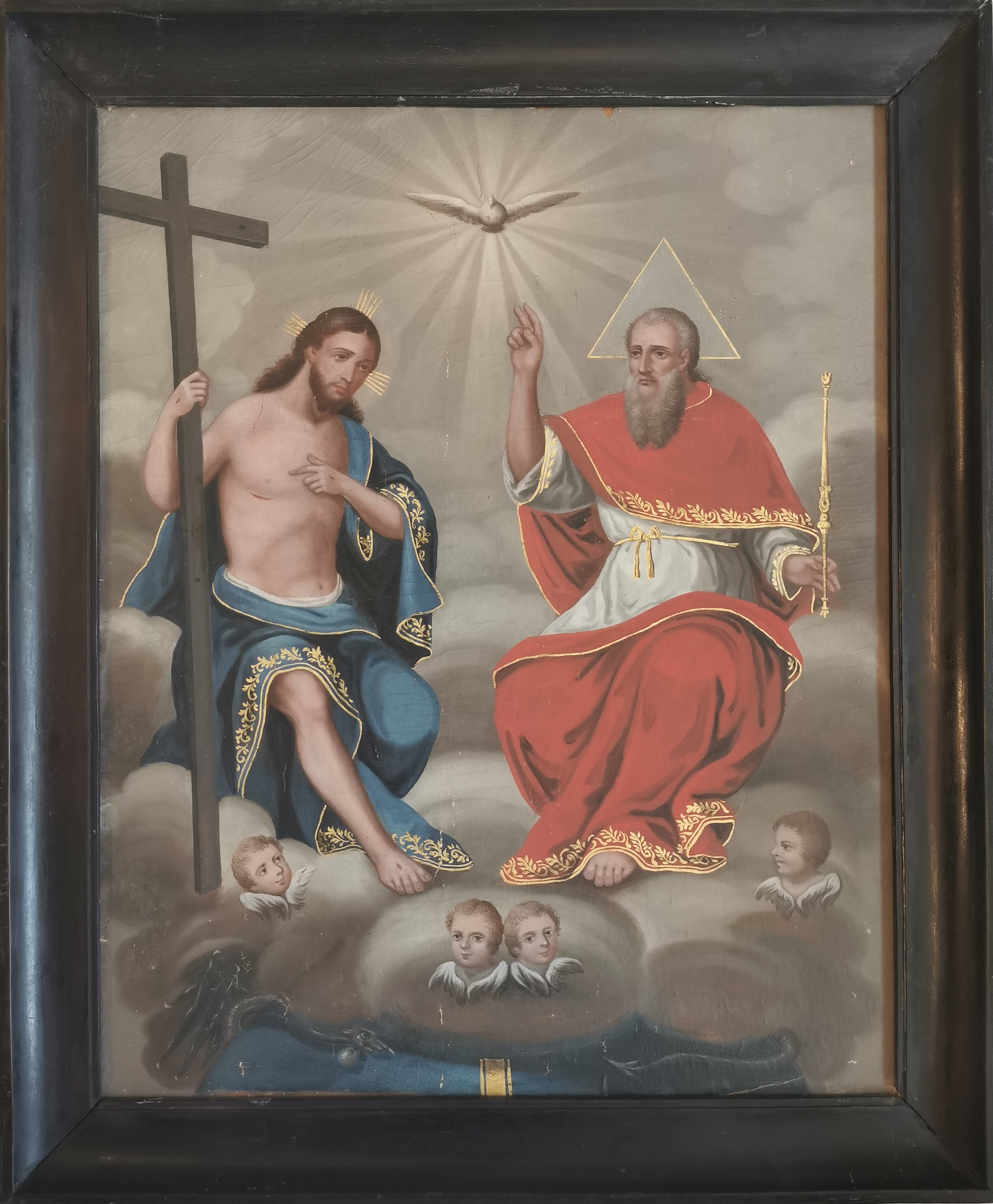
La Santisima Trinidad (The Holy Trinity) c 1870 by Justiniano Asuncion

== See also ==
- Damián Domingo
- José Honorato Lozano
- Letras y figuras
- Juan Luna
- Fernando Amorsolo
- Fabián de la Rosa
- Félix Resurrección Hidalgo
- Tipos del Pais
- Boxer Codex
- Isabelo Tampinco
