= Tipos del País =

Style of watercolor painting in the Philippines

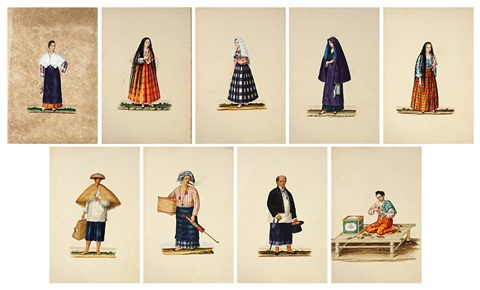
Tipos del País by Justiniano Asuncion

Tipos del País, literally meaning Types of the Country, is a Filipino Miniature painting of watercolor method that shows the different types of inhabitants in the Philippines in their different native costumes that show their social status and occupation during colonial times.

== History ==
During the 19th century, secular subject matter in painting the Philippines increased extensively. With more tourists, ilustrados and foreigners demanding souvenirs and decorations from the country, Tipos del País developed in painting. Damián Domingo was the most popular artist who worked in this style.

== Gallery ==
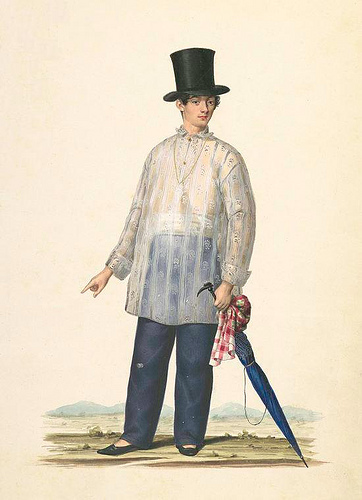
Illustration of a Filipino mestizo by Justiniano Asuncion

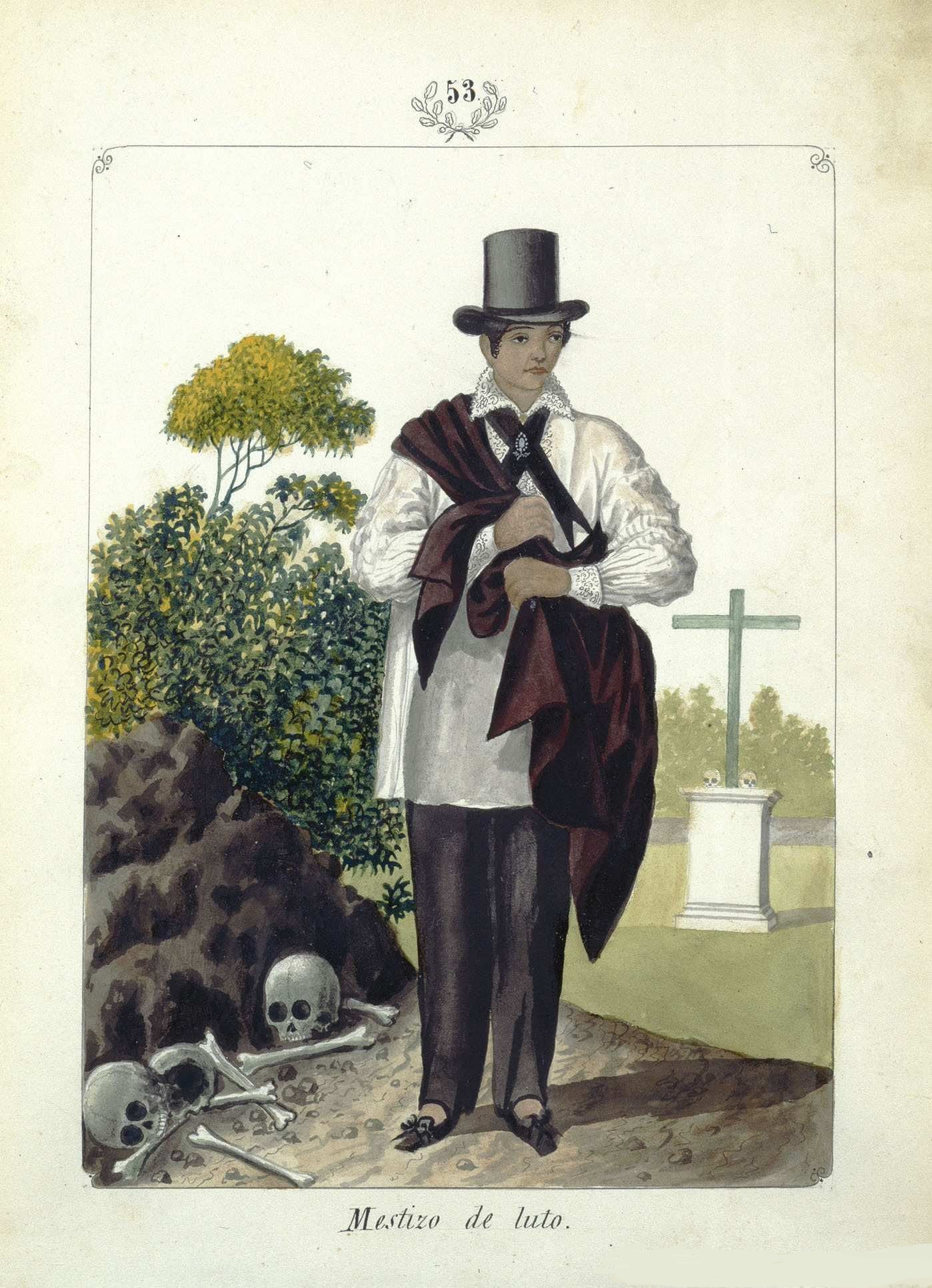
"Mestizo de luto" (A mourning mestizo) by José Honorato Lozano

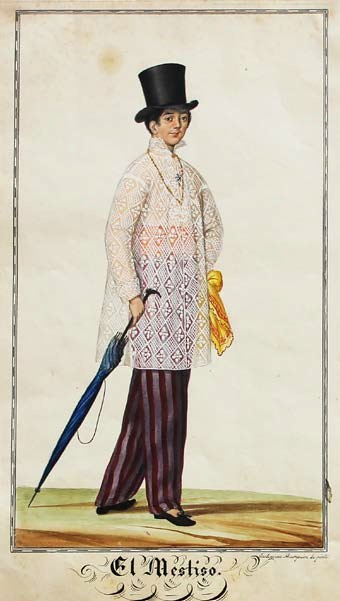
"El Mestiso" (A Filipino Mestizo) by Justiniano Asuncion

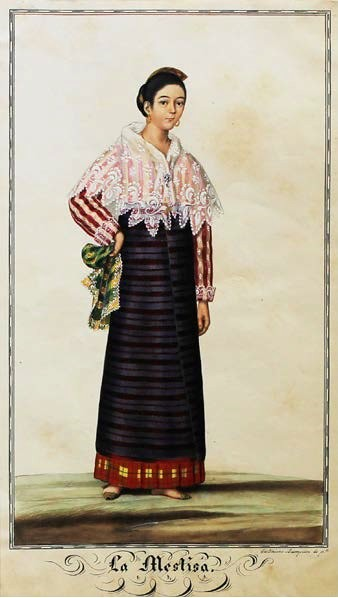
"La Mestisa" (A Filipina Mestiza) by Justiniano Asuncion

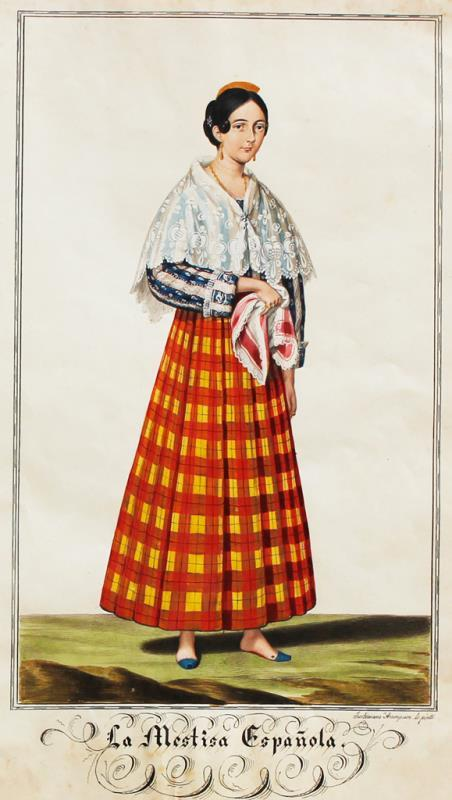
"La Mestisa Española" (A Spanish Mestiza Filipina) by Justiniano Asuncion

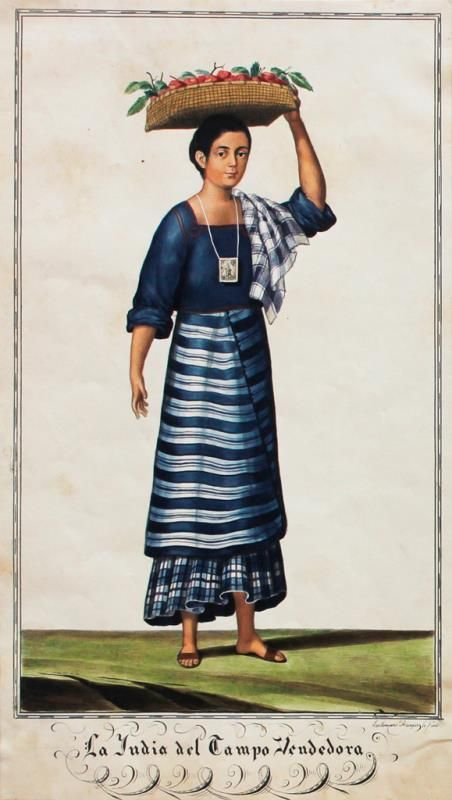
"La Yndia del Campo Tendedora" (A Native Filipina Field Tender / Farmer) by Justiniano Asuncion

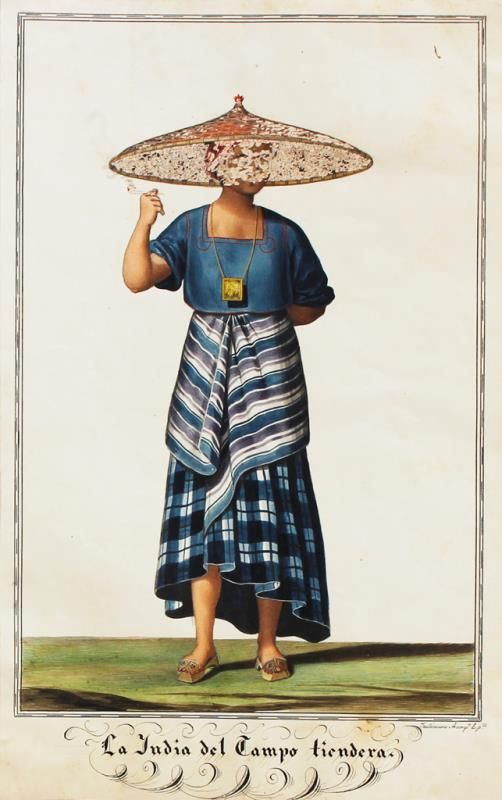
"La Yndia del Campo tiendera" (A Native Filipina Rural Merchant) by Justiniano Asuncion

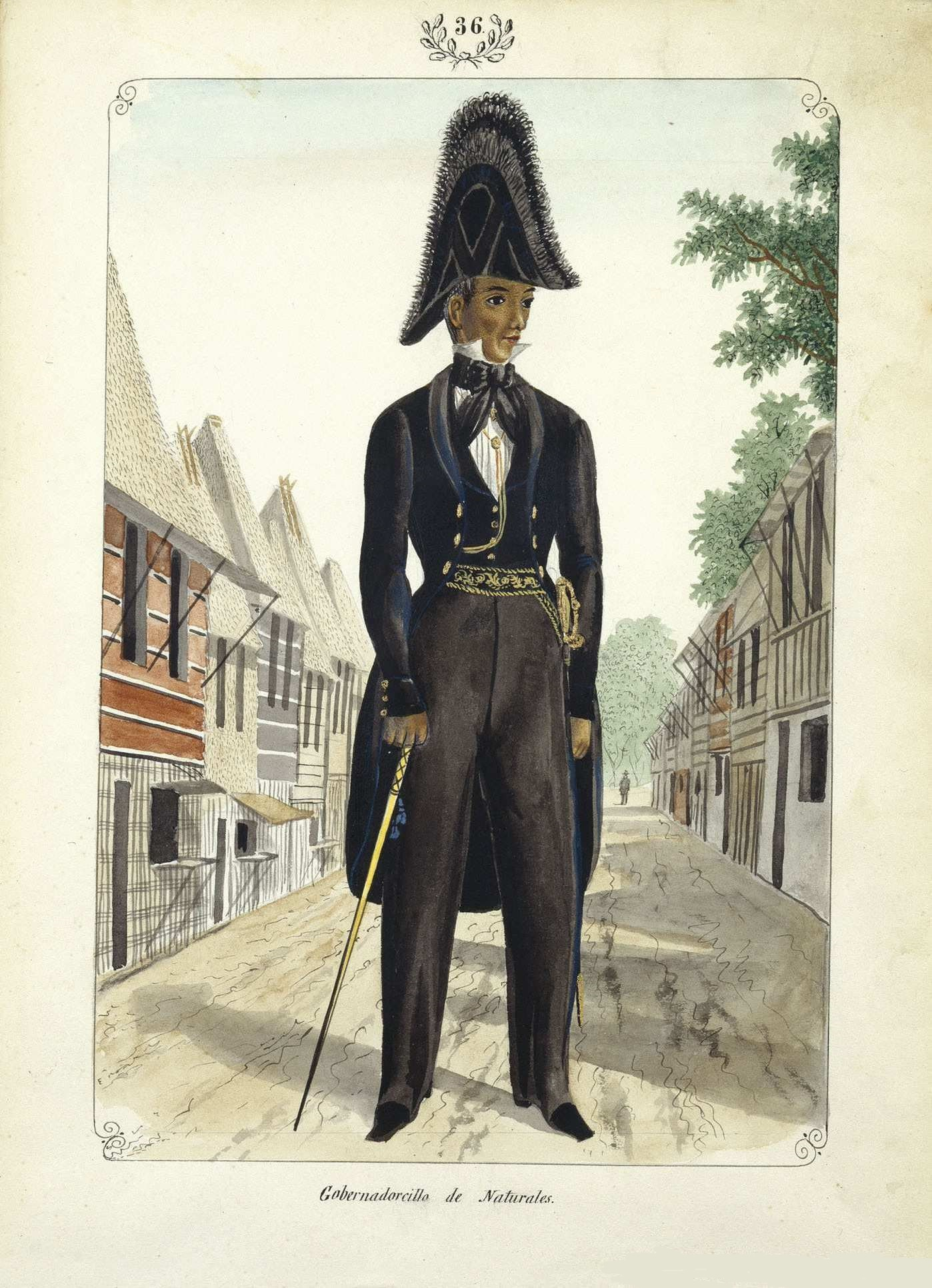
"Gobernadorcillo de Naturales" (Native Governor) by José Honorato Lozano

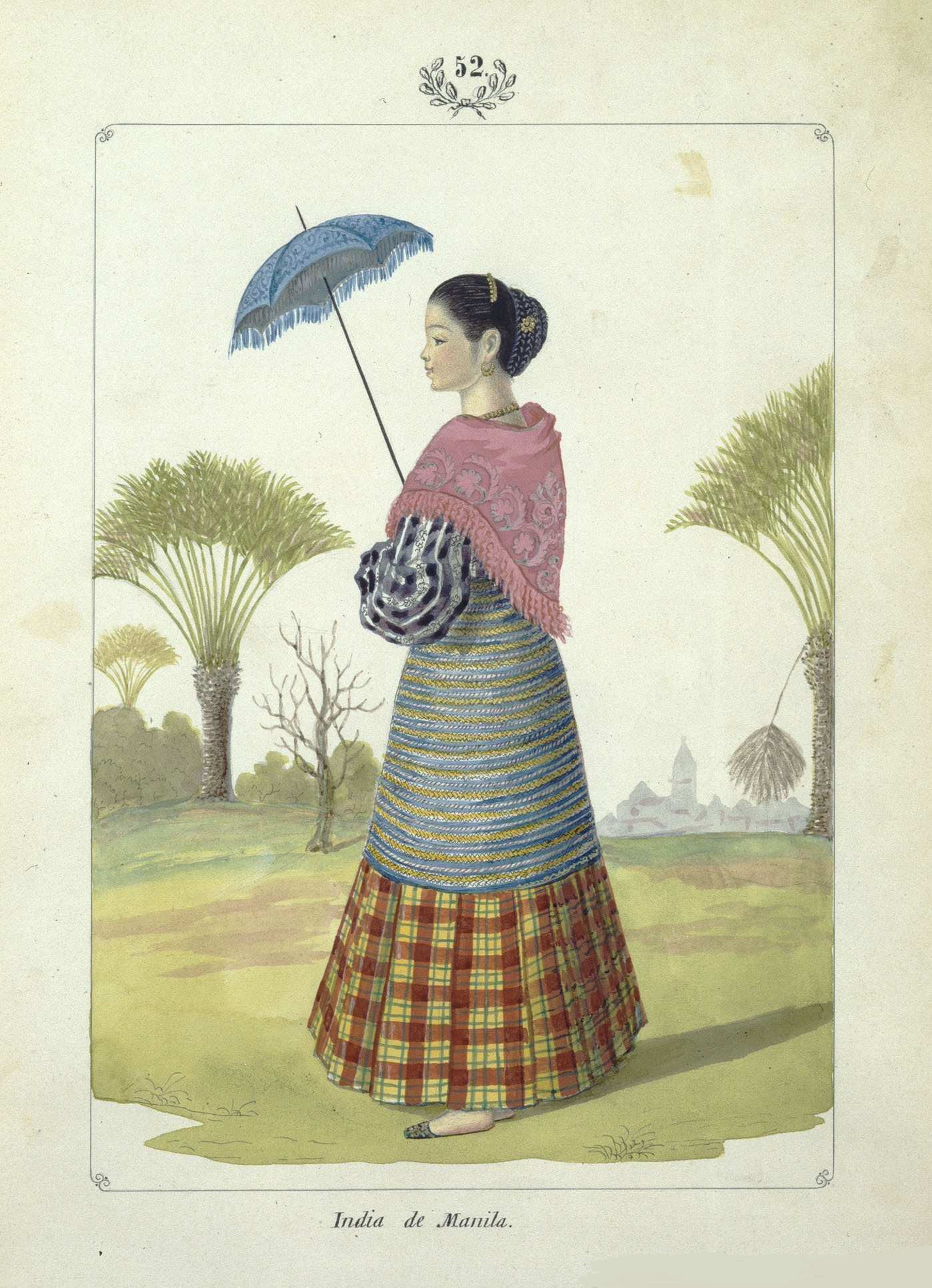
"India de Manila" (Native Filipina of Manila) by José Honorato Lozano

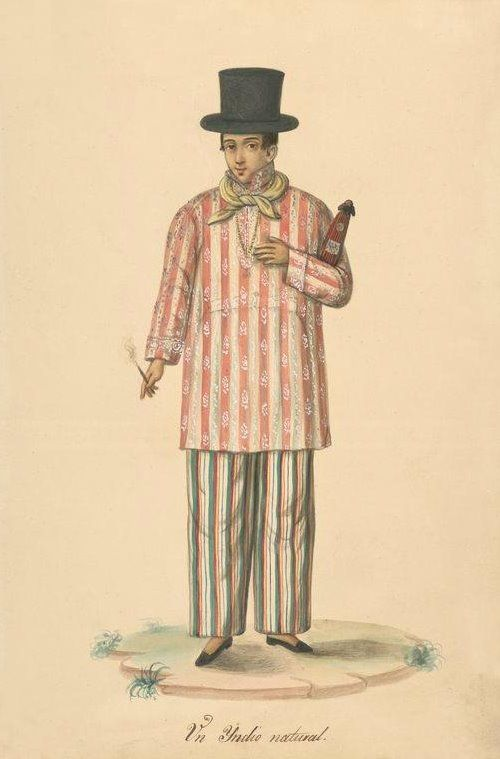
"Un Yndio natural" (A Native Filipino) by José Honorato Lozano

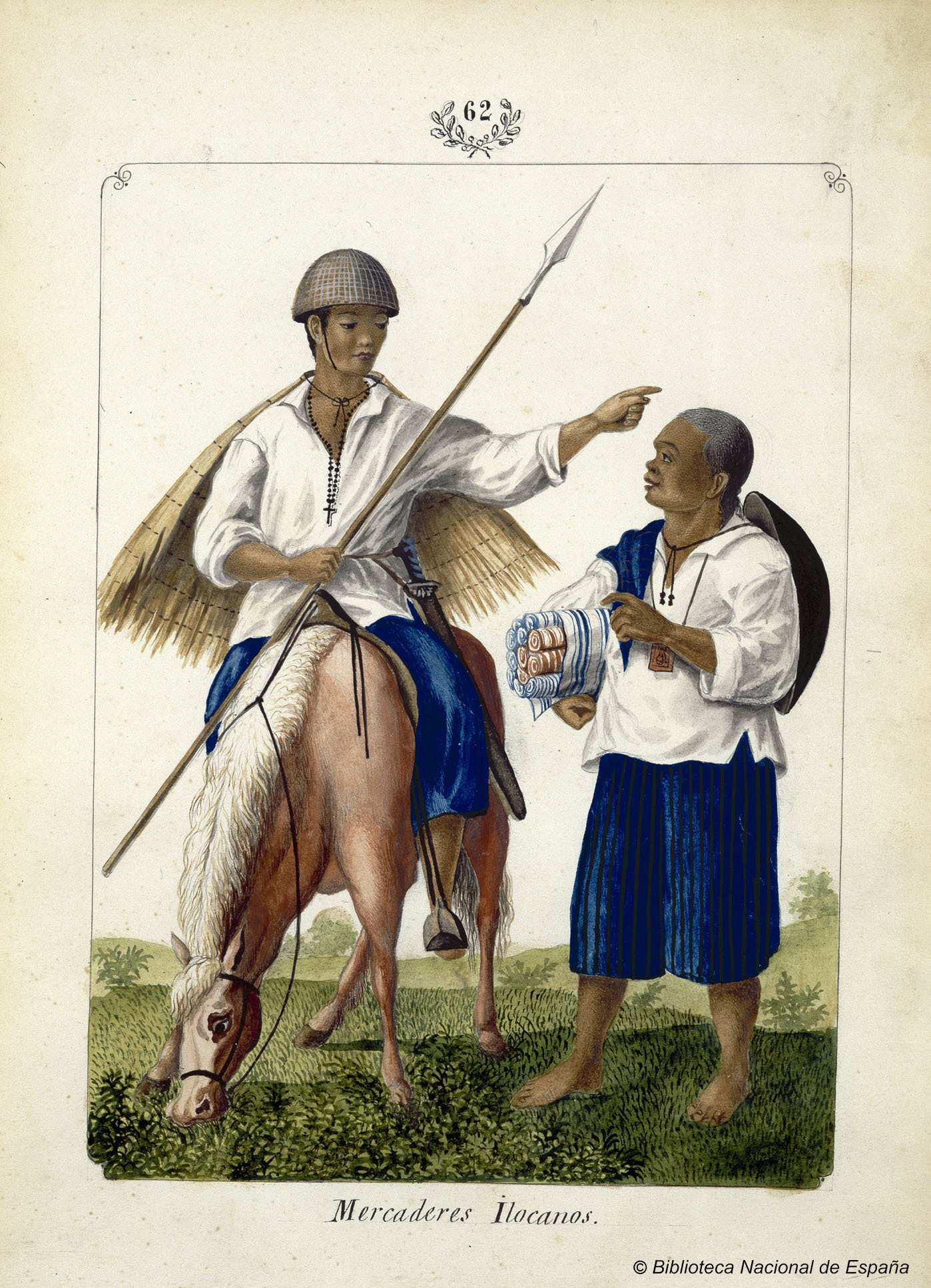
Mercaderes Ilocanos (Ilocano Merchants) by José Honorato Lozano

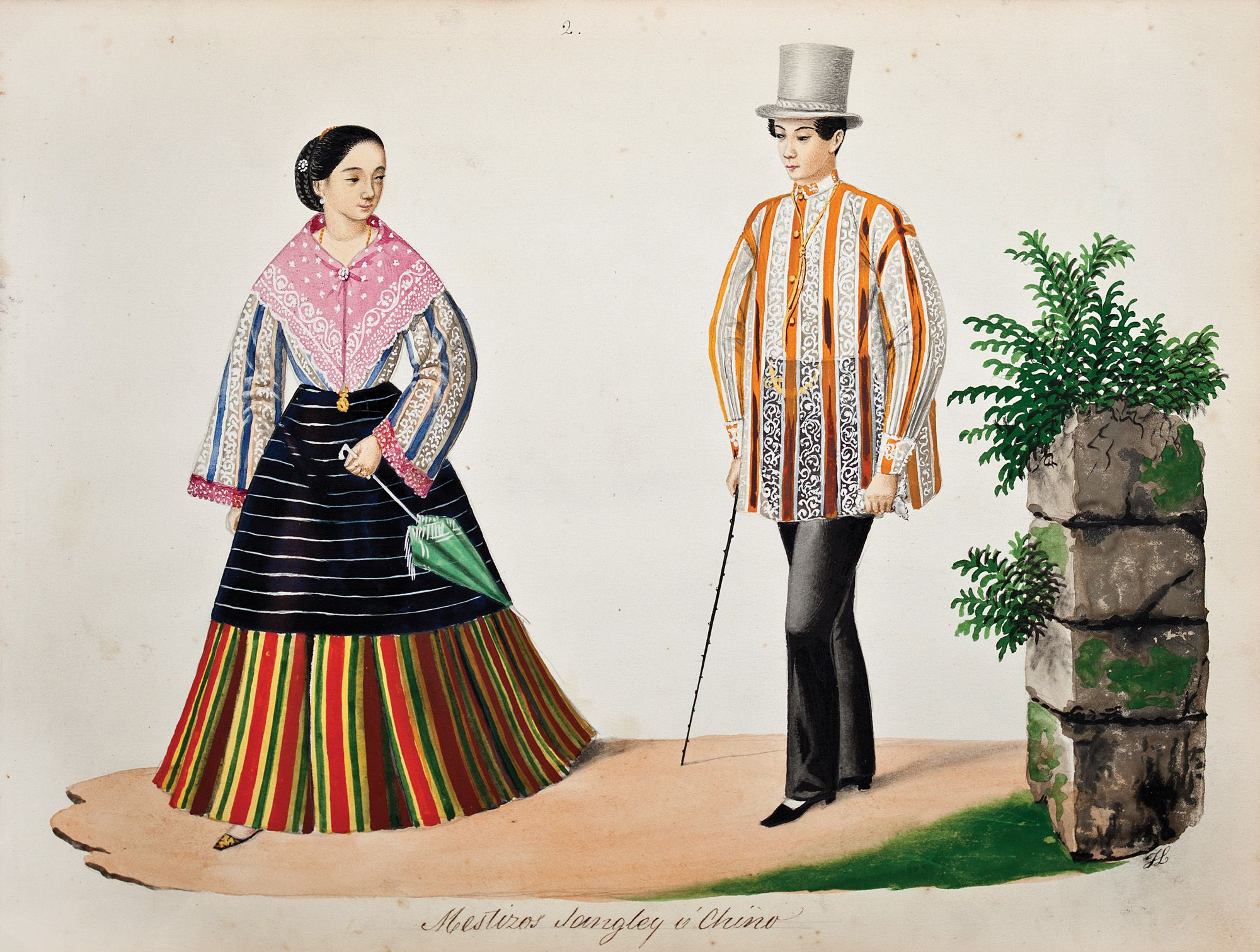
"Mestizos Sangley y Chino" (Sangley Chinese-Filipino Mestizos) by Justiniano Asuncion

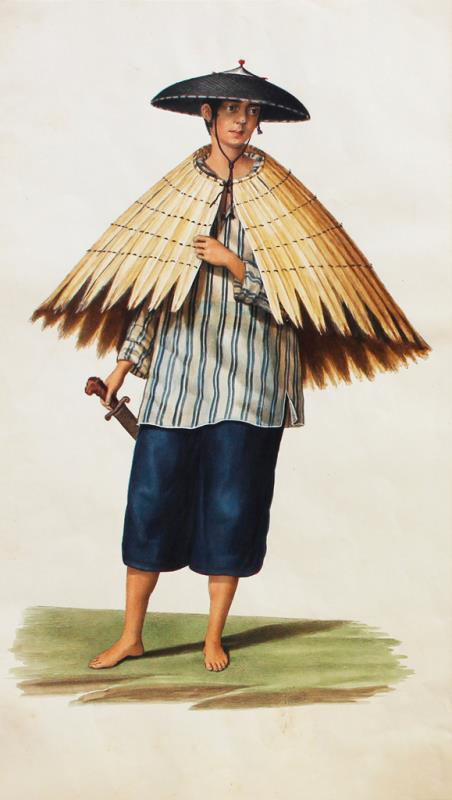
Filipino Peasant with coat & salacot by Justiniano Asuncion

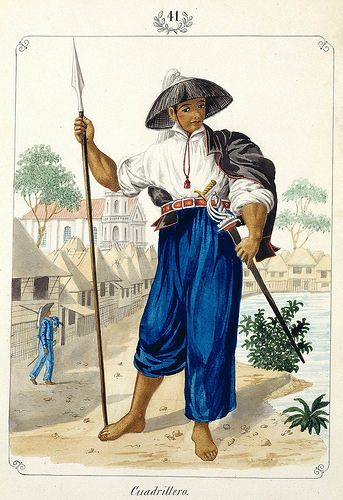
Cuadrillero by José Honorato Lozano

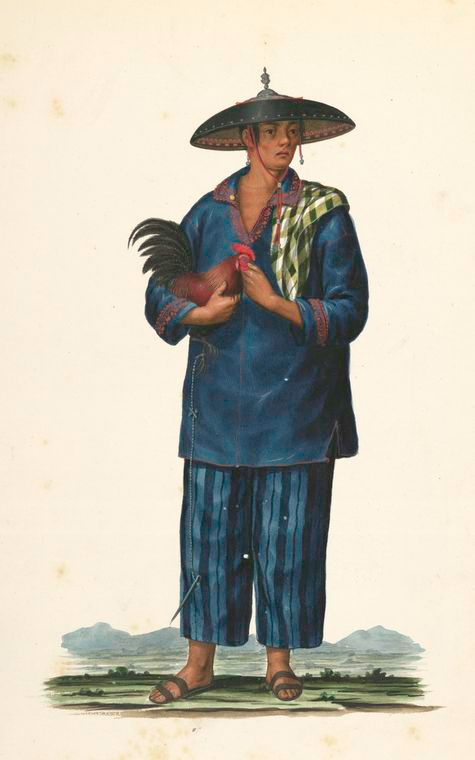
Filipino Peasant with salacot & rooster by Justiniano Asuncion

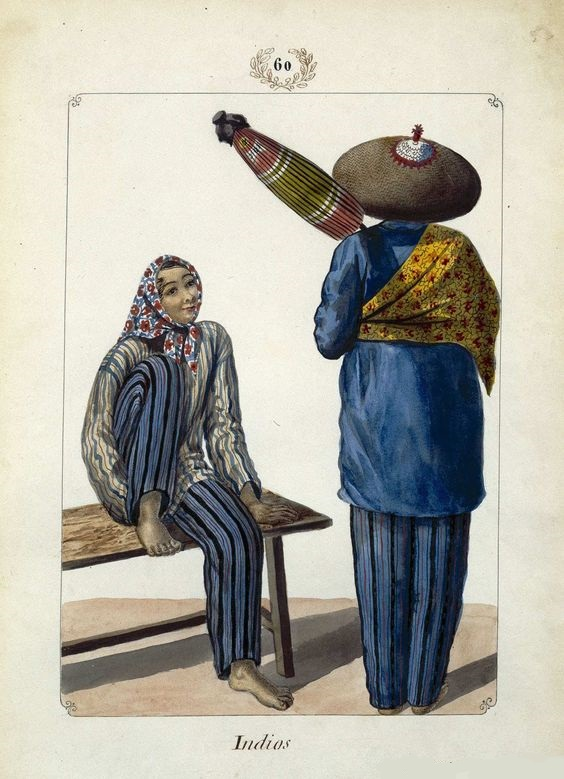
Indios (Native Filipinos) by José Honorato Lozano

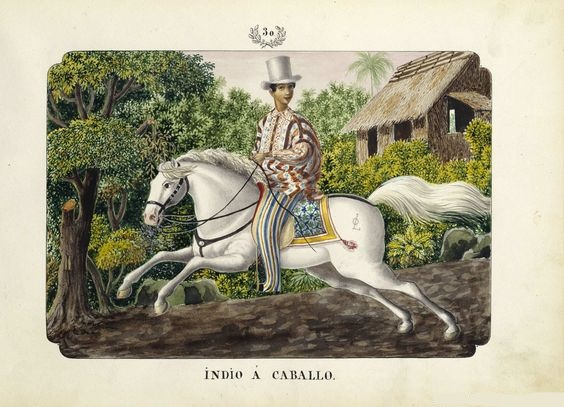
Indio A Caballo (Native Filipino On A Horse) by José Honorato Lozano

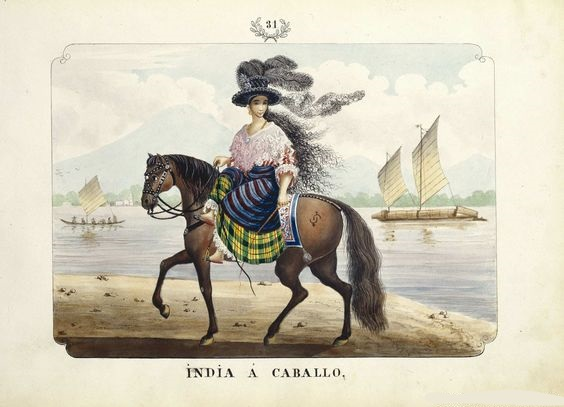
India A Caballo (Native Filipina On A Horse) by José Honorato Lozano

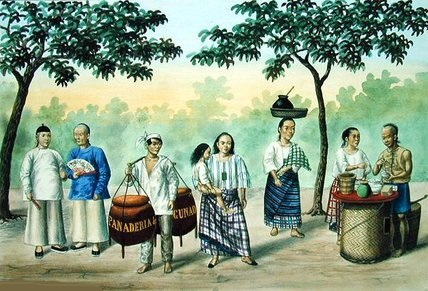
A Scene In Town by José Honorato Lozano

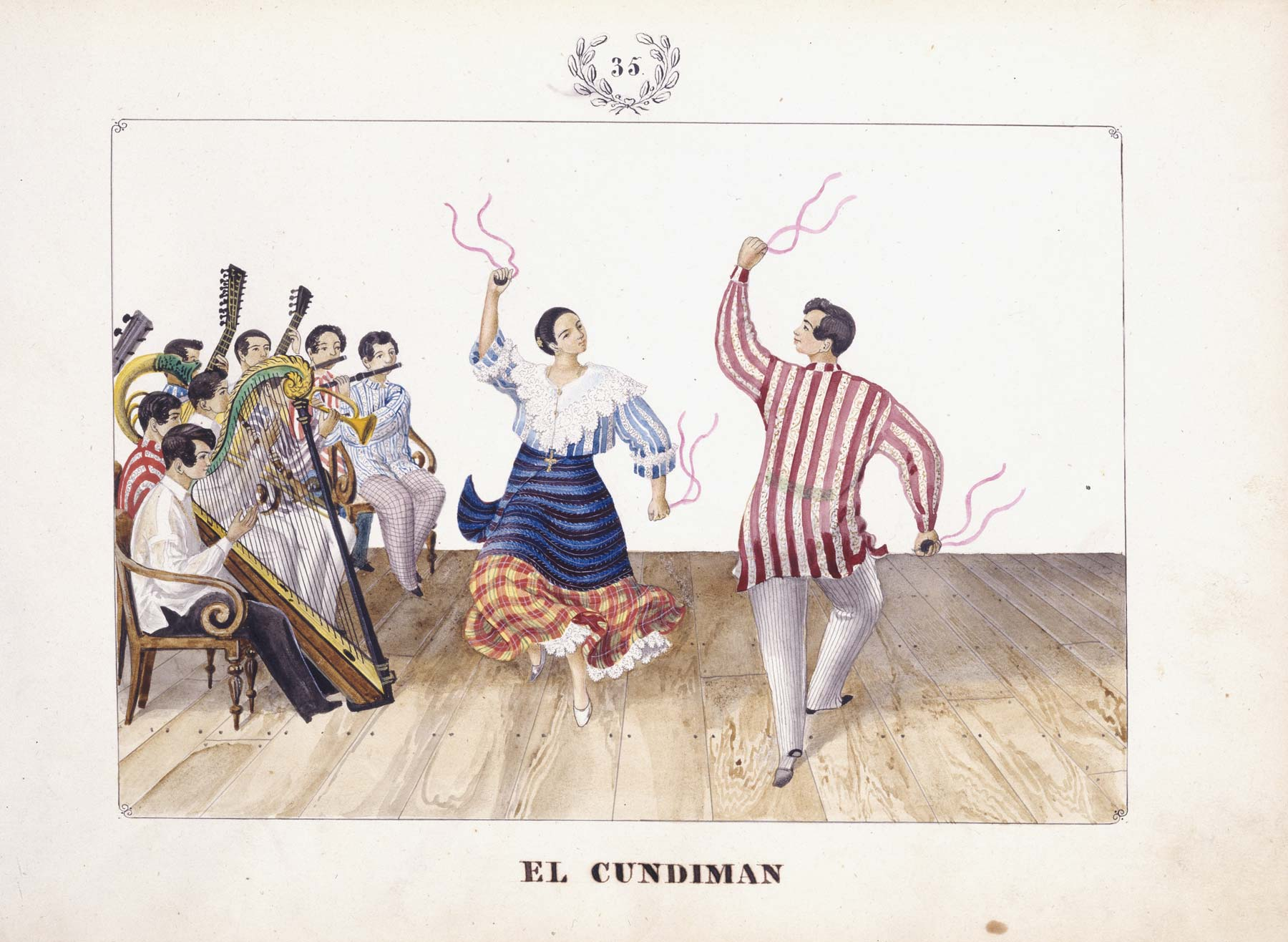
El Cundiman (Kundiman) by José Honorato Lozano

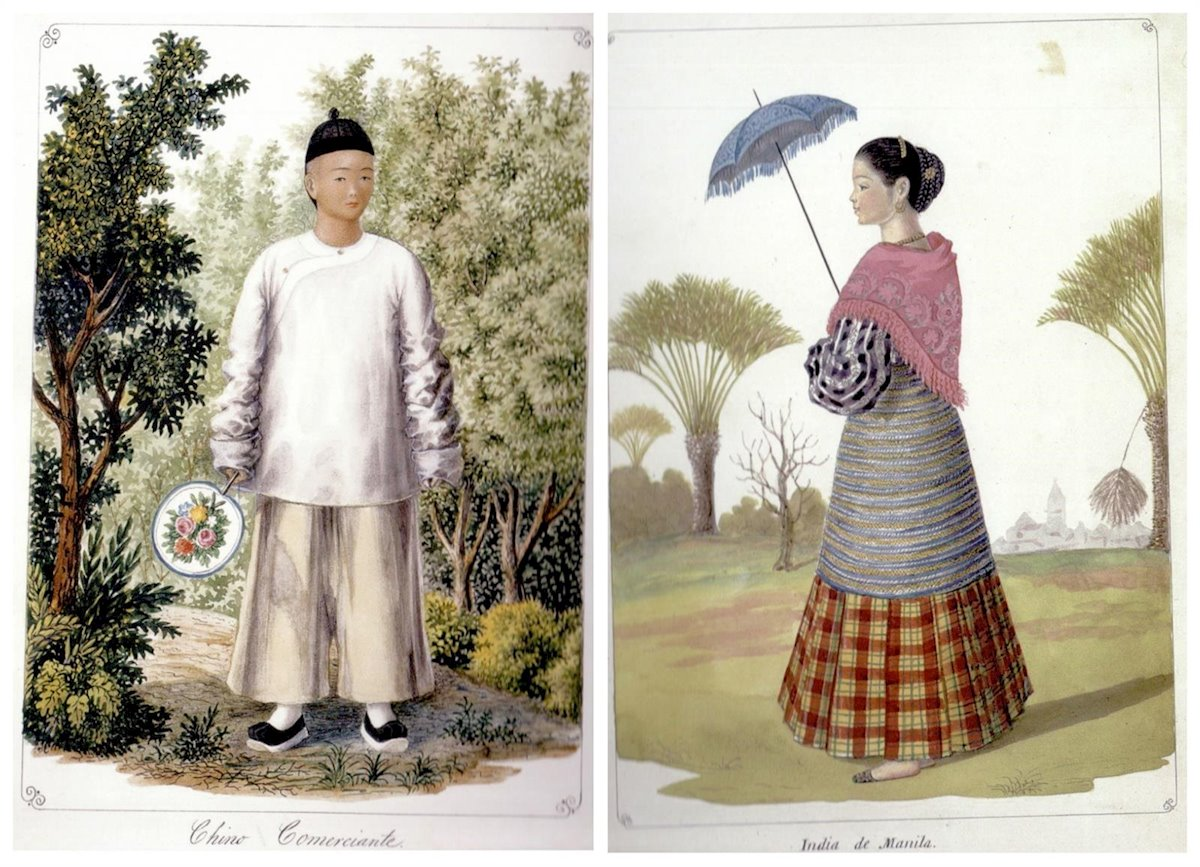
Chino Comerciante (Sangley Merchant) & India de Manila (Native Filipina of Manila) by José Honorato Lozano

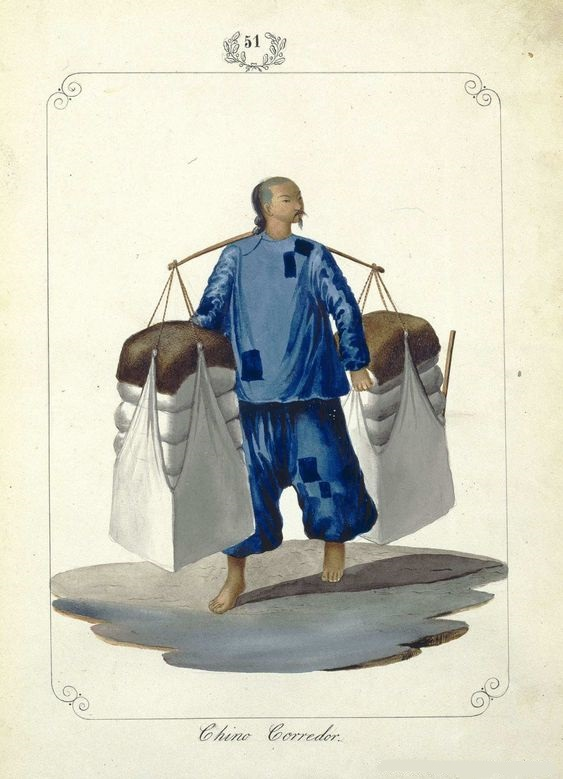
Chino Corredor (Chinese Runner/Deliveryman) by José Honorato Lozano

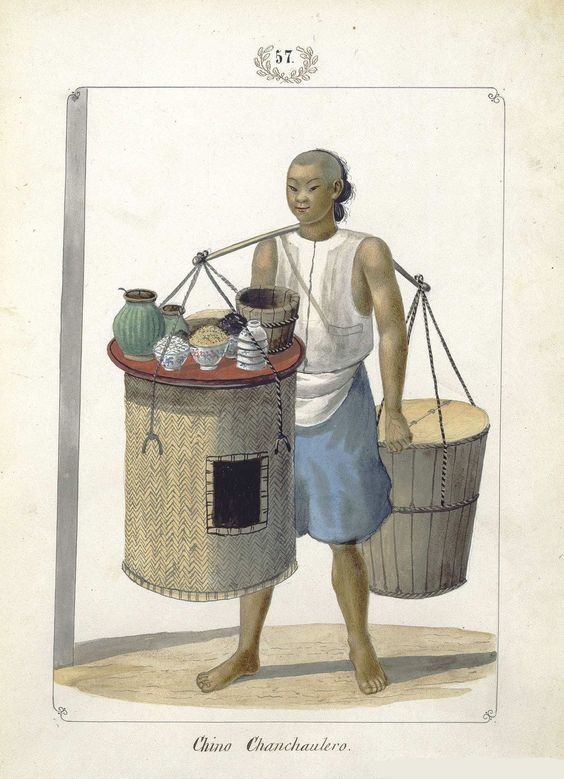
Chino Chanchaulero by José Honorato Lozano

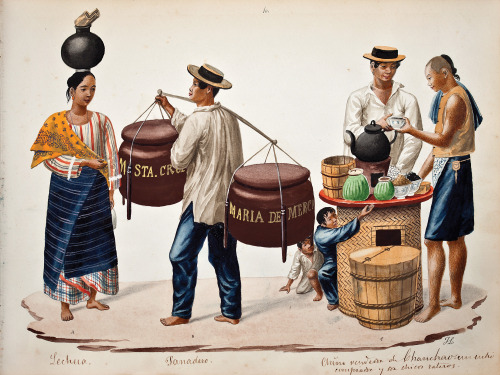
Tipos del País Scene by José Honorato Lozano

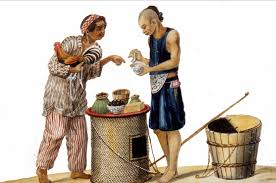
(A Native Filipino & Sangley) by José Honorato Lozano

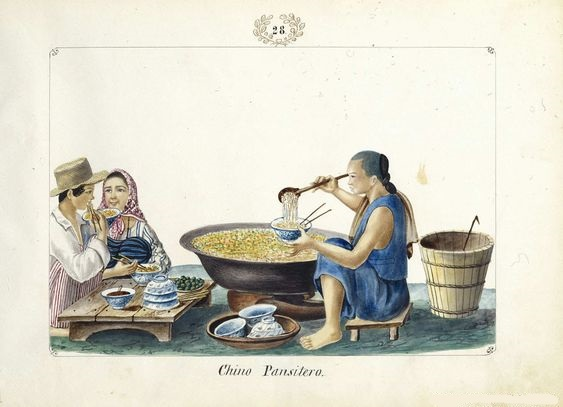
Chino Pansitero (Chinese Pancit Vendor) by José Honorato Lozano

== See also ==
- Letras y figuras
- Códice Casanatense
