= José Honorato Lozano =

Filipino painter

- Born: 1815 or 1821; Manila, Captaincy General of the Philippines
- Died: 1885
- Known for: Painting
- Movement: Letras y figuras

José Honorato Lozano (1815 or 1821-1885) was a Filipino painter born in Manila. He is best known as the pioneering practitioner of the art form known as Letras y figuras, in which the letters of a patron's name is composed primarily by contoured arrangements of human figures surrounded by vignettes of scenes in Manila - an art form that may have derived loosely from illuminated manuscripts. Santiago Pilar, an authority on 19th-century paintings, described Lozano's works as "some of the most quaint and endlessly fascinating relics of Filipino culture in Spanish times".

Lozano was the son of a lighthouse keeper at Manila Bay. He grew up in Sampaloc, Manila outside the walled city of Intramuros. A local commentator, Rafael Diaz Arenas, remarked as early as 1850 that Lozano was "a watercolourist without rival". Lozano also painted in the conventional costumbrista tradition as a means of supplying the demand for souvenirs of Manila to foreign visitors. He also painted in oils and the Spanish government commissioned him to depict episodes from the history of Spanish rule in the country to be displayed during a fiesta in the district of Santa Cruz, Manila in 1848.

José Maria A. Cariño, author of José Honorato Lozano: Filipinas 1847, surmises that Lozano may have been trained by Chinese painters or Filipino painters skilled in Chinese painting techniques.

A folio of Lozano's watercolors surfaced in a 1995 episode of Antiques Roadshow (the UK edition) with appraiser Peter Nahum. The album had been commissioned by Emile Nyssens, and was sold at Christie's in 1995 for 265,000 British pounds; and a Spanish marquesa by another—not unless there were two or three separate albums floating around in Europe. But that folio appraised by Nahum went on to sell for GBP240,000 at a later auction.

In 2021, Views of Manila (1850), a letras y figuras watercolor by Lozano that previously was in the collection of economic historian Benito J. Legarda was sold for a record PHP17.52 million (USD362,412.41), becoming the most expensive artwork sold by the artist internationally.

== See also ==
- Justiniano Asuncion
- Fabián de la Rosa
- Damián Domingo
- Juan Luna
- Fernando Amorsolo
- Boxer Codex
- Letras y figuras
- Tipos del Pais
- Félix Resurrección Hidalgo
- Isabelo Tampinco
- Bonifacio Arévalo
