= Damián Domingo =

Filipino painter (1796–1834)

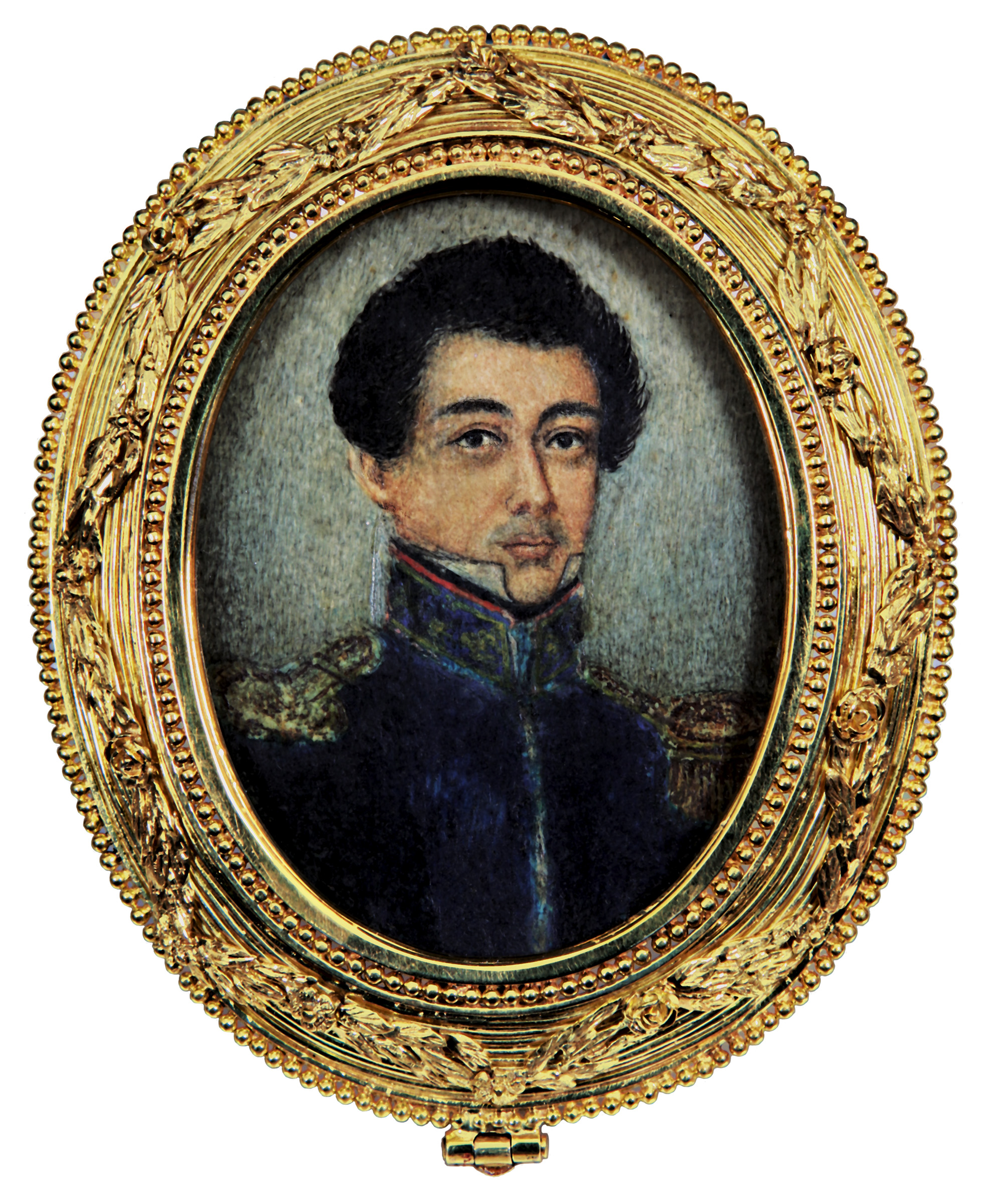
- Self-Portrait of Damián Domingo, Oil on ivory plate, Paulino and Hetty Que Collection
- Born: Damián Domingo y Gabor; February 12, 1796; Tondo, Manila, Captaincy General of the Philippines
- Died: July 27, 1834 (aged 38); Manila, Captaincy General of the Philippines
- Known for: Painter
- Notable work: Tipos del Pais
- Patrons: Sociedad Económica de los Amigos del País; Daniel Baboom

Damián Domingo y Gabor (February 12, 1796 – July 27, 1834) was the father of Philippine painting. Domingo established the official Philippine art academy in his residence in Tondo in 1821.

== Biography ==
Damian Domingo was born in Tondo, Manila, and is a Chinese Filipino mestizo. He began his career as a painter specializing in miniature portraits and religious imagery. He also created albums of illustrations of native costumes. This he did primarily to sell to collectors. Such skills made Domingo one of the most famous and sought-after artists of his time in the Philippines. Domingo is regarded highly in the history of Filipino art and is credited with establishing academic courses in art in the Philippines.

== Contribution to art ==
Damian Domingo's contribution to the development of art as an academic discipline in the Philippines was seminal. He took an important step toward his vision of making art more accessible in 1821, when he established a school for artists in his residence in Tondo. It was a major leap for the discipline in the Philippines. He also oversaw the growth and development of art as the director of the first official Philippine art academy. The academy was also possibly the first of its kind in all of Asia to teach the Western techniques of foreground, middle-ground, and background perspectives. The academy also explored other foreign artistic techniques, an approach that helped shape the careers of the new generation of Filipino artists. When another art school, named Academia de Dibujo, opened in 1823, Domingo was offered a teaching position by its founders, the Sociedad Económica de los Amigos del País (Royal Economic Society of the Friends of the Country). Domingo later went on to serve as the director of the academy.

== A new era ==
His term as director saw the introduction of non-discriminatory policies that conferred equal rights on the Indios, who until then had been mostly marginalized. Teaching techniques and the curriculum also underwent changes. The students began to be taught the techniques of drawing still life and the human form. The academy also trained students in colors and surfaces preparation and to paint in oil and aquarelle. The academy would have certainly reached new heights if it weren't for the premature death of Domingo, who died aged just 38. The academy wasn't able to maintain the high standards Domingo had set and subsequently closed in 1834. The few years that Domingo was at the academy did manage to produce some of the earliest Filipino artists trained in Western artistic traditions.

== Auction history ==
To date, few works by Domingo survive today with three full albums of the tipos del pais are known to exist with two held in two prominent private collections in the Philippines, while a fully signed album dated between 1827 and 1832 by Domingo previously in the collection of American businessman Edward E. Ayer that was subsequently donated to the Newberry Library.

In 2019, an undated yet signed work by Domingo from the tipos del pais series previously from a private collection in the United States: Un Indio Noble de Manila sold for a record PHP3.74 million (US$71,824.44) at Leon Gallery in the Philippines, becoming the most expensive artwork sold by the artist internationally.

== Paintings by Damián Domingo ==
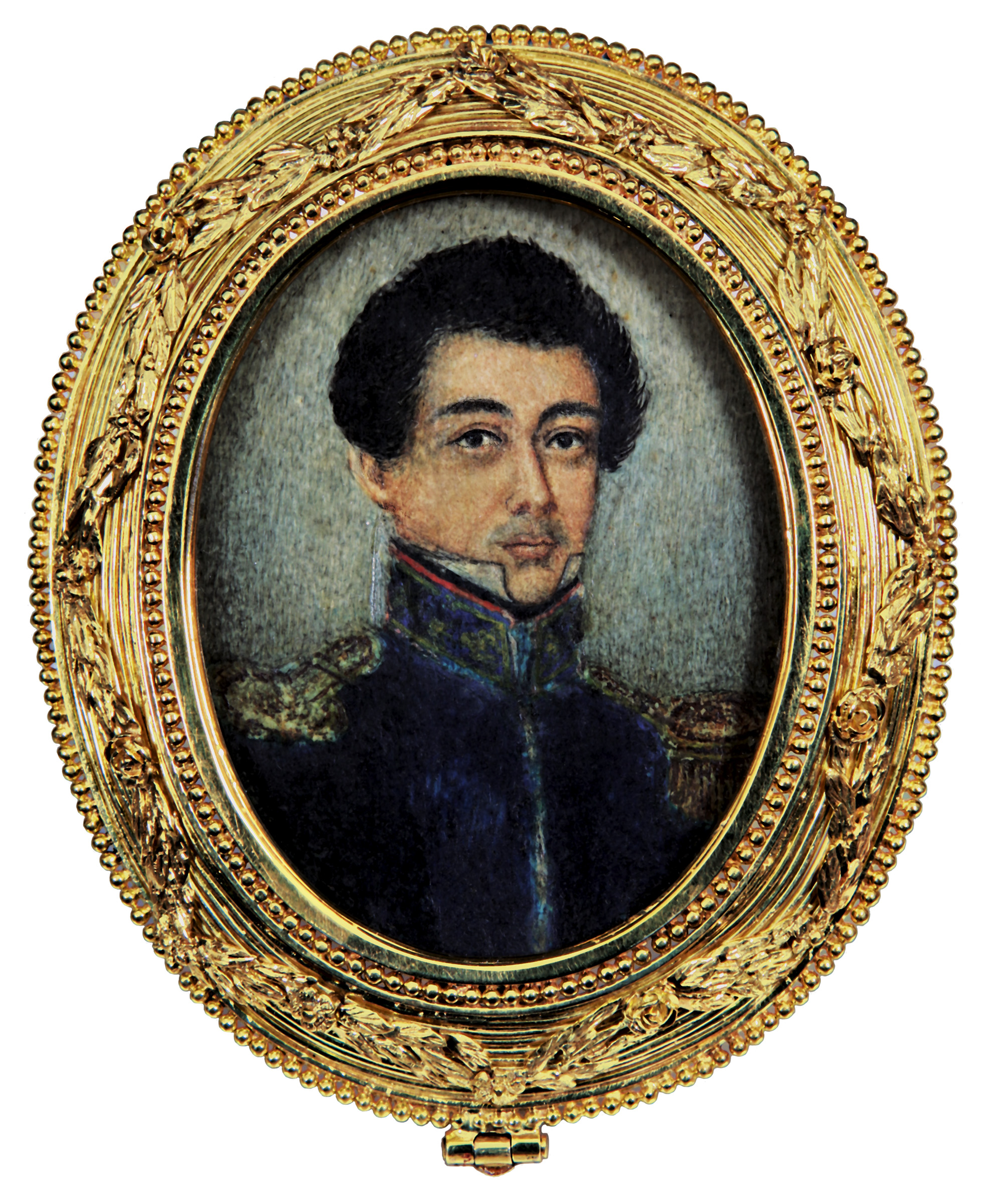
Self-Portrait, Undated, Paulino and Hetty Que Collection

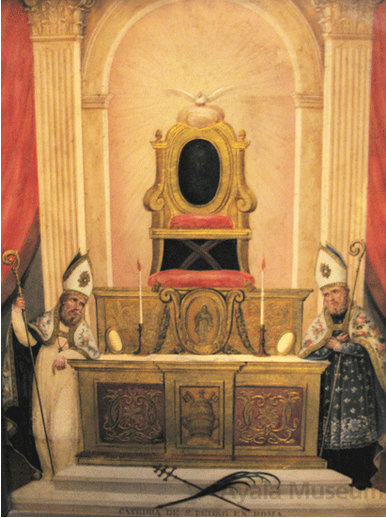
La Catedra de San Pedro en Roma, Undated, Heirs of Jaime V. Ongpin Collection

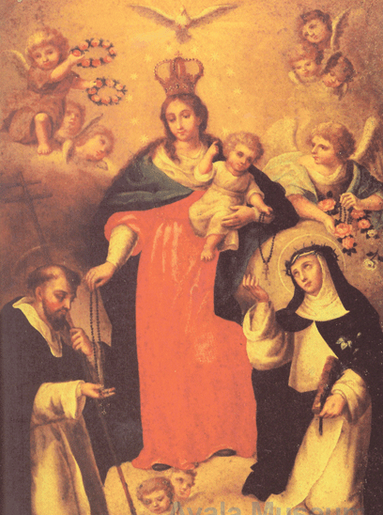
Nuestra Señora del Santisimo Rosario, Undated, Heirs of Jaime V. Ongpin Collection

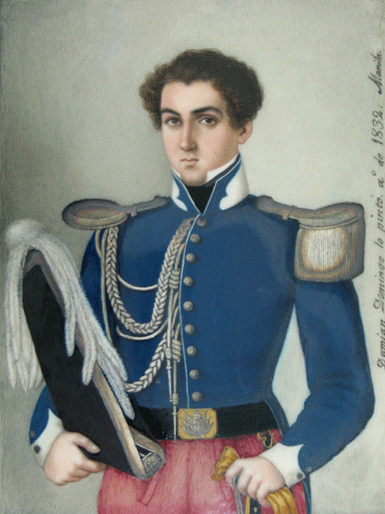
Portrait of Don Jose Maria Peñaranda, 1832, Del Monte Collection

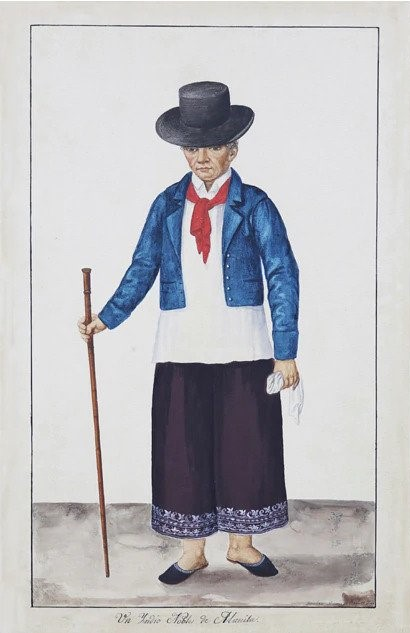
Un Indio Noble de Manila, Undated, Private Collection

== See also ==
- Tipos del Pais
- José Honorato Lozano
- Boxer Codex
- Juan Luna
- Códice Casanatense
- Fernando Amorsolo
- Fabián de la Rosa
- Justiniano Asuncion
- Félix Resurrección Hidalgo
- Isabelo Tampinco
- Bonifacio Arévalo
