= Letras y figuras =

Painting genre in Spanish Philippines

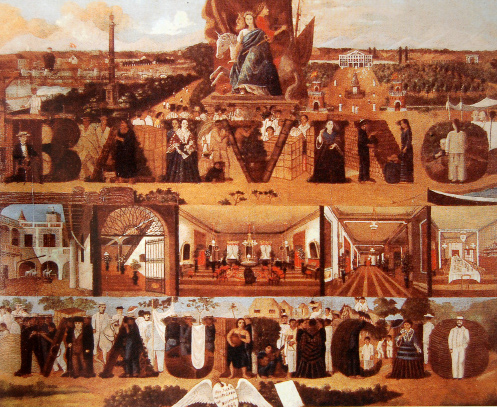
BALVINO MAURICIO, José Honorato Lozano, 1864

Letras y figuras (Spanish, "letters and figures") is a genre of painting pioneered by José Honorato Lozano during the Spanish colonial period in the Philippines. The art form is distinguished by the depiction of letters of the alphabet using a genre of painting that contoured shapes of human figures, animals, plants, and other objects called Tipos del País popularized by Damián Domingo. The letters depicted spell out a phrase or a name, usually that of the patron who commissioned the work. The paintings were done with watercolor on Manila paper. The earliest example of this art form dates from 1845; the latest existing specimens were completed during the latter portion of the American period in the 1930s during the administration of the Commonwealth of the Philippines.

In 1995, an album of José Honorato Lozano's paintings were auctioned at Christie’s at the starting bid of £300,000.

== Examples ==
- The BALVINO MAURICIO was completed by José Honorato Lozano in November 1864 for its namesake, Balvino Mauricio, a Binondo merchant who was later implicated in the 1872 Cavite mutiny. Measuring 93 cm x 113 cm, this painting depicts a Manila house of that time. This house is believed to be the same house described by José Rizal in the opening chapter of Noli Me Tángere.
- The IMELDA ROMUALDEZ MARCOS, of unknown provenance. Housed in the Malacañang Museum, it is believed to have been painted for former First Lady Imelda Marcos. It depicts buildings and institutions established by her and Ferdinand Marcos.
- PASKO (Filipino, "Christmas"), painted by Alvaro Jimenez in 1988 for the Ayala Museum. It was printed as the museum's Christmas card that same year.

== See also ==
- Art of the Philippines
- Historiated initial
