= Filipino Mestizos =

Racial identifier

Filipino mestizo
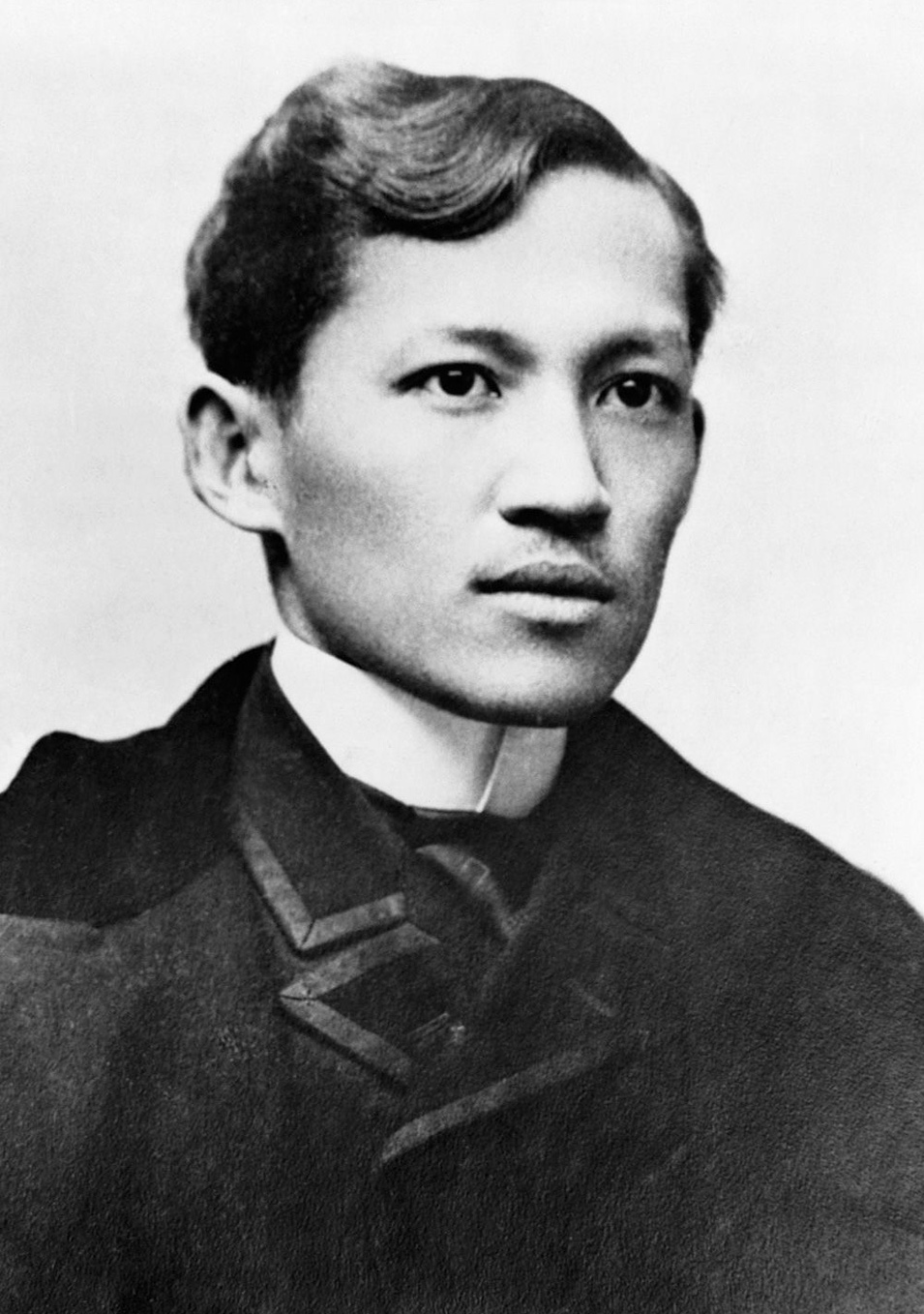
- The ancestry of Philippine National Hero, José Rizal, includes ethnic Tagalog, Hokkien Chinese, Spanish, and even Japanese, roots.

Regions with significant populations
- Philippines, United States, Canada, Spain

Languages
- Philippine languages, English, Spanish

Religion
- Predominantly Christianity (Roman Catholic majority, Protestant minority)

Related ethnic groups
- Chinese Filipinos, Spanish Filipinos, Americans in the Philippines, Japanese Filipinos, Indian Filipinos, Arab Filipinos

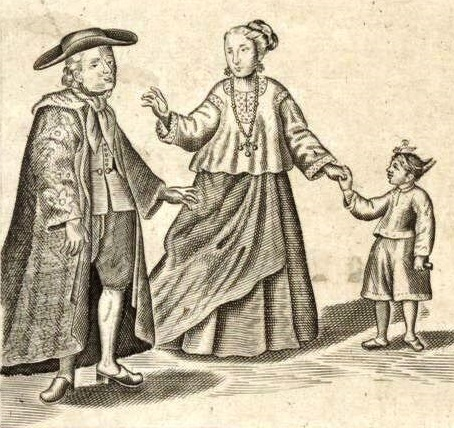
Mestizos as illustrated in the Carta Hydrographica y Chorographica de las Yslas Filipinas, 1734

In the Philippines, Filipino Mestizo (Spanish: mestizo (masculine) / mestiza (feminine); Filipino/Tagalog: Mestiso (masculine) / Mestisa (feminine)), or colloquially Tisoy, refers to people of mixed native Filipino and foreign ancestry. The word mestizo itself is of Spanish origin. It was first used in the Americas to describe people of mixed Amerindian and European ancestry. Currently and historically, the Chinese mestizos were and are the most populous subgroup among the Filipino mestizos; they have been historically influential in the creation of Filipino nationalism. Spanish mestizos also historically and currently exist as a smaller population, but remain a significant minority, among Filipino mestizos, who historically enjoyed social prestige during the time of Spanish colonialism.

== History ==
=== Spanish period ===
Spanish Filipino
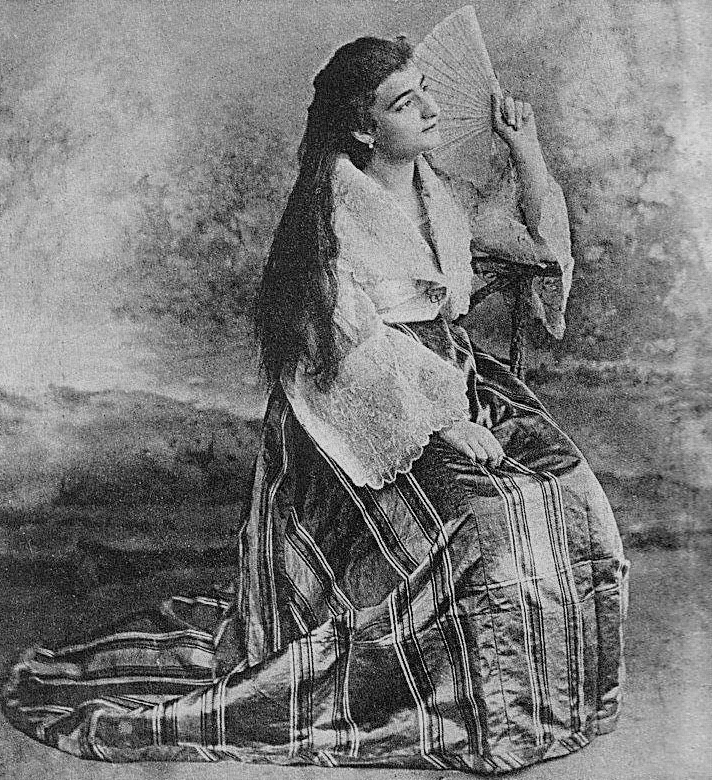
- Spanish-Filipina Mestiza wearing the traditional María Clara gown of the Philippines and the long hair tradition of the Filipina women during the colonial era

Regions with significant populations
- Philippines

Languages
- Filipino, other Philippine languages, English and Spanish.

Religion
- Christianity (Roman Catholicism, and Protestantism)

Related ethnic groups
- Filipino people, Filipino Mestizos

A Spanish expedition led by Miguel Lopez de Legazpi in 1565 started a period of Spanish colonization of the Philippines which lasted for 333 years. The Roman Catholic Church played an important role in the Spanish colonization of the Philippines beyond the preaching of the Catholic faith. Spanish missionaries contributed to education, healthcare, scientific research, and even public works. The Spanish government and religious missionaries studied the native Filipino languages and published the first grammars and dictionaries of Tagalog, the Bisayan languages, and others. In the earlier period, Roman Catholic rituals were adapted to native beliefs and values. As a result, a folk Roman Catholicism developed in the Philippines. European settlers from Spain and Mexico immigrated to the islands and their offspring (of either pure Spanish, or mixed Spanish and Native descent) adopted the culture of their parents and grandparents. Most Filipinos of Spanish descent in the Philippines are of Basque ancestry. Some families still privately use Spanish in the households. In addition, Chavacano (a creole language based largely on Spanish) is widely spoken in Zamboanga and neighboring regions, as well as in Cavite and Ternate. Spanish-era periodicals record that as many as one-third of the inhabitants of the island of Luzon possessed varying degrees of Spanish admixture. In addition to Manila, select cities such as Bacolod, Cebu, Iloilo or Zamboanga, which had important military fortifications and commercial ports during the Spanish era, also had sizable Mestizo communities.

=== Chinese immigration ===
Chinese Filipino
咱儂 / 咱人 / 華菲人 Chinito / Chinita / Intsik Pilipinong Tsino Lannang / Chinoy / Tsinoy
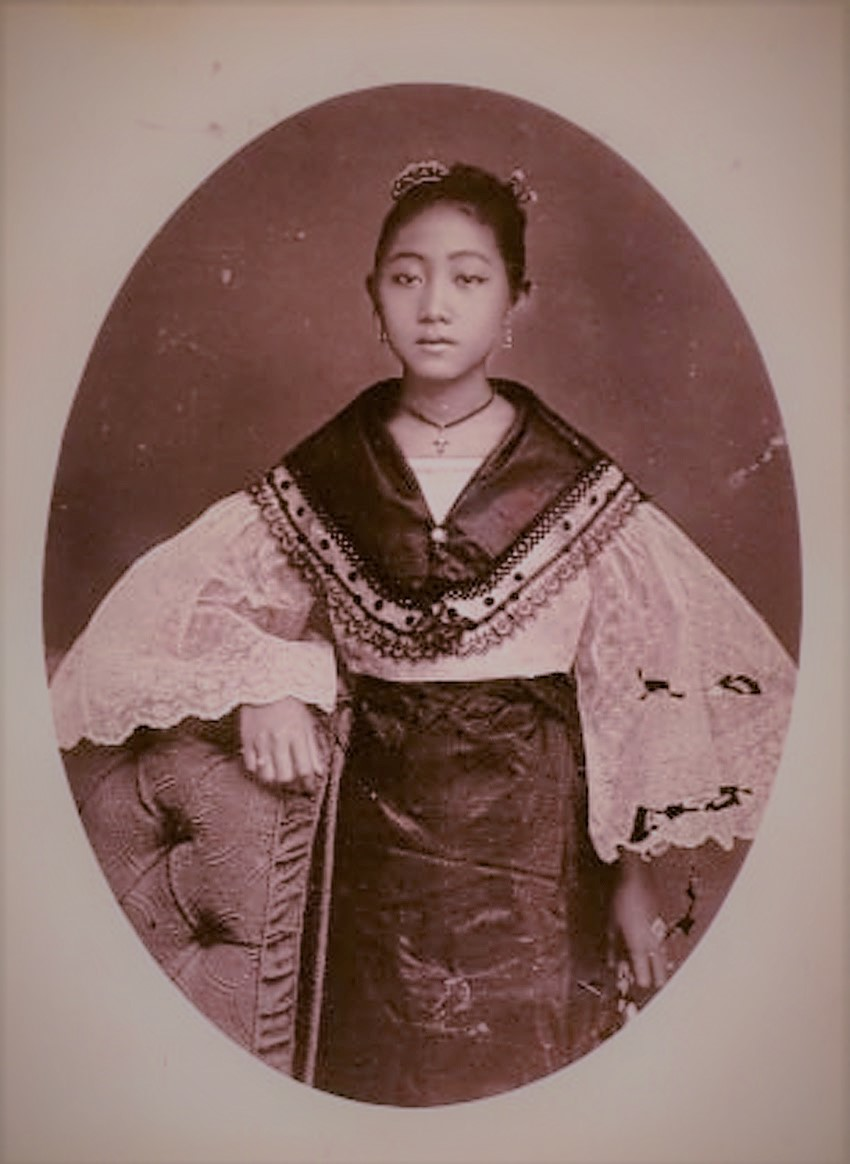
- Chinese-Filipina girl wearing the María Clara gown, the traditional gown of Filipina women

Total population
- At least 1.5 million are of pure Chinese ancestry.

Regions with significant populations
- Metro Manila, Baguio, Central Visayas, Metro Iloilo-Guimaras, Metro Davao; Negros, Pangasinan, Pampanga, Tarlac, Cagayan de Oro; Vigan, Laoag, Laguna, Rizal, Lucena, Naga, Zamboanga City, Sulu

Languages
- Filipino, English and other languages of the Philippines; Hokkien, Mandarin, Cantonese, Teochew, Hakka Chinese, various other varieties of Chinese

Religion
- Christianity (Roman Catholicism, Protestantism, P.I.C, Iglesia ni Cristo), Buddhism, Islam, Daoism

Related ethnic groups
- Sangley, Overseas Chinese

Even before the Spanish arrived in the Philippines, the Chinese had traded with the natives. During the colonial period, there was an increase in the number of Chinese immigrants to the Philippines. The Spaniards restricted the activities of the Chinese and confined them to the Parián, which was located near Intramuros, which they later could only live outside of if they became Christian, baptized by the Spanish friars. Most of the Chinese residents earned their livelihood as merchant traders.

Initially, many of the Chinese who arrived during the Spanish period were Hokkien initially from "Chiõ Chiu" (Zhangzhou) and some from "Chin Chiu", or "Chinchew", (Quanzhou), then later from Amoy (Xiamen), who were usually merchants. Rarely were they Macanese Cantonese or Taishanese from Macau and "Cantón" (Guangzhou or Guangdong province in general), who usually worked as cooks or laborers (cargadores coolies) or artisan craftsmen. By the American period, more "Fukien" came and continued the retail trade and currently make up most of the Chinese Filipino population with a few Cantonese also having come to build the Kennon Road / Benguet Road to Baguio. The Chinese residents of the islands were encouraged to intermarry with other native or Spanish Filipinos and convert to Roman Catholicism. Both native Filipinos and Chinese who lacked surnames were encouraged to adopt one from the Catálogo alfabético de apellidos, an alphabetical list of Spanish family names, introduced by the government in the mid-19th century.

During the United States colonial period, the Chinese Exclusion Act of the United States was also applied to the Philippines once it was under US administration. Despite this, many still found ways to migrate into the Philippines via legal exceptions, loopholes, or illegal means. There was a legal exception for "merchant's sons" with a Landing Certificate of Residence, and a loophole for family adoption through it. Some came illegally by stowing away on ships, sneaking past port authorities, or on their own boats landing where the coast guard was inadequate to stop it. Some later used these as a stepping stone to move to the mainland United States.

After the Second World War and the victory of the Communists in the Chinese Civil War, many refugees from mainland China settled in the Philippines. These groups formed the bulk of the current population of Chinese Filipinos in the 20th century. After the Philippines achieved full sovereignty on July 4, 1946, Chinese immigrants became naturalized Filipino citizens, while the children of these new citizens who were born in the country acquired Filipino citizenship from birth.

Chinese Filipinos are one of the largest overseas Chinese communities in Southeast Asia. Mestizos de Sangley—Filipinos with at least some Chinese ancestry descended from the Spanish colonial era—comprise 18–27% of the Philippine population. There used to be a record of roughly 1.5 million Filipinos with pure Chinese ancestry, or about 1.6% of the population at the time. The Philippine census currently is inconsistent in taking ethnicity into account.

== Ethnic groups in colonial Philippines ==
American settlement in the Philippines
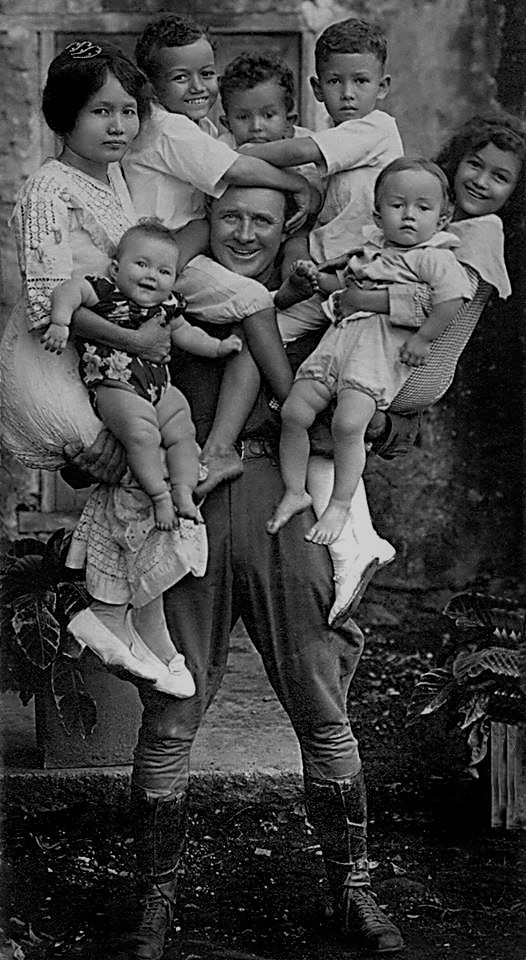
- Filipino-American family, Philippines

Regions with significant populations
- Angeles City · Baguio · San Fernando, La Union · Calamba · Tuguegarao · Calapan · Legazpi · Iloilo · Olongapo · Pagadian · Cagayan de Oro · Davao · Koronadal · Butuan · Cotabato · Metro Cebu · Metro Manila

Languages
- Filipino · American English · Philippine English

Religion
- Protestantism · Roman Catholicism · Buddhism

Japanese Filipino, Japanese people in the Philippines
日系 / 日系人 / 日系フィリピン人 にっけい / にっけいじん Hapon / Hapones / Haponesa Pilipinong Hapones Nikkei / Nikkeijin / Japino / Japinoy
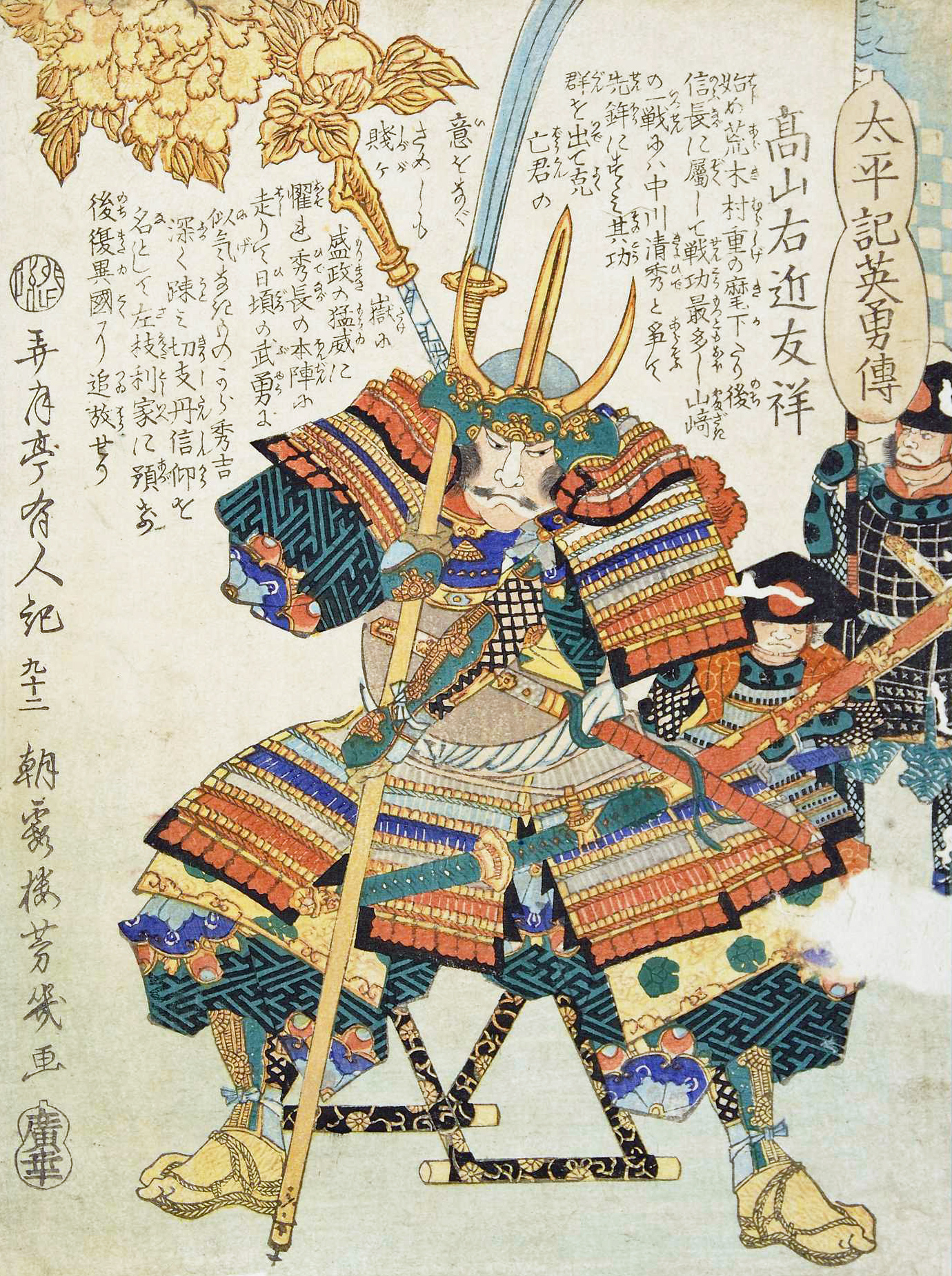
- Takayama Ukon was a Japanese Catholic daimyō who migrated to the Philippines together with 300 Kirishitan refugees in 1614 as one of the many waves of Japanese immigration to the Philippines during the Christian persecution throughout the 1600s in Japan under Tokugawa shogunate. Their descendants assimilated into the local populations, with no record of their number.

Total population
- Japanese nationals 16,894 (Oct. 2019); People of Japanese descent 200,000 (2006)

Regions with significant populations
- Metro Manila, Davao, the Visayas, Ilocos Norte, La Union

Languages
- Japanese, Filipino, other Philippine languages, English

Religion
- Christianity, Shinto, Buddhism.

Related ethnic groups
- Japanese people, foreign-born Japanese, Japanese diaspora

Except for the many waves of Chinese migration, the history of racial mixture in the Philippines occurred on a smaller scale than in other Spanish territories in the Americas during and after the Spanish colonial period from the 16th to the 19th century. This ethno-religious social stratification schema was similar to the casta system used in Hispanic America, with some major differences.

The system was used for taxation purposes, with indios and negritos who lived within the colony paying a base tax, mestizos de sangley paying double the base tax, sangleys paying quadruple; blancos, however, paid no tax. The tax system was abolished after the Philippine Declaration of Independence from Spain in 1898, and the term filipino was used to include the entire population of the Philippines regardless of ancestry, as per the Philippine nationality law. During the American colonial era, español filipino was still used to refer to Filipinos of Spanish descent "who have maintained the exercise of Spanish nationality or" were presumed to have done so.

The Spanish attempted to integrate the various races, using monetary incentives, and to place each race on an equal footing:

It is needful to encourage public instruction in all ways possible, permit newspapers subject to a liberal censure, to establish in Manila a college of medicine, surgery, and pharmacy: in order to break down the barriers that divide the races and amalgamate them all into one. For that purpose, the Spaniards of the country, the Chinese mestizos, and the (native) Filipinos shall be admitted with perfect equality as cadets of the military corps; the personal-service tax shall be abolished, or an equal and general tax shall be imposed, to which all the Spaniards shall be subject. This last plan appears to me more advisable, as the poll-tax is already established, and it is not opportune to make a trial of new taxes when it is a question of allowing the country to be governed by itself. Since the annual tribute is unequal, the average shall be taken and shall be fixed, consequently, at fifteen or sixteen reals per whole tribute, or perhaps one peso fuerte annually from each adult tributary person. This regulation will produce an increase in the revenue of 200,000 or 300,000 pesos fuertes, and this sum shall be set aside to give the impulse for the amalgamation of the races, favoring crossed marriages by means of dowries granted to the single women in the following manner.

To a Chinese mestizo woman who marries a (native) Filipino shall be given 100 pesos;

to a (native) Filipino woman who marries a Chinese mestizo, 100 pesos;

to a Chinese mestizo woman who marries a Spaniard, 1,000 pesos;

to a Spanish woman who marries a Chinese mestizo, 2,000 pesos;

to a (native) Filipino woman who marries a Spaniard, 2,000 pesos;

to a Spanish woman who marries a (native) Filipino chief, 3,000 or 4,000 pesos.

Some mestizo and (native) Filipino alcalde-mayor of the provinces shall be appointed. It shall be ordered that when a (native) Filipino chief goes to the house of a Spaniard, he shall seat himself as the latter's equal. In a word, by these and other means, the idea that they and the Castilians are two kinds of distinct races shall be erased from the minds of the natives, and the families shall become related by marriage in such manner that when free of the Castilian dominion should any exalted (native) Filipinos try to expel or enslave our race, they would find it so interlaced with their own that their plan would be practically impossible.'

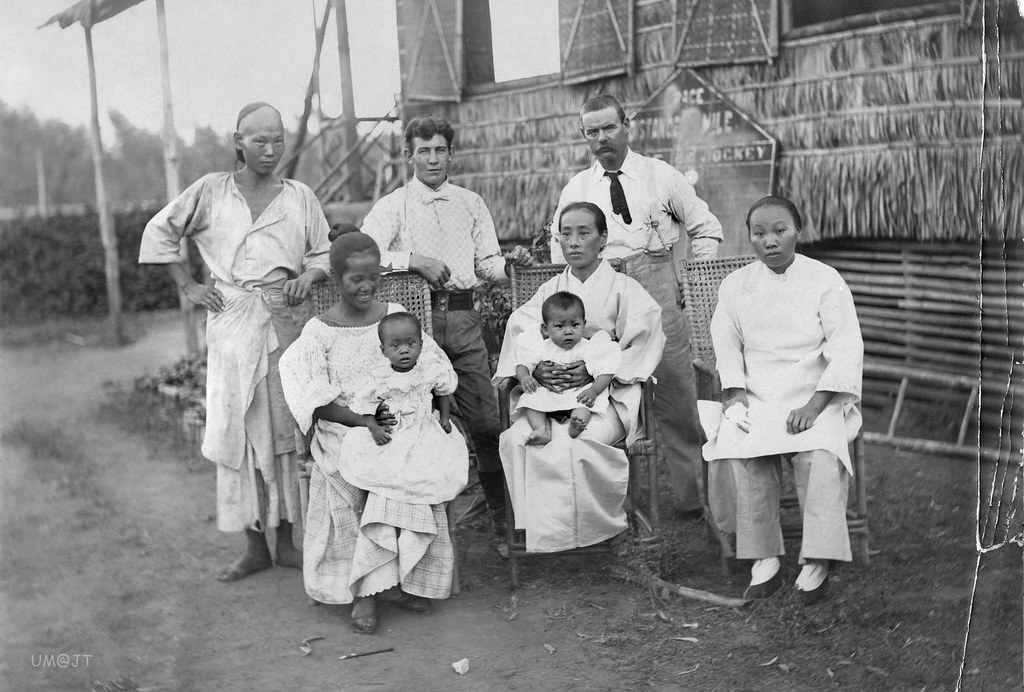
A Native Filipina with Caucasians (probably Europeans or Americans), Chinese, and Japanese settlers in the Philippines, c. 1900

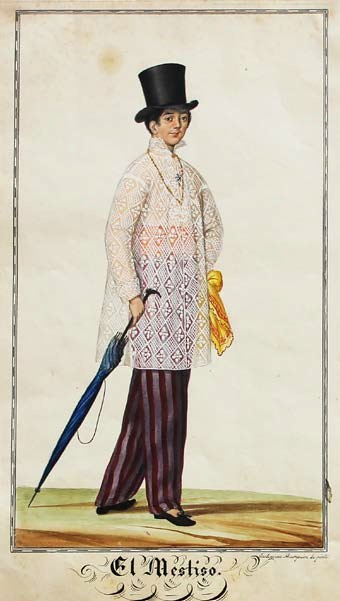
El Mestizo (A Filipino Mestizo) by Justiniano Asuncion, c. 1841

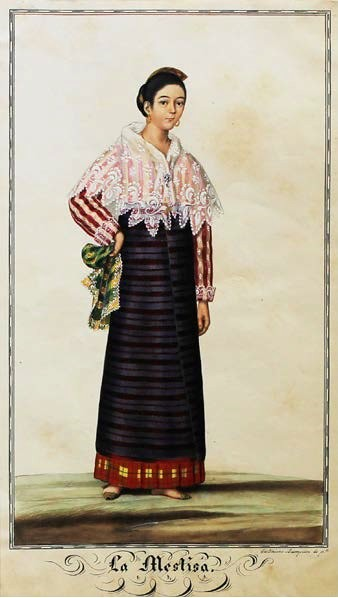
La Mestiza (A Filipina Mestiza) by Justiniano Asuncion, c. 1841

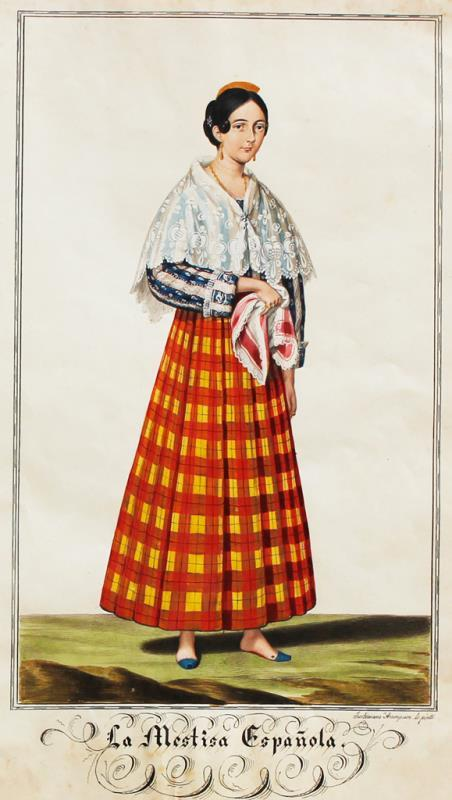
La Mestiza Española (A Spanish Philippine Mestiza) by Justiniano Asuncion, c. 1841

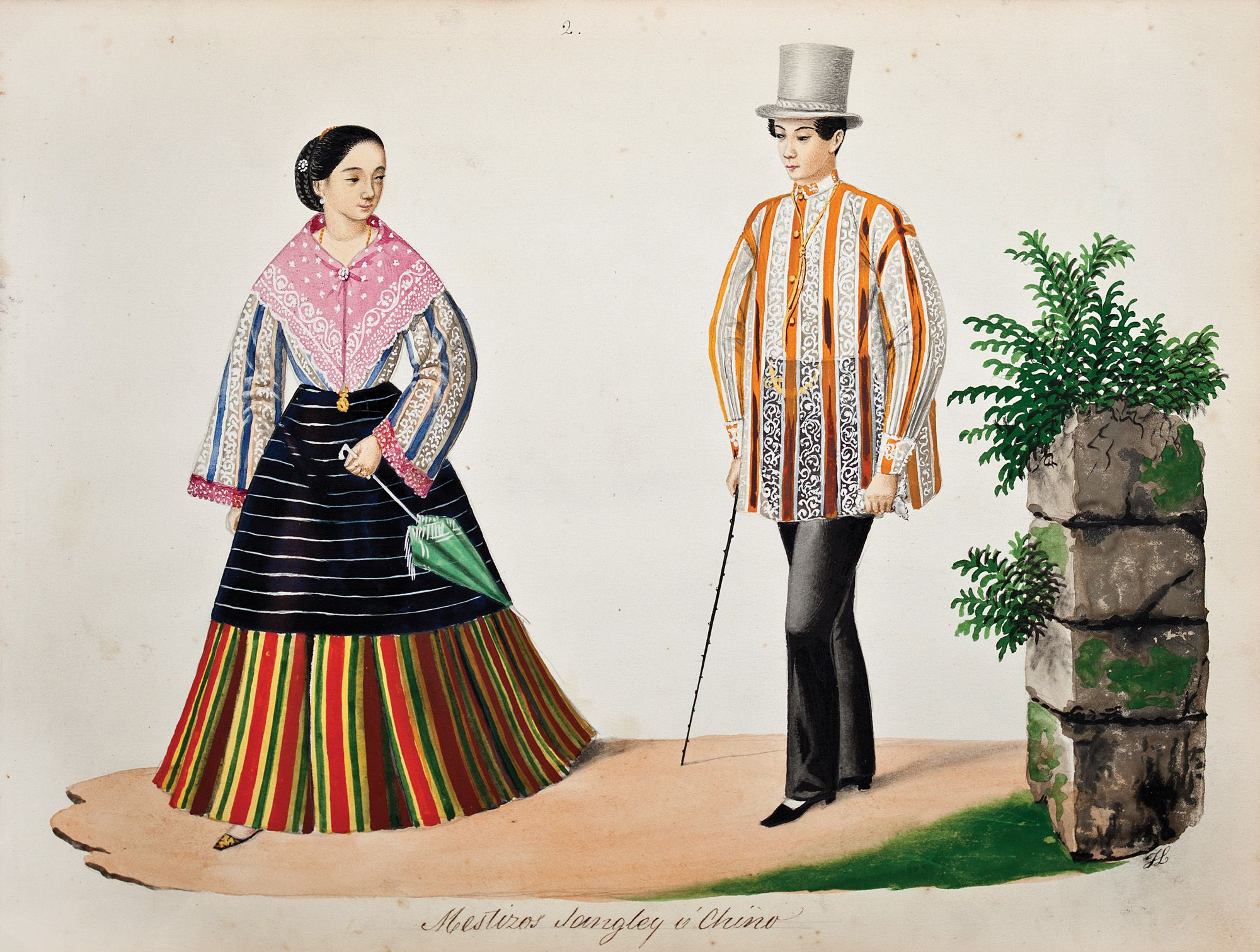
Mestizos Sangley y Chino (Sangley Chinese-Filipino Mestizos) by Justiniano Asuncion, c. 1841

Persons classified as blancos (whites) and those with Spanish ancestry were subdivided into the peninsulares (persons of pure Spanish descent born in Spain); insulares (persons of pure Spanish descent born in the Philippines, i.e. criollos); mestizos de español (persons of mixed Austronesian and Spanish ancestry), and tornatrás (persons of mixed Austronesian, Chinese, and Spanish ancestry).

Persons of pure or mostly Spanish descent living in the Philippines who were born in Hispanic America were classified as Americanos. Mestizos and mulattoses born in Hispanic America living in the Philippines kept their legal classification as such. Mulattos usually came as indentured servants to the Americanos. Philippine-born children of mestizos and mulattos from Hispanic America were classified based on patrilineal descent.

The indigenous peoples of the Philippines were referred to as Indios (those of pure Austronesian descent) and negritos. Indio was a general term applied to native Austronesians as a legal classification; it was only applied to Christianised natives who lived in proximity to the Spanish colonies. Persons who lived outside of Manila, Cebu, and areas with a large Spanish concentration were classified as: naturales, who were baptised Austronesians of the lowland and coastal towns; unbaptised Austronesians and Aetas who lived in the towns were classified as salvajes (savages) or infieles (infidels); remontados ("those who went to the mountains") and tulisanes (bandits) were Austronesians and Aetas who refused to live in towns and moved upland, and they were considered to live outside the social order as Catholicism was a driving force in everyday life as well as determinant of social class.

The Spanish legally classified the Aetas as negritos, based on their appearance. The term would be misinterpreted and used by future European scholars as an ethnoracial term in and of itself. Both Christianised Aetas who lived in the colony and unbaptised Aetas who lived in tribes outside of the colony were classified as negrito. Christianised Aetas who lived in Manila were not allowed to enter Intramuros and lived in areas designated for indios. Persons of Aeta descent were also viewed as being outside the social order, as they usually lived in tribes beyond settlements and resisted conversion to Christianity.

Term			Definition
españoles (Spaniards)	español peninsular / español europeo		Person of pure Spanish (or sometimes Portuguese) descent born and raised in Spain ("from the Iberian Peninsula").
españoles (Spaniards)	europeo naturalizado español		Person of non-Iberian, non-Iberoamerican European descent who has been granted naturalisation either in the metropole or in the colonies. Entitled to full rights as any other criollo unless given full rights by the Crown.
españoles (Spaniards)	criollo (White Creoles)	español americano	Person of pure or almost pure Spanish, Castizo (3/4 Spanish, 1/4 Amerindian) descent born and raised in Spanish America ("from the Americas").
españoles (Spaniards)	criollo (White Creoles)	español insular	Person of pure Spanish descent born and raised in the Spanish West or East Indies
españoles (Spaniards)	criollo (White Creoles)	español filipino	Person of mostly Spanish descent with less than a quarter non-Spanish blood ("from the Philippine Islands")
españoles (Spaniards)	mestizos (coloureds)	mestizo español	Person of mixed Spanish or Criollo/Americano and native Austronesian or Amerindian descent.
españoles (Spaniards)	mestizos (coloureds)	mestizo de sementera / tornatrás	Person of mixed Spanish and Chinese descent or mixed Spanish, Chinese, and native Austronesian descent. Term rarely used in the Spanish East Indies but its use was prevalent in Cavite. Not to be confused with torna atrás in the Americas.
españoles (Spaniards)	naturalizado español		Naturalised Spanish subjects of Chinese and sometimes Native or Arab descent. Occurrence was more common towards the final decades of Spanish rule. Usually a substantial financial and/or civic contribution, or even civil or military service merited naturalisation upon recommendation by the Captain-General to the Overseas Ministry or the Crown.
indio principal			Person of pure native Austronesian descent who was Christianised, usually under the Spanish missionaries of the Catholic Church.
indio natural			Person of pure native Austronesian descent who was Christianised, usually under the Spanish missionaries of the Catholic Church.
mestizo bombay			Person of mixed Indian and native Austronesian or Malay descent.
mulato			Person of mixed European and either Negro (African) or Negroid descent
indio infiel (unchristianised)			Person of usually pure indigenous pre-Austronesian descent, such as a member of the Aeta, Ati, Batak, Mamanwa, etc., or Austronesian descent
Negrito			Person of usually pure indigenous pre-Austronesian descent, such as a member of the Aeta, Ati, Batak, Mamanwa, etc., or Austronesian descent
mestizo sangley / chino			Person of mixed Chinese and native Austronesian descent or sometimes rarely of mixed Japanese ("xaponeses") descent lumped in. Was liable to pay the double tax.
chino / sangley cristiano			Person of pure Chinese descent who was Christianised, usually by the Spanish missionaries of the Catholic Church and remained Imperial Chinese subjects. Was liable to pay the quadruple tax.
sangley / chino infiel			Person of pure Chinese descent who was not Christianised and remained Imperial Chinese subjects. Was liable to pay the quadruple tax.
moro			Person who was Islamized, usually native Austronesian, Malay, Indian, Arab or Persian descent from the unconquered parts of Mindanao.

The fluid nature of racial integration in the Philippines during the Spanish colonial period was recorded by many travelers and public figures at the time, who were favorably impressed by the lack of racial discrimination, as compared to the situation in other European colonies.

Among them was Sir John Bowring, Governor General of British Hong Kong and a well-seasoned traveller who had written several books about the different cultures in Asia. He described the situation as "admirable" during a visit to the Philippines in the 1870s:

"The lines separating entire classes and races, appeared to me less marked than in the Oriental colonies. I have seen on the same table, Spaniards, Mestizos (Chinos cristianos) and Indios, priests and military. There is no doubt that having one Religion forms great bonding. And more so to the eyes of one that has been observing the repulsion and differences due to race in many parts of Asia. And from one (like myself) who knows that race is the great divider of society, the admirable contrast and exception to racial discrimination so markedly presented by the people of the Philippines is indeed admirable."

Another foreign witness was English engineer Frederic H. Sawyer, who had spent most of his life in different parts of Asia and lived in Luzon for fourteen years. His impression was that as far as racial integration and harmony was concerned, the situation in the Philippines was not equaled by any other colonial power:

"... Spaniards and natives lived together in great harmony, and do not know where I could find a colony in which Europeans mixes as much socially with the natives. Not in Java, where a native of position must dismount to salute the humblest Dutchman. Not in British India, where the Englishwoman has now made the gulf between British and native into a bottomless pit."

== Statistics ==
Though the Philippines upholds the principle of racial equality and does not actively gather information on specific races, statistics from historical immigration records, census results, and ship passenger logs can be used to ascertain the populations of specific types of Filipino mestizos.

=== Immigration logs of Mexican Filipinos ===
Stephanie J. Mawson, by going through records in the archives of Mexico, discovered that Spaniards were not the only immigrant group in the Philippines; Peru and Mexico also sent soldiers to the islands, and in fact outnumbered the Spaniards who immigrated to the Philippines.

Geographic distribution and year of settlement of the Latin-American immigrant soldiers assigned to the Philippines in the 1600s.
Location	1603	1636	1642	1644	1654	1655	1670	1672
Manila	900	446	—	407	821	799	708	667
Fort Santiago	—	22	—	—	50	—	86	81
Cavite	—	70	—	—	89	—	225	211
Cagayan	46	80	—	—	—	—	155	155
Calamianes	—	—	—	—	—	—	73	73
Caraga	—	45	—	—	—	—	81	81
Cebu	86	50	—	—	—	—	135	135
Formosa	—	180	—	—	—	—	—	—
Moluccas	80	480	507	—	389	—	—	—
Otón	66	50	—	—	—	—	169	169
Zamboanga	—	210	—	—	184	—	—	—
Other	255	—	—	—	—	—	—	—
	—	—	—	—	—	—	—	—
Total Reinforcements	1,533	1,633	2,067	2,085	n/a	n/a	1,632	1,572

The book Intercolonial Intimacies Relinking Latin/o America to the Philippines, 1898–1964 By Paula C. Park, citing Forzados y reclutas: los criollos novohispanos en Asia (1756-1808), gave a higher number of later Mexican soldier-immigrants to the Philippines, pegging the number at 35,000 immigrants in the 1700s, in a Philippine population that was only around 1.5 million, thus consisting of 2.33% of the population.

=== Tribute counts of Spanish Filipinos ===
In the late 1700s to early 1800s, Joaquín Martínez de Zúñiga, an Augustinian friar from Spain, in his two-volume book: Estadismo de las islas Filipinas compiled a census of the Spanish-Philippines based on the tribute counts (which represented an average family of seven to ten children and two parents, per tribute) and came up with the following statistics:

Data Reported for the 1800 as Divided by Ethnicity and Province
Province	Native Tributes	Spanish Mestizo Tributes	All Tributes (Note: Including others such as Latin-Americans and Chinese-Mestizos, pure Chinese paid tribute but were not Philippine citizens as they were transients who returned to China, and Spaniards were exempt)
Tondo	14,437-1/2	3,528	27,897-7
Cavite	5,724-1/2	859	9,132-4
Laguna	14,392-1/2	336	19,448-6
Batangas	15,014	451	21,579-7
Mindoro	3,165	3-1/2	4,000-8
Bulacan	16,586-1/2	2,007	25,760-5
Pampanga	16,604-1/2	2,641	27,358-1
Bataan	3,082	619	5,433
Zambales	1,136	73	4,389
Ilocos	44,852-1/2	631	68,856
Pangasinan	19,836	719-1/2	25,366
Cagayan	9,888	0	11,244-6
Camarines	19,686-1/2	154-1/2	24,994
Albay	12,339	146	16,093
Tayabas	7,396	12	9,228
Cebu	28,112-1/2	625	28,863
Samar	3,042	103	4,060
Leyte	7,678	37-1/2	10,011
Caraga	3,497	0	4,977
Misamis	1,278	0	1,674
Negros Island	5,741	0	7,176
Iloilo	29,723	166	37,760
Capiz	11,459	89	14,867
Antique	9,228	0	11,620
Calamianes	2,289	0	3,161
TOTAL	299,049	13,201	424,992-16

The Spanish Mestizo population as a proportion of each provincial population varied widely: 19% of the population of Tondo province (the most populous province and former name of Manila), to Pampanga 13.7%, Cavite at 13%, Laguna 2.28%, Batangas 3%, Bulacan 10.79%, Bataan 16.72%, Ilocos 1.38%, Pangasinan 3.49%, Albay 1.16%, Cebu 2.17%, Samar 3.27%, Iloilo 1%, Capiz 1%, Bicol 20%, and Zamboanga 40%. According to the data, in the Archdiocese of Manila, which includes much of Luzon, about 10% of the population was Spanish-Filipino. Spanish-Filipinos maintaining a minimum median of 5% of the total Philippine population, across all provinces.

The previously cited census record, summing the tributes from the late 1700s, is also corroborated by another census finished in 1818, also headed by clergy, this time by the two priest-scientists Fr. Manuel Buzeta and Fr. Felipe Bravo. They concluded that there were 1,522,221 souls represented by 312,251 tributes, or families, in the islands: with 400 tributes representing that number of pure Spanish families, 8,584 Spanish-mestizo tributes representing the Spanish-mestizo families, and 9,901 Chinese-mestizo tributes representing that number of Chinese-mestizo families. Calculating for the family size of a tribute, which is 1 tribute for 9 persons in a family—1:9" (1 Father and 8 Children as per the average number of children in the census, and disregarding the race of the mother, which legally becomes that of the husband upon marriage), 8,584 Spanish-mestizo tributes plus 400 pure Spanish tributes add up to 8,984 Spanish-blooded tributes, which when multiplied by 9 results in 71,872 Spanish-blooded citizens, which is about 4.72% of the 1,522,221 living in the Spanish-Philippines, similar to the 5% ratio stated in the earlier census by Joaquín Martínez de Zúñiga.

As outlined below are the primary statistics of the said census:

Felipe Bravo Census Demographics (Albay, 1818)
Provinces	Pueblos	Native Families	Spanish Filipino Families	Negrito Families	Chinese Filipino Families
Albay	Albay, Cabicera	5,515		2	2
	Manito	240	4		
	Bacon	2,119	45		
	Cuba	2,162	52		
	Casiguran	1,025	28		
	Juban	396	18		
	Sorsogon	1,783	149		
	Bulusan	1,777	19		
	Bulan	714	16		
	Donsol	241			
	Quipia	269			
	Lilog	821	33	23	
	Bacacay	1,295	77		
	Malilipot	981	53		
	Tabaco	3,347	225		
	Malitao	2,844	241		
	Tibi	2,069	157	110	
	Lagonoy y su anejo	1,669	18	521	
	San Jose	1,829	114	470	
	Caramoan	641		72	
Total		31,737	1,249	1,198	2

Felipe Bravo Census Demographics (Isla De Ticao, 1818)
Provinces	Pueblos	Native Families	Spanish Filipino Families	Negrito Families	Chinese Filipino Families
Isla de Ticao	San Jacinto	266	8		
Total		266	8		

Felipe Bravo Census Demographics (Isla De Masbate, 1818)
Provinces	Pueblos	Native Families	Spanish Filipino Families	Negrito Families	Chinese Filipino Families
Isla de Masbate	Mobo	912	1		
Total		912	1		

Felipe Bravo Census Demographics (Isla De Catanduanes, 1818)
Provinces	Pueblos	Native Families	Spanish Filipino Families	Negrito Families	Chinese Filipino Families
Isla De Catanduanes	Virac	1,581	91		
	Calolbon	847	3		
	Eiga	847	3		
	Payo y sus anejos Bagamanoc y Ooc	644	17		
	Pandan y Caramoan	489	2		
Total		4,408	116		

Felipe Bravo Census Demographics (Antique, 1818)
Provinces	Pueblos	Native Families	Spanish Filipino Families	Chinese Filipino Families
Antique	San José de Buenavista, cabecera	5,925	6	
	San Pedro de Balbalan	2,247		
	Sibalom	4,665	2	
	Patnongon y su visita Coritan	2,097	3	
	Bugason	3,060	1	
	San Antonio de Nalupa, su anejo Culari y visitas Tibiao, Bitad, Tun, Bacafan y Batunan	2,542	19	
	Pandan	300		
	Antique	2,304	12	
	Dao	1,296	7	
	Cagayan Chico en la isla del mismo nombre	527		
Total	(Across the Province)	24,963	50	40

Felipe Bravo Census Demographics (Bataan, 1818)
Provinces	Pueblos	Native Families	Spanish Filipino Families	Moreno Filipino Families	Negro (Black) Filipino Families	Chinese Filipino Families
Bataan	Balanga, cabecera	1,608	12		18	8
	Abucay	1,406	20		3	5
	Samar	1,000	4		1	
	Orani	1,000	25			8
	Llana-Hermosa	716	1			
	San Juan de Dinalupijan	451	19		7	3
	Pilar	899				
	Mariveles y su visita Morong	1,522	3	1	5	
	Orion ú Odiong	1,550	8	2	18	3
Total		10,152	92	3	52	27

Felipe Bravo Census Demographics (Batangas, 1818)
Provinces	Pueblos	Native Families	Spanish Filipino Families	Chinese Filipino Families
Batangas	Balayan, cabecera.	4,521	22	
	Lian.	629	7	
	Nasugbů.	866		2
	Rosario	1,758	4	
	Santo Tomas.	1,256		
	San Pablo de los Montes	1,948	7	
	Taal	8,312		
	Baoan ó Banang	5,813		
	Batangas	6,889		
	San José	2,427		
	Tanauan.	2,106		
	Lipa	4,104		
Total		40,629	40	2

Felipe Bravo Census Demographics (Bulacan, 1818)
Provinces	Pueblos	Native Families	Spanish Filipino Families	Converted Negro Families	Chinese Filipino Families
Bulacan	Bulacan, cabecera.	5,200			
	Bigáa.	1,876			
	Guiguinto.	1,291			
	Malolos.	8,110			
	Paombon.	1,058			
	Hagonoy.	4,572			
	Calumpít.	2,628			
	Quingua.	2,912			
	San Isidro.	2,560			
	Baliuag.	4,296			
	San Rafael.	1,650	10		
	Angat.	5,441			
	San José.	219			
	Santa María de Pandi.	1,588	17		
	Bocaue.	2,550	88		2
	Marilao.	881	28	5	1
	Meycauayan.	2,375	46		
	Polo.	3,160	44		4
	Obando.	2,493			
Total		54,360	233	5	7

Felipe Bravo Census Demographics (Cagayan, 1818)
Province	Pueblo	Native Families	Spanish Filipino Families
Cagayan	Lal-lo, cabecera.	975	313
	Camalaniugan.	1,156	
	Piat y su visita.	899	
	Tabang..	201	
	Cabagan.	3,543	
	Malaveg con su visita Mabanaug.	524	
	Tuao..	1,393	
	Iguig y su visita Amulong.	403	
	Tuguegarao.	5,072	
	Aparri..	1,715	
	Abulug.	1,162	1
	San Juan y su visita Masi.	913	
	Nasiping y su visita Gataran.	573	
	Ilagan..	1,150	
	Gamú y su visita Furao.	586	16
	Tumauini.	827	
	Bugay..	299	
	Aritao..	580	
	Dupax.	867	6
	Bambang..	893	
	Bayombong.	771	
	Lumabang.	332	
	Bagabag y su Fuerza.	508	
	Carig y su Fortaleza el Sto. Niño.	305	
	Camarag.	488	
	Angadanan.	320	
	Cauayan.	318	
	Calaniugan.	135	
TOTAL		26,726	336

Felipe Bravo Census Demographics (Calamianes, 1818)
Province	Pueblo	Native Families	Spanish Filipino Families
Islas de Calamianes
Calamianes	Culion en la de Calamianes, Isla de Linacapan, e Isla de Coron.	1,044	2
Isla de Paragua
	Taytay, Silanga, Meitejet, Pancol, Guinlo, y Barbacan.	1,424	4
Islas de Dumaran y Agutay
	Isla y pueblo de Dumaran e Isla y pueblo de Agutay.	632	
Islas de Cuyo
	Isla y pueblo de Cuyo y su anejo, Canipo, e Isla de Pagaguayan.	2,430	25
TOTAL		5,530	31

Felipe Bravo Census Demographics (Camarines, 1818)
Province	Pueblo	Native Families	Spanish Filipino Families	Lacandula Families	Negro Filipinos	Chinese Filipinos
Partido de Vicol (Ciudad de Nueva-Caceres)
Camarines	Tabaco y Santa Cruz.	3,593	301		4	3
	Naga.	956				
	Camaligan.	1,388				
	Canaman.	1,589				
	Magarao ó Mangarao.	1,862				
	Bombom ó Bonbon.	1,245				
	Quipayo.	784				
	Calabanga.	1,174				
	Libmanan ó Libnanan.	1,490	1			
	Milaor.	1,902	7			
	San Fernando.	688	2			
	Minalabag.	901				
Partido de la Rinconada
	Bula.	471				
	Bao ó Baao.	1,538	37		4	
	Nabua.	2,612	2		2	
	Iriga.	2,040	1			
	Buhi ó Buji.	1,979	10			
	Bato.	495				
Partido de la Iriga
	Libon.	410	4			
	Polangui.	2,903	15			
	Ors ú Oas.	3,614				
	Ligao.	2,968	24			
	Guinobatan.	2,605	1			
	Camalig.	2,330	39		9	
	Cagsava.	2,870				
Monte Isaroc
	Pueblo y Mision de Manguirin.	160			629	
	Goa, Tigabon y Tinambag.	1,123		2	625	
Partido de la Contra-Costa
	Sipocot, Lupi y Ragay.	406				
	Daet.	1,449	26		10	
	Talisay.	1,055	2			
	Indan.	675	6			
	Paracale.	697	34			
	Mambulao.	950				
	Capalonga.	137			4	
TOTAL		50,762	512	2	1,287	3

Felipe Bravo Census Demographics (Capiz, 1818)
Province	Pueblo	Native Families	Spanish Filipino Families	Lacandula Families	Negro Filipino families	Chinese Filipino families
Capiz	Capiz y su visita Ibisan.	2,650				
	Panay.	2,275				
	Panitan.	1,485				
	Dumalag y sus visitas Dao y Tapas.	3,158				
	Dumarao.	2,600				
	Mambusao y sus visitas Sigma y Jamindan.	1,924	13			
	Batan y su visita Sapiang.	2,255	56			
	Banga y su visita Madalag.	1,579	8			
	Malinao.	1,487	11			
	Calibo y su visita Macao.	2,700	167			
	Ibajay.	1,268	30			
Isla de Romblon
	Romblon.	1,514	15			
Isla de Sibuyan
	Cauit, Pagalar, y Cajidiocan.	1,114				
Isla de Banton
	Banton.					
Isla de Tablas
	Guintinguian, Aghagacay, Odiongan, Lanan, y Loog.					
Isla de Simara
	San José, Coloncolon.					
Isla del Maestre de Campo
	Sibali.					
TOTAL		26,009	285			

Felipe Bravo Census Demographics (Caraga, 1818)
Province	Pueblo	Native Families	Spanish Filipino Families	Lacandula Families	Negro Filipino families	Chinese Filipino families
Distrito de Surigao y Siargao
Caraga	Surigao (cabecera), Tagauan, Gigaquit ó Higaguit, Cabubungan, Isla y pueblo de Dinagat, Caco en la isla de Siargao, Dapa en dicha isla, Cabuntug en la misma isla, Sapao en la citada isla.	2,475	25			
Distrito de Butuan y Talacogon
	Butuan, Habungan, Tabay, Maynio, Talacogon.	1,593	10			
Distrito de Cantilan y Mision de San Juan
	Lutao, Hingoog, Cantilan, Tago, Tandac, Lianga y la Mision de San Juan.	1,155				
Distrito de Bislic y Mision de Caraga
	Jinatuan, Bislic, Catel, Bagangan y la Mision de Caraga.	955				
TOTAL		6,178	35			

Felipe Bravo Census Demographics (Cavite, 1818)
Province	Pueblo	Native Families	Spanish Filipino Families	Lacandula Families	Negro Filipino families	Morenos	Chinese Filipino families
Cavite	Plaza y puerto de Cavite.	221	153			5	100
	San Roque.	3,906	443			3	35
	Cavite viejo.	1,855	55				4
	Bacood ó Bacor.	1,729	19				4
	San Francisco de Malabon.	1,510	69				3
	Santa Cruz de Malabon.	2,090	3			1	2
	Pueblo y Hacienda de Nait.	942	3			4	2
	Marigondon.	2,043					3
	Indan.	2,759	36				2
	Silang.	2,255	6			1	4
	Imus.	2,015	125				5
TOTAL		21,325	912			14	164

Felipe Bravo Census Demographics (Cebu, 1818)
Province	Pueblo	Native Families	Spanish Filipino Families	Lacandula Families	Negro Filipino families	Chinese Filipino families
Isla de Cebu
Cebu	Cabecera, El Sto. Nombre de Jesus.	868	255			
	Parian, Yutaos y Sogod con la visita de este, Simugui.	1,795	109			
	San Nicolás y sus visits Talisay, Lipata, Tansan, y Pitao.	2,420				
	Opon y Talamban.	2,850				
	Mandave ó Mandaui.	2,729	20			
	Danao y Catmon.	2,656	57			
	Barili y sus visitas Duman, Jod, Malhual, Coston, Badian y Taiuran.	1,943	14			
	Samboan y sus visitas Jiratilan, Malabuyot, y Taburan.	2,496	69			
	Bolojon y sus visitas Tayon, Calob, Mambuji y Yunan.	2,420				
	Dalaguete.	2,556				
	Argao y Carcar.	3,250				
Isla de Bantayan
	Bantayan y sus visitas Octon y Davis, Daan, Bantayan y sus visits Sogod y Cavit.	2,169	75			
Isla de Siquijor
	Siquijor y su visita Canoan.	2,450	46			
Isla de Bohol
	Inabangan y sus visitas Pampan, Corte, Taoran, Canogon, Tubigon, Ipil, Talibon, Tabigui, Inbay, y Cabulao.	1,815	41			
	Gindulman y sus visitas Quimale y Cugton.	1,500	6			
	Jagna.	3,255				
	Dimiao.	2,016				
	Loay.	1,614	5			
	Lobog y su anejo S. Isidro.	3,852				
	Baclayon.	3,549	5			
	Tagbilaran.	2,370	2			
	Pimin-vitan.	1,414				
	Malabohoo.	2,269				
	Loon y su visita Catarbacan.	1,990				
	Calape y sus visitas Bintig y Mondoog.	1,932				
Isla de Davis
	Davis.	2,055	9			
	Panglao.	1,350				
Isla de Camotes
	Poro y sus visitas (administración de Mandave).					
TOTAL		60,305	638			

Felipe Bravo Census Demographics (Ilocos Norte, 1818)
Province	Pueblo	Native Families	Spanish Filipino Families	Lacandula Families	Negro Filipino families	Chinese Filipino families
Ilocos Norte	Bangui.	1,449	5			
	Nagpartian.	423				
	Pasuquin.	1,530				
	Bacarra.	4,901				
	Vintar.	2,064				
	Sarrat ó San Miguel de Cuning.	2,755				
	Pigdig y su visita Santiago.	4,015				
	Dingras.	4,559				
	Laoag.	12,055				
	San Nicolás.	3,498				
	Batac.	7,026				
	Paoay.	7,447				
	Badoc.	3,356				
TOTAL		55,078	5			

Felipe Bravo Census Demographics (Ilocos Sur, 1818)
Province	Pueblo	Native Families	Spanish Filipino Families	Lacandula Families	Negro Filipino families	Chinese Filipino families
Ilocos Sur	Sinait.	2,625				
	Cabugao.	3,595				
	Lapoc.	1,791				
	Masingal.	2,740				
	Bantay y su visita San Ildefonso.	5,535				
	Santo Domingo.	2,912	36			
	San Vicente Ferrer.	2,113	10			
	Santa Catalina.	4,292				
	Vigan.	6,849	421			14
	Santa Catalina V. y M.	1,750				
	Narvacan.	4,185				
	Santa Maria.	2,985				
	San Esteban.	819				
	Santiago.	1,023				
	Candong.	5,709				
	Santa Lucia y su visita Santa Cruz con la mision de Ronda.	3,690				
	Tagudin y Ous.	2,620				
	Mision llamada Sevilla.					
	Mision de Argaguinan.					
	Bangas y sus misiones.	2,582				
	Villa-Cruz y San Rafael.					
	Namacpacan.	2,564				
	Balaoan.	2,703				
Distrito del Abra
	Tayum en el Abra.	1,307	4			
	Bangued en idem.	1,836	9			
TOTAL		61,397	530			14

Felipe Bravo Census Demographics (Iloilo, 1818)
Province	Pueblo	Native Families	Spanish Filipino Families	Lacandula Families	Negro Filipino families	Chinese Filipino families
Iloilo	Iloilo (cabecera) y Guimaras.	1,594	103			
	Molo.	3,457	23			
	Mandurrio.	5,966				
	Barotac, Asuy y Batag.	1,200				
	Ooton.	5,395				
	Tigbauan.	3,248				
	Guimbal y Tabungan.	4,209				
	Miagao.	4,096				
	San Joaquin.	1,180				
	Igbaras.	3,329				
	Camando.	1,974				
	Alimodian y San Miguel.	4,230				
	Ma-asin.	2,880				
	Cabatuan.	6,470				
	Xaro.	6,871				
	Santa Bárbara.	3,600				
	Janiuay.	4,158				
	Lambuso.	1,040				
	Calinog.	960				
	Pasi y Abaca.	2,637				
	Laglag y Diale.	2,252				
	Pototan.	3,000				
	Dumangas, Anilao, Banate y Barotac.	3,200				
TOTALS		77,862	126			

Felipe Bravo Census Demographics (Laguna, 1818)
Province	Pueblo	Native Families	Spanish Filipino Families	Lacandula Families	Negro Filipino families	Morenos	Chinese Filipino families
Laguna	Pagsanjan, cabecera.	4,785	7				
	Lumban.	1,983					
	Paete.	1,088					
	Longos con su anejo San Antonio del Monte.	944					
	Paquil.	628					
	Panguil.	1,030					
	Siniloan.	1,911					
	Mavitac.	525					
	Santa Maria Caboan.	257					
	Cavioli.	854					
	Majayjay.	4,948					
	Lilio.	2,168					
	Nagcarlan.	2,557					
	Santa Cruz.	2,528					
	Bay.	668					
	Pueblo y hacienda de Calauang.	610	2				
	Pila.	1,117	3				
	Los Baños.	460					5
	Calamba.	959	4				15
	Cabuyao.	1,755			1		14
	Santa Rosa.	1,760					9
	Biñan.	2,598	8		2	2	
	San Pedro Tunasau.	1,112	2			1	
	Pililla.	1,096					
	Tanay.	1,352					
	Binangonan de Bay.	1,234					
	Moron.	1,747					
	Baras.	486	3				
	Pueblo y hacienda de Angono.	513	2		2	3	
TOTAL		40,239	34		5	6	41

Felipe Bravo Census Demographics (Leyte, 1818)
Province	Pueblo	Native Families	Spanish Filipino Families	Lacandula Families	Negro Filipino families	Chinese Filipino families
Leyte	Taclovan (cabecera) y Palo.	2,290	11			
	Tanauan.	2,155	29			
	Dulag y Abuyog.	2,229	14			
	Barayuen, Haro y Alang-alang.	864				
	Barugo y San Miguel.	626				
	Carigara y su visita Leyte.	2,253				
	Palompon, Ogmug y Baybay.	826				
	Hilongos, Bato, Matalom, y Cajanguaan.	1,231	2			
	Indan, Dagami, e Isla de Panamao.	1,978				
Islas de Biliran y Maripipi
	Biliran, Isla de Maripipi, y Maripipi.	538				
Isla de Panahon y Costa Sur
	Isla de Panahon, Ma-asin, Sogod, Cabalian, y Liloan.	1,450				
TOTALES		16,244	56			

Felipe Bravo Census Demographics (Mariana Islands, 1818)
Provinces	Pueblos	Native Citizens	Spanish Citizen
Marianas Islands	(Across the Province in General)	7,555	160

Felipe Bravo Census Demographics (Mindoro, 1818)
Province	Pueblo	Number of Native Families	Number of Spanish Filipino Families	Lacandula Families	Negro Filipino families	Morenos	Chinese Filipino families
Mindoro	Calapan (cabecera) y sus anejos Baco, Sabuan, Abra de Ilog y Dongon.	970	8				
	Naujan y sus anejos Pola, Pinamalayan, Mamalay, Manaol, Bulalacao, Bongabon, Manjao, Manguirin y la Isla de Ilin.	924	6				
Isla de Marinduque
	Santa Cruz de Napo.	1,600	1				
	Boac.	1,908	31		4		
	Gazan.	316	1		1		
Isla de Luban
	Luban.	1,699					
TOTAL		7,455	47		5		

Felipe Bravo Census Demographics (Misamis)
Province	Pueblo	Number of Native Families	Number of Spanish Filipino Families	Lacandula Families	Negro Filipino families	Morenos	Chinese Filipino families
Partido de Misamis
Misamis	Plaza y presidio de Misamis, y su anejo Loculan.	334					
	Presidio de Iligan, con su anejo Initao.	169					
Partido de Dapitan
	Dapitan, y su visita San Lorenzo de Ilaya.	666	2				
	Lobungan, y sus visitas Dipolog, Piao, Dohinog, y Dicayo.	701					
Partido de Cagayan
	Cagayan, y sus visitas Iponau, Mulingan, Agusan, Cagaloan, Lasaan, Balingasay, Salay, Quinoquitan ó Bacay, Mubijut, y la Mision de Pinangudan.	3,177	1				
Isla de Camiguin (Partido de Catarman)
	Catarman, y sus visitas Mambujao, Guinsiliban, y Sagay.	1,693	35				
TOTAL		6,740	38				

Felipe Bravo Census Demographics (Samar, 1818)
Provinces	Pueblos	Native Families	Spanish Filipino Families	Negrito Families	Chinese Filipino Families
Samar	Samar island, in general.	16,671	174		

Felipe Bravo Census Demographics (Zamboanga, 1818)
Provinces	Pueblos	Native Citizens	Spanish Filipino Soldiers	Kapampangan Soldiers	Spanish and Mexican Citizens
Zamboanga	Zamboanga-province and peninsula .	8,640	300	100	A very large but unknown amount of the civilian population, they are mostly employed in the navy and shipping.

=== Modern census of Chinese Filipinos ===
These are the results of a 1800s census of Chinese-Filipinos living in the Philippine Islands, and it shows the growth of the Chinese and the Chinese mestizo population amounting to nearly 10% of the Philippine population by the year 1894.

Race	Population (1810)	Population (1850)	Population (1894)
Malay (i.e., indigenous Filipino)	2,395,677	4,725,000	6,768,000
mestizo de sangley (i.e., Chinese mestizo)	120,621	240,000	500,000
mestizo de español (i.e., Spanish mestizo)	7,000 (tributes) x 5 (Minimum family-size) = 35,000	70,000	140,000
sangley (i.e., Unmixed Chinese)	7,000	25,000	100,000
Peninsular (i.e., Spaniard)	4,000	10,000	35,000
Total	2,619,705	5,184,814	7,772,628

Meanwhile, in 2013, according to older records held by the Senate of the Philippines, there were approximately 1.35 million ethnic (or pure) Chinese within the Philippine population, while Filipinos with any Chinese descent comprised 22.8 million of the population.

== Modern usage ==
In modern times, many of the descendants of Filipino mestizos may technically be classified as Tornatrás, but due to the term's obsolescence in mainstream usage, most Filipino mestizo descendants would usually identify as just mestizo or even just Filipino. In modern times, the descendants of the Filipino mestizos are still very active in the politics of the Philippines, especially in being the bulk of the country's political families and composing a considerable part of the Philippine population especially its bourgeoisie. The modern Chinese Filipino community and the few remaining Spanish Filipino families both contribute major shares to the Philippine economy. A majority of the Philippines' richest billionaires are either of Chinese Filipino background, such as the Sy family (SM Group, BDO, etc.), Gokongwei family (JG Summit, Robinsons, etc.), Lucio Tan & family (LT Group, Philippine Airlines (PAL), etc.), Tony Tan Caktiong & family (Jollibee Corp.), and Ramon Ang & family (San Miguel Corp. (SMC)); or (less commonly) of Spanish Filipino background, such as the Zobel de Ayala family (Ayala Corp.), Razon family (International Container Terminal Services, Inc. (ICTSI, Solaire, etc.), Aboitiz family (Aboitiz Equity Ventures, Aboitiz Power, etc.), Araneta family (Smart Araneta Coliseum), Lhuillier family (Cebuana Lhuillier), and Ortigas family (Ortigas Center).

Today, the word mestizo is shortened as tisoy just as is the word Pinoy is for Filipino. It is used for all Filipinos with foreign ancestry, particularly those born in the diaspora or as children of recent immigrants.

== See also ==
- Arab Filipino
- Filipino people of Spanish ancestry
- Demographics of the Philippines
- Ethnic groups in the Philippines

Comparisons with other countries

- Casta (comparable caste system in Latin America)
- Indo people of Indonesia
- Amerasian
- Afro-Asian
- Multiracial
- Template:Miscegenation in Spanish colonies
