= Isabelo Tampinco =

Filipino sculptor

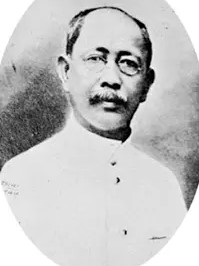
Isabelo Tampinco portrait

Isabelo Tampinco y Lacandola (born November 19, 1850 – January 30, 1933; born in Binondo in Tondo province), was a Filipino sculptor on Classical and Art Nouveau techniques and was trained in Escuela de Artes y Oficio de Manila. Out of a desire to create a uniquely Filipino style, he incorporated native flora and fauna designs in his sinuous openwork and Art Nouveau whiplash outlines style of woodcarving and named it Estilo Tampinco or Tampinco Style. Known for his work the busto de madera which was used in Centennial Exposition 1876 in Philadelphia representing the Philippines. He was then commissioned to create the Corinthian capitals for the Manila Cathedral which was then under construction after the Manila Earthquake 1852. He is still currently not recognized as a National Artist by the government.

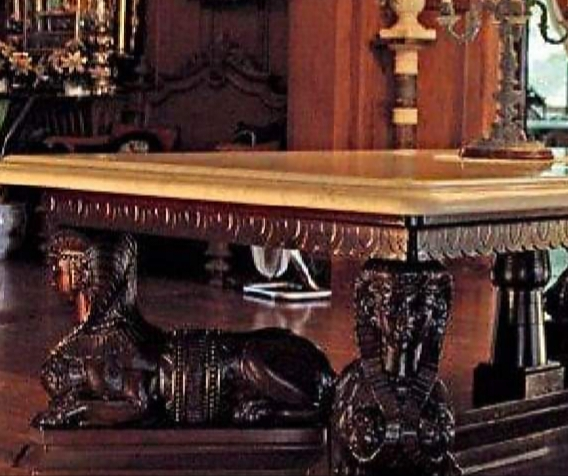
Table of Sphinxes, circa 1880s-1890s, Villa Escudero by Isabelo Tampinco.
