= Buntal =

Buntal may refer to:

- Buntal, the Tagalog name for buri palm (Corypha spp.) fibers
- Buntal hat, a traditional straw hat made from buntal fibers in the Philippines
- Buntal Hat Festival, a festival in Baliuag, Bulacan celebrating the buntal hat weaving traditions
