= Khlong Lan Phatthana =

Khlong Lan Phatthana คลองลานพัฒนา
- Tambon
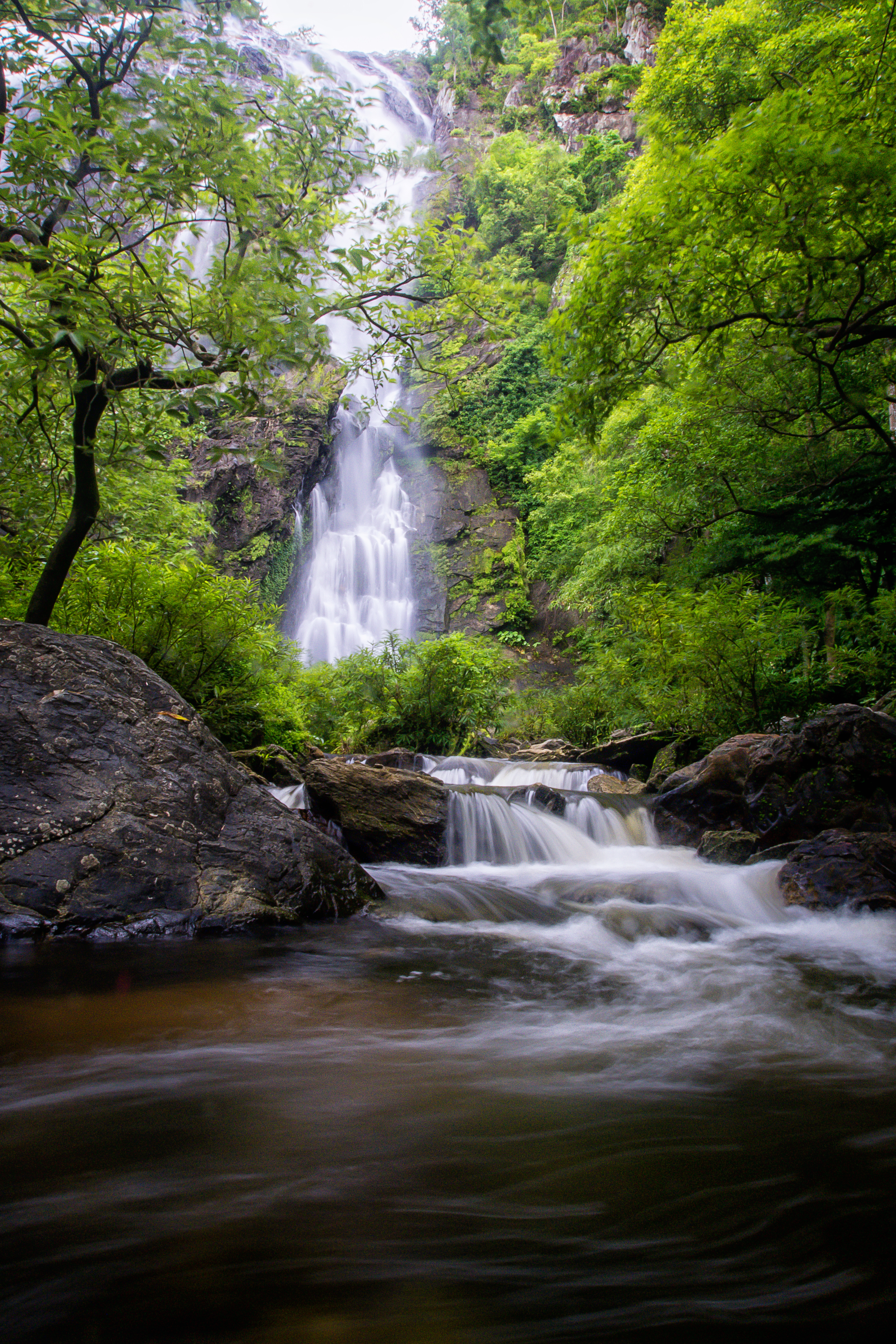
- Khlong Lan Waterfall
- Etymology: "Development of Khlong Lan"
- Interactive map of Khlong Lan Phatthana
- Coordinates: 16°07′19.3″N 99°19′44.7″E
- Country: Thailand
- Province: Kamphaeng Phet
- District: Khlong Lan
- Named for: Local geography and the way of life of the natives

Government
  - Type: Subdistrict-Municipality
  - Mayor: Vitthaya Thatsanapaiboon

Area
  - Total: 334 km^{2} (129 sq mi)

Population (2021)
  - Total: 22,537
  - Density: 67.48/km^{2} (174.8/sq mi)
- Time zone: UTC+7 (ICT)
- Postcode: 62180
- Area code: (+66) 02
- Geocode: 620303
- Website: https://www.khlonglanpattana.go.th/

Khlong Lan Phatthana (Thai: คลองลานพัฒนา, pronounced [kʰlɔ̄ːŋ lāːn pʰát.tʰā.nāː]) is tambon (subdistrict) of Khlong Lan district, Kamphaeng Phet province in upper central Thailand.

== Toponymy and population ==
Its name literally translates to "development of Khlong Lan". The word Khlong Lan Phatthana consists of three components: Khlong means "canal", Lan means "Cây lá buông", a species of palm, and Phatthana means "development". It is said that since this quarter is the origin of many waterways, the first settlers used palm leaves to roof their houses. Hence the name.

The subdistrict has about 20,000 populations, out of those 20,000 populations, 5,000 of them are ethnics. Those are Mon, Mien, Lahu, Lisu, Lua and Karen, six groups altogether.

== Geography ==
The area of Khlong Lan Phatthana is mostly forest and mountains, which are the origins of various water resources. Its adjoining other subdistricts are (from north clockwise) Khlong Nam Lai in its district, Ang Thong in Mueang Kamphaeng Phet district, Hin Dat and Pang Ta Wai of Pang Sila Thong district and Khlong Nam Lai in its district.

== Administration ==
Khlong Lan Phatthana is governed by the Subdistrict-Municipality Khlong Lan Phatthana (เทศบาลตำบลคลองลานพัฒนา).

The area also consists of 21 administrative villages (muban).

No.	Name	Thai
1.	Ban Khlong Lan	บ้านคลองลาน
2.	Ban Suan Som	บ้านสวนส้ม
3.	Ban Khlong Nam Lai Tai	บ้านคลองน้ำไหลใต้
4.	Ban Pak Khlong Lan	บ้านปากคลองลาน
5.	Ban Tha Kham Samakkhi	บ้านท่าข้ามสามัคคี
6.	Ban Loeng Krapong	บ้านเลิงกระพงษ์
7.	Ban Mai Thongchai	บ้านใหม่ธงชัย
8.	Ban Plaeng Si–Mae Phuet	บ้านแปลงสี่–แม่พืช
9.	Ban Khlong Toei	บ้านคลองเตย
10.	Ban Talay Phatthana	บ้านทะเลพัฒนา
11.	Ban Chokchai Phatthana	บ้านโชคชัยพัฒนา
12.	Ban Mo Tabaek	บ้านมอตะแบก
13.	Ban Khlong Pla Ra	บ้านคลองปลาร้า
14.	Ban Nong Pak Bung	บ้านหนองผักบุ้ง
15.	Ban Mo Raruen	บ้านมอระรื่น
16.	Ban Talat Mong	บ้านตลาดม้ง
17.	Ban Pa Son	บ้านป่าสน
18.	Ban Karieng Nam Tok	บ้านกะเหรี่ยงน้ำตก
19.	Ban Mo Makha	บ้านมอมะค่า
20.	Ban Mo Samran	บ้านมอสำราญ
21.	Ban Thung Kaeo Na Khwan	บ้านทุ่งแก้วนาขวัญ

== Places ==
- Khlong Lan Waterfall
- Mien Embroidery Museum
