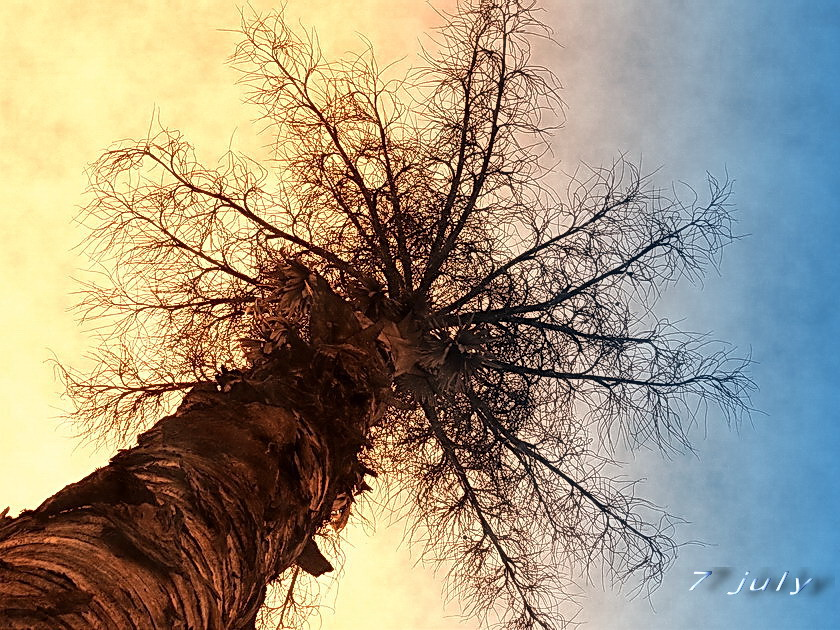

Scientific classification
- Kingdom: Plantae
- Clade: Tracheophytes
- Clade: Angiosperms
- Clade: Monocots
- Clade: Commelinids
- Order: Arecales
- Family: Arecaceae
- Genus: Corypha
- Species: C. lecomtei

Binomial name
- Corypha lecomtei Becc. ex Lecomte

= Corypha lecomtei =

Species of palm

Corypha lecomtei (common name Cay la buong) is a species of plant in the family Arecaceae. It is native to Thailand, Cambodia and Vietnam. It is threatened by habitat loss. Although known locally for centuries, it was formally described in 1916 by the botanist Odoardo Beccari.

Corypha lecomtei is one of the species used to make palm-leaf manuscripts.

== Description ==
This palm species has a trunk 3.5–4 m (11–13 ft) high and up to a full 1 m (3 ft 3 in) thick, and the palmate leaves are even larger, with petioles up to 8.8 m (29 ft) long(exceeded only by Musa ingens and Lodoicea) and canaliculated (round in cross-section with a deep groove on the upper surface). The leaf blade, or lamela, is 3.5–4 m (11–13 ft) in length. The crown spread at up to 27 m (89 ft) is second only to Lodoicea among monocots. The inflorescence, a panicle, is very large, up to 12 m (39 ft) height, of which the peduncle is 1.5–2 m (4 ft 11 in – 6 ft 7 in) with the remainder being the panicle per se. The width is about 6 m (20 ft). The plant flowers and fruits only once (monocarpy), at between 15 and 30 years of age, and then dies. The fruit is brownish and 7–8 cm (2.8–3.1 in) long and almost as wide.
