= Corypha microclada =

Conservation status
- Critically Endangered (IUCN 3.1)

Scientific classification
- Kingdom: Plantae
- Clade: Tracheophytes
- Clade: Angiosperms
- Clade: Monocots
- Clade: Commelinids
- Order: Arecales
- Family: Arecaceae
- Genus: Corypha
- Species: C. microclada

Binomial name
- Corypha microclada Becc.

Species of palm

Corypha microclada is a species of flowering plant in the family Arecaceae. It is found only in the Philippines. It is threatened by habitat loss.
