= Barong tagalog =

Filipino embroidered long-sleeved formal shirt

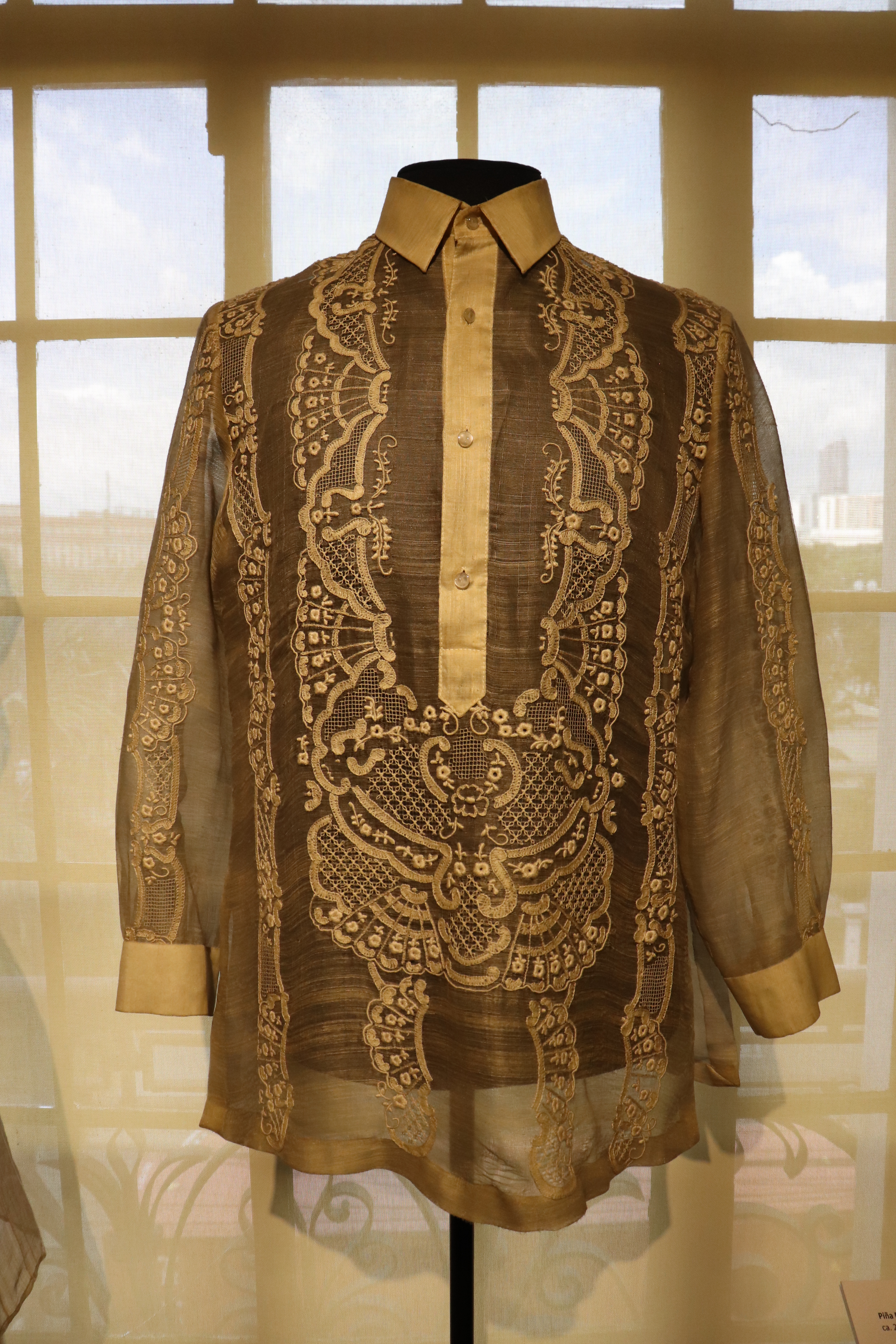
Barong tagalog made from piña fibers from the National Museum of the Philippines

The barong tagalog, more commonly known simply as barong (and occasionally baro), is an embroidered long-sleeved formal shirt for men and a national dress of the Philippines. Barong tagalog combines elements from both the precolonial native Filipino and colonial Spanish clothing styles. It is traditionally made with sheer textiles (nipis) woven from piña or abacá; although in modern times, cheaper materials like organza silk, ramie or polyester are also used.

It is a common formal or semi-formal attire in Filipino culture, and is worn untucked over an undershirt with belted trousers and dress shoes. Baro't saya is the feminine equivalent of barong tagalog, with the Maria Clara gown being the formal variant of the latter. Barong tagalog was also known as camisa fuera ("outer shirt") in Philippine Spanish.

== Etymology ==
The term "barong tagalog" is usually shortened in modern Filipino to "barong". Though this is grammatically incorrect, since "barong" contains the enclitic suffix -ng, which indicates that it is modified by or modifies the next word. The correct root word of barong is the Tagalog word baro, meaning "outfit" or "clothing", but this is rarely used.

Though "barong tagalog" literally translates to "Tagalog outfit", the "tagalog" in the name does not mean that it was a form of dress exclusive to the Tagalog people, as opposed to other Philippine ethnic groups. Barong tagalog (and baro't saya) were worn universally among Christianized lowlanders throughout the Philippines in the Spanish colonial period. Rather, the name was coined to distinguish the dress as native (hence "tagalog", i.e. Indio), as opposed to the styles of dress of Europeans and other foreign cultures. The "tagalog" descriptor is usually not capitalized.

== Description ==
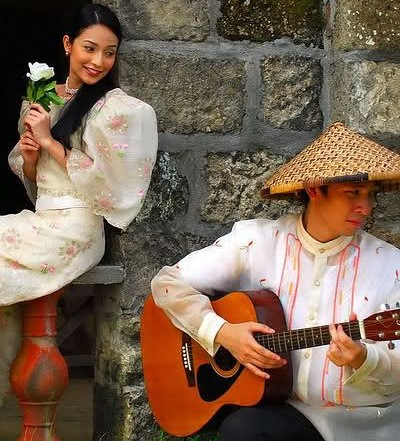
Barong tagalog worn with a salakot. The woman is wearing a terno.

Barong tagalog is a formal shirt usually made of sheer lightweight but stiff fabric known as nipis (usually woven from piña or abacá fibers). When using sheer fabrics, it is worn over an undershirt known as the camisón or camiseta, which can have short or long sleeves. The term camisa de chino is also used for collar-less and cuff-less undershirts, named after its resemblance to shirts worn by Chinese laborers. It is worn with belted trousers and dress shoes. Headgear, when worn, is either a salakot or a buntal hat (and historically also top hats or bowler hats). The ensemble mixes elements of both native and Spanish traditions.

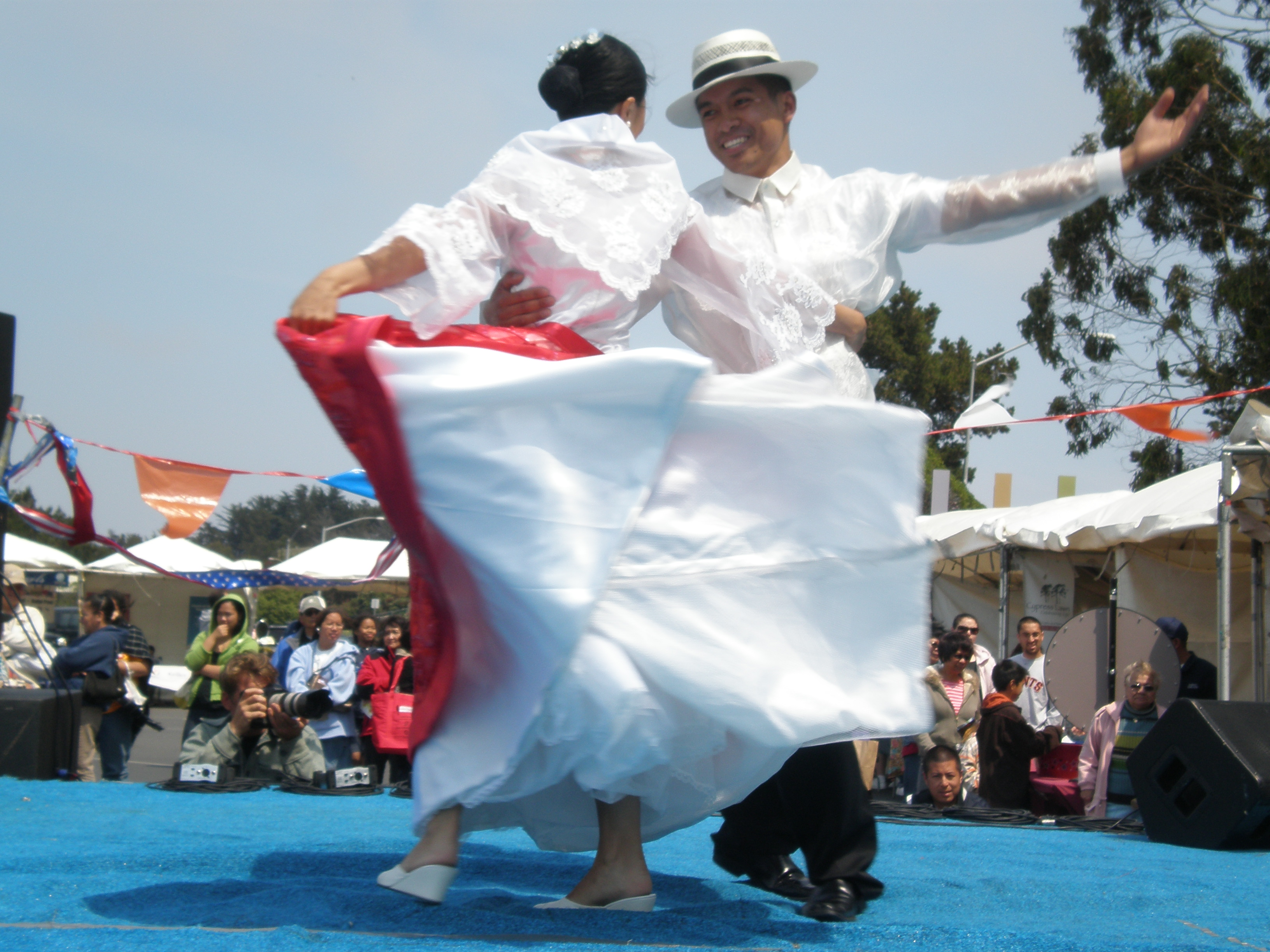
Dancers in barong tagalog (with a buntal hat) and traje de mestiza performing Jota Cagayana

Barong tagalog can vary considerably in terms of design and material used, but they share common characteristics of having long sleeves, embroidery, being buttoned (halfway or straight down the chest), and the absence of pockets. They are also worn loosely and have slits on both sides. Historically, the material used for barong tagalog depended on the social class of the wearer and the formality of the occasion. Barong tagalog made of fine, sheer material like nipis were worn largely by the upper classes or were used for festive occasions; while barong tagalog made of cheaper opaque materials like cotton or sinamay were used by lower classes or for daily wear. The quality of the material and the intricacy of the embroidery were often signs of the status and wealth of the wearer.

The embroidery of the barong tagalog are commonly placed on a rectangular section on the front of the chest (known as pechera, "shirt front", from Spanish pecho, "chest"), and/or over the entire shirt (sabog, from Tagalog for "scattered"). They feature various embroidery techniques, including calado and doble calado ("pierced" and "double-pierced", types of openwork drawn thread embroidery), encajes de bolilio (Venetian lace), and sombrado (shadow embroidery). They can also have other kinds of ornamentation, like alforza (pleats), suksuk (weft floats), and even hand-painted designs.

Occasionally feminized versions are worn by women, either as an egalitarian or haute couture fashion statement; or as a form of power dressing when worn by female politicians (such as Corazon Aquino during her presidency). However, the direct female counterpart of the barong tagalog is the baro't saya (or more formal versions of it like the traje de mestiza and the terno), and both share the same precolonial origins.

== History ==
=== Pre-colonial era ===
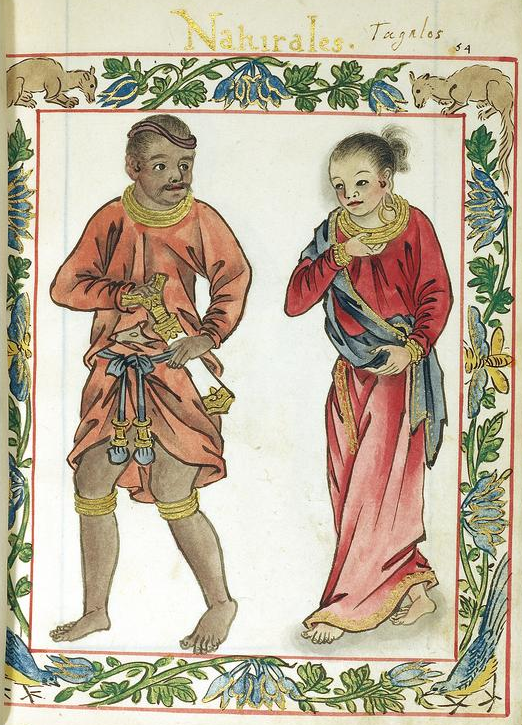
Tagalog maginoo (nobility) wearing baro and tapis in the Boxer Codex (c. 1590)

The barong tagalog originated from the baro (Tagalog for "shirt" or "clothing", with cognates like barú, badu, bado, or bayú in other Philippine languages; and baju in Malaysia and Indonesia), a simple collar-less shirt, tunic, or jacket with close-fitting long sleeves worn by both men and women in most ethnic groups in the pre-colonial Philippines. These were made from rough linen-like cloth woven from native abacá fiber, or from imported fabrics woven from silk, cotton, and kapok, among others. The design of the original baro was influenced by trade and contact with neighboring regions. These influences include the Malay and Javanese baju, and the South Asian kurta.

Among Tagalog men, the baro were commonly paired with loose trousers known as salawal (also spelled salaual) or a rectangular wraparound cloth known as tapis. The salawal were loose knee-length or shin-length trousers adapted from the Persian sirwal (probably via Malays).

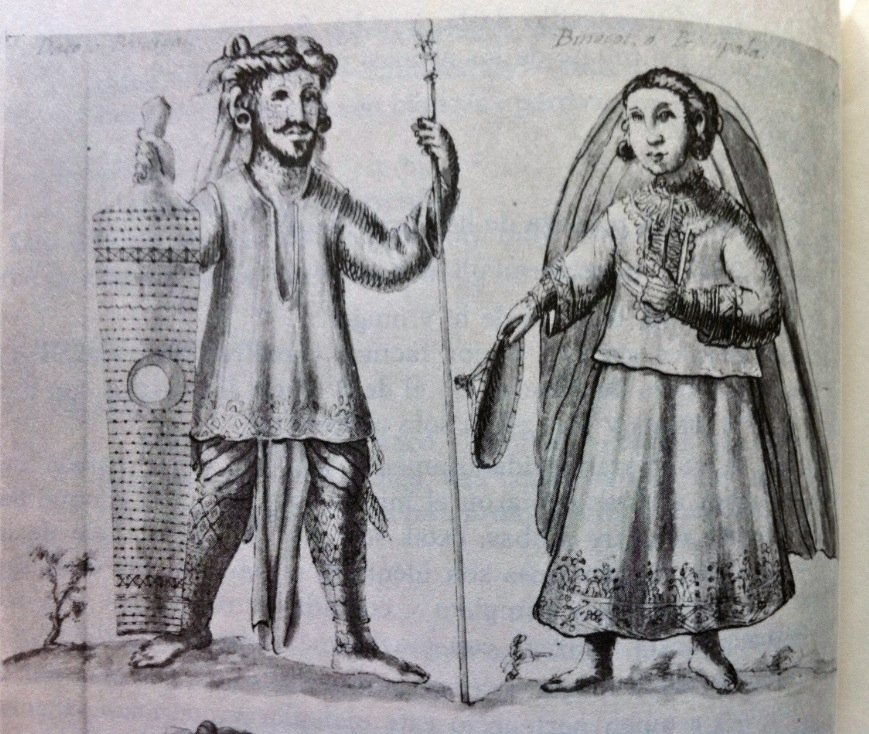
Traditional tunic (badu) worn with a bahag by a Visayan datu (left) from Historia natural del sitio, fertilidad y calidad de las Islas e Indios de Bisayas (c. 1668)

Similar trousers are still worn by various indigenous groups in Mindanao today, such as the Bagobo saruar, the Blaan salwal, and the Maranao saroar; though these are usually more tight-fitting than the salawal.

The tapis (also known as patadyong or malong in other Philippine ethnic groups, among other names) is a native tubular or rectangular wraparound cloth that covers the wearer from the waist down. It is worn by both men and women.

The baro usually extend to just slightly below the waist. However, in the Visayas, aside from similar shirts or tunics (known as badu, bado, or báyò in Cebuano, Waray, and Hiligaynon, respectively), men also wore colorful robe-like and coat-like variants that could extend to well below the knees (known as the marlota and baquero in Spanish, respectively). These were sometimes belted at the waist. Among Tagalogs, red dyes and gold trimmings were indicative of being a member of nobility (maginoo) or the warrior caste (maharlika).

=== Spanish colonial era ===
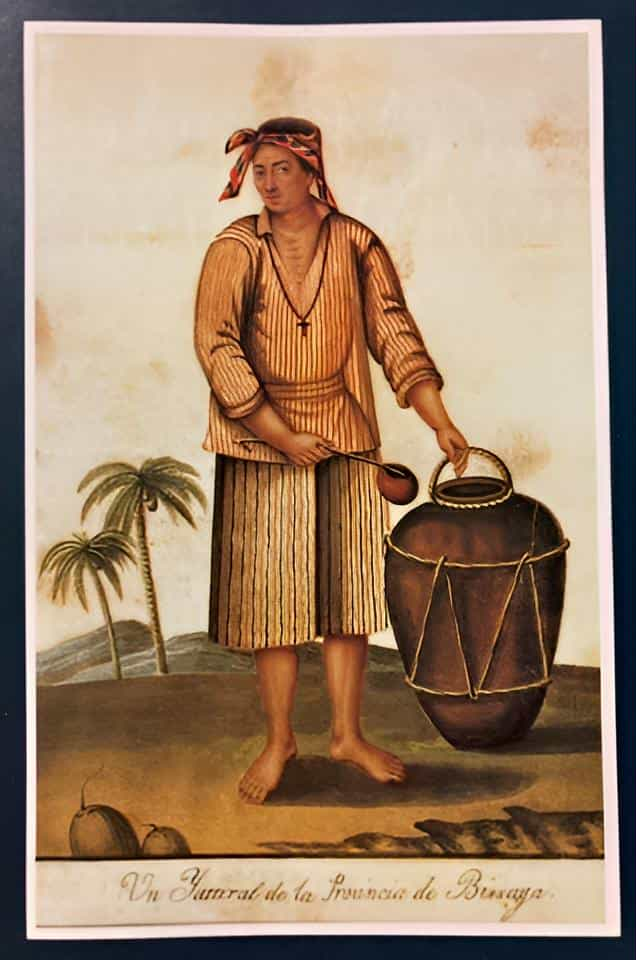
A Visayan water seller in an early barong tagalog (c. 1830) by Damián Domingo

Early records of clothing in the Philippines during the Spanish colonial era from the 16th to the 18th centuries were limited, thus the exact evolution of the precolonial baro to the modern barong tagalog can not be established with precision. Based on illustrations and written accounts, however, baro were still largely only worn by commoners during this period. They were mostly identical to precolonial baro and were made from opaque linen-like abacá textiles, and thus lacked the collars, buttons, and embroidery of later baro styles. The couturier Jose "Pitoy" Moreno has hypothesized that this transitional style of shirt was the camisa de chino of later centuries, which makes it a precursor to the barong tagalog. Depictions of members of the principalia upper classes (including natives and mestizos) in the 18th century showed that they invariably wore European-style clothing, often paired with sayasaya trousers. The sayasaya (not to be confused with the Spanish saya) was a type of loose silk trousers that feature embroideries along the hemline, presumably originating from Chinese trousers.

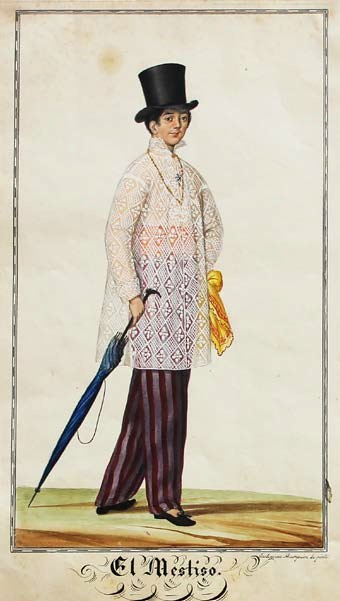
Barong mahaba with a ruff collar depicted in El Mestiso by Justiniano Asuncion (c. 1841)

The first barong tagalog precursor to gain favor among the local and mestizo elites was the barong mahaba (literally "long baro") which became prominent starting from the 1820s. These were much longer than the modern barong tagalog, reaching down to slightly above the knees. They were also commonly striped with bold colors like blue, red, or green. However, they already displayed hallmarks of the modern barong tagalog, including being made of sheer nipis material, embroidery, long sleeves, and a loose silhouette with slits on both sides. However, they lacked buttons.

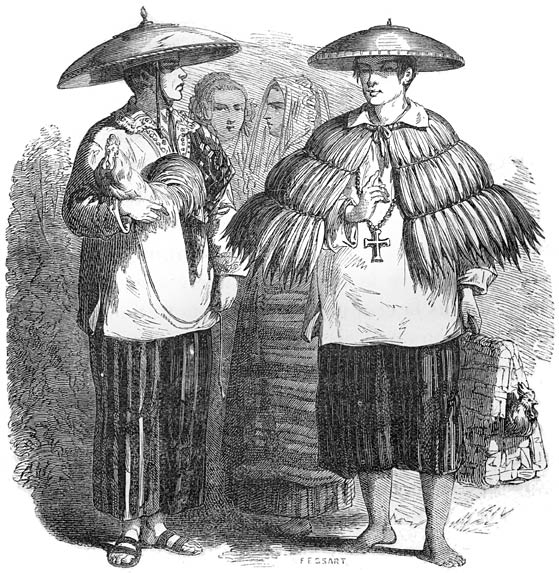
Full traditional Tagalog attire for working-class commoners during the Spanish colonial era, with barong tagalog, vestido anajao (indigenous rain capes), and salakot headwear (c. 1855)

Early examples of barong mahaba usually had high-standing collars or even Elizabethan-style ruffs with narrow cravats. Barong mahaba were generally worn with colorful straight-cut trousers with stripes, checkers, or plaid-like patterns (generally made from imported cambaya, rayadillo, and guingón fabrics), top hats (sombrero de copa), and a type of embroidered velvet or leather slip-on shoes known as corchos. While barong mahaba were generally worn loose, they were sometimes fastened by silk strings through three openings around the waist, either over or under the shirt. The sheer fabric used by barong mahaba also necessitated the wearing of an undershirt, known as camisón or camiseta, which was also worn on its own by commoners.

By the 1840s, barong mahaba largely fell out of fashion. In this period, it evolved into the modern "classic" barong tagalog, being much shorter with less ostentatious folded collars, while still retaining the sheer fabric and other baro characteristics. They were also worn with smaller hats like bowler hats (sombrero hongo) or native buntal hats. They were initially paired with looser trousers, though they gradually assumed the dimensions of modern trousers by the end of the 19th century. The colors of the barong tagalog also became more muted and monochromatic, in contrast to the colorful barong mahaba ensembles of earlier decades. Barong tagalog ensembles from the mid-19th century onwards were usually combinations of black and white, blue and white, or all-white. Baro worn by commoners also favored darker colors like brown or blue, usually paired with white silk pants.

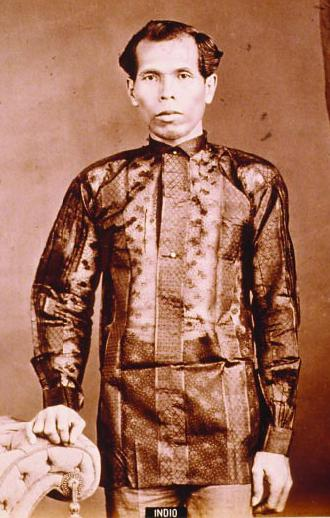
A Filipino man in a late 19th-century colored barong tagalog, from the collections of the Biblioteca Nacional de Madrid (c. 1870)

This type of barong tagalog were common among government workers and businessmen, who usually wore them underneath jackets (chaqueta). Sheer baro were also worn by natives and mestizos for fiestas, leisure activities like dancing, or for church. However, western-style suits became more popular among students of the burgeoning ilustrado educated class.

A notable variant of the barong tagalog during this period was the baro cerrada (literally "closed baro"). Its name is derived from its closed-neck collar. It was made from opaque material (which can be white or darker colors) and was paired with white pants. This style of baro remained popular up until the early 1900s.

A commonly repeated but false belief is that the Spanish colonizers made the natives wear their barong tagalog with the shirt tails hanging out to distinguish them from the ruling class; its translucent fabric allegedly showing that the wearer was not concealing a weapon underneath. There are no historical records of this anytime from the 16th to the late 19th century. No regulations mandated the use of sheer material or banned the tucking in of men's shirts. Baro were always worn untucked, even in the precolonial period; and up until the 19th century, they were not made from translucent nipis fabric.

While the style and textiles worn by different classes did vary over the Spanish colonial period, this was due to fashion, wealth, and class distinction, rather than law. Most commoners throughout the colonial period wore baro made from cheaper and more durable opaque textiles, while expensive nipis fabrics were worn mostly by the upper classes. Natives (indios descended from precolonial nobility) and mestizos (both mestizos de Español and mestizos de sangley) were also part of the aristocratic upper classes (principalia) and it wasn't restricted to Europeans.

Indios and mestizos, regardless of class, wore barong tagalog and European-style clothing depending on what they can afford and which were fashionable at the time. The wearing of barong tagalog did have racial connotations however, since most people of unmixed European descent (the insulares, criollos, and peninsulares) retained their own dress styles and thus inadvertently differentiated from Filipino fashions.

=== American colonial era ===
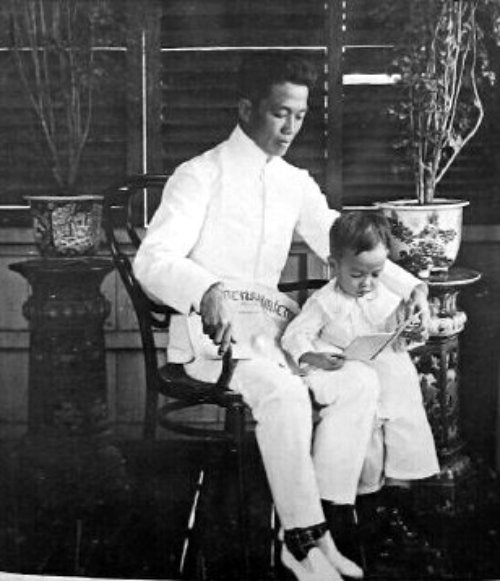
Emilio Aguinaldo, in a baro cerrada, with his son (1906)

The popularity of barong tagalog further waned during the American colonial period. It was replaced by suits (known as Americana in the Philippines) and tuxedos in most formal functions. In contrast, women persisted in wearing the native terno (a modernized and unified version of the baro't saya), which was then associated with suffragists. Barro cerrada remained popular as informal leisure clothing, however.

=== Modern era ===
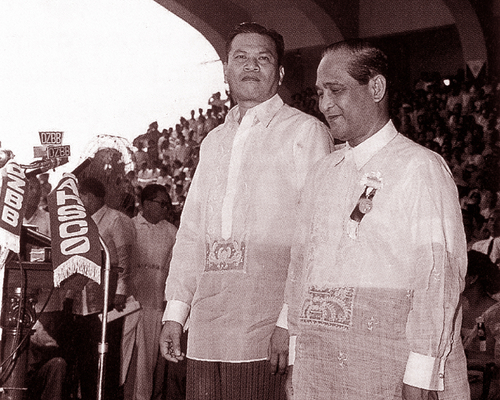
Ramon Magsaysay and his (eventual) successor, Vice-President Carlos P. García, at their inauguration on December 30, 1953

After the Philippine independence on July 4, 1946, Americana or a suit and tie continued to be the dominant formal wear, worn by presidents Manuel Roxas and Elpidio Quirino. In 1953, however, President Ramón Magsaysay won the election by being "a man of the masses". He deliberately wore a barong tagalog at his inauguration. The press played up the symbolism of Magsaysay in a barong tagalog and the outgoing Quirino in a western-style suit as symbolic of the "break" between the independent Philippines and its colonial past. He also wore barong tagalog in most public and private state functions. Magsaysay's use of the barong tagalog as formal attire was unprecedented in modern times. His example was followed by other Philippine presidents, and by the time of Diosdado Macapagal's term in the 1960s, it had regained its status as formal wear. Ferdinand Marcos, in particular, wore barong tagalog at almost every occasion. In 1975, Marcos issued a decree for the barong tagalog, along with the baro't saya, to become the official national attire. June 5 to 11 was also declared as the "Barong Tagalog Week".

Following Marcos' decree, barong tagalog became widely mandated as office wear for both employees of the government and private companies, as well as school uniforms. In the 1970s to the 1980s, companies like the Philippine Airlines, Ayala Corporation, and the Allied Bank were prescribing barong tagalog as their uniforms. Various semi-formal and informal versions of the barong tagalog developed during this period, including the short-sleeved polo barong and the linen barong. In 1998, Supreme Court Justice Hilario Davide, Jr. mandated the wearing of barong tagalog for all employees of the Judiciary of the Philippines.

While the barong tagalog was now regarded as formal wear, it did not gain popularity as a wedding attire for grooms in the early post-war Philippines. Most weddings featured a groom in a western suit and a bride in a terno. However, by the 1990s, the situations had reversed. Grooms now almost always wear barong tagalog, while women favored western-style bridal gowns.

== Types of material used ==
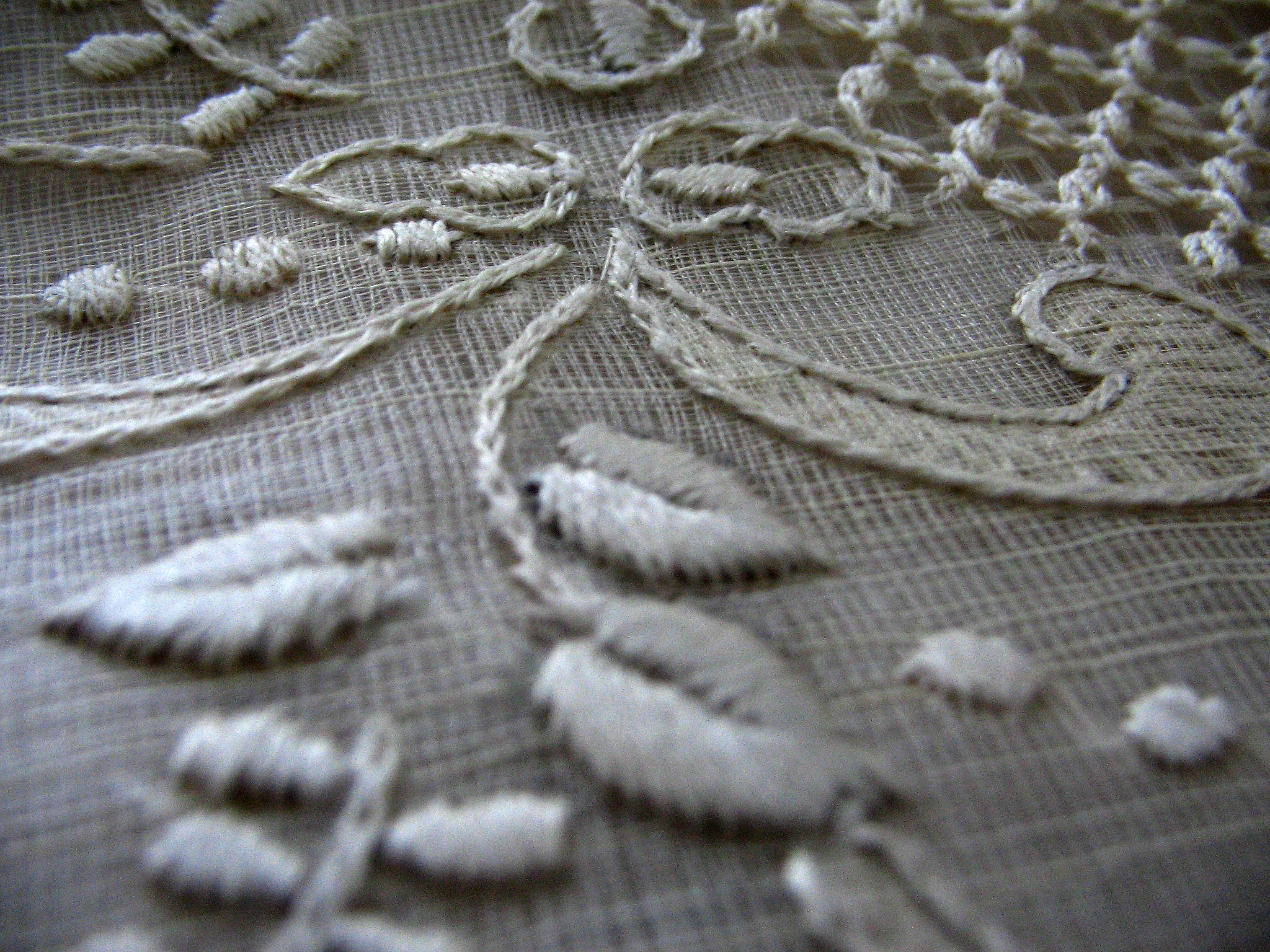
Detail of the fabric and embroidery on a barong tagalog

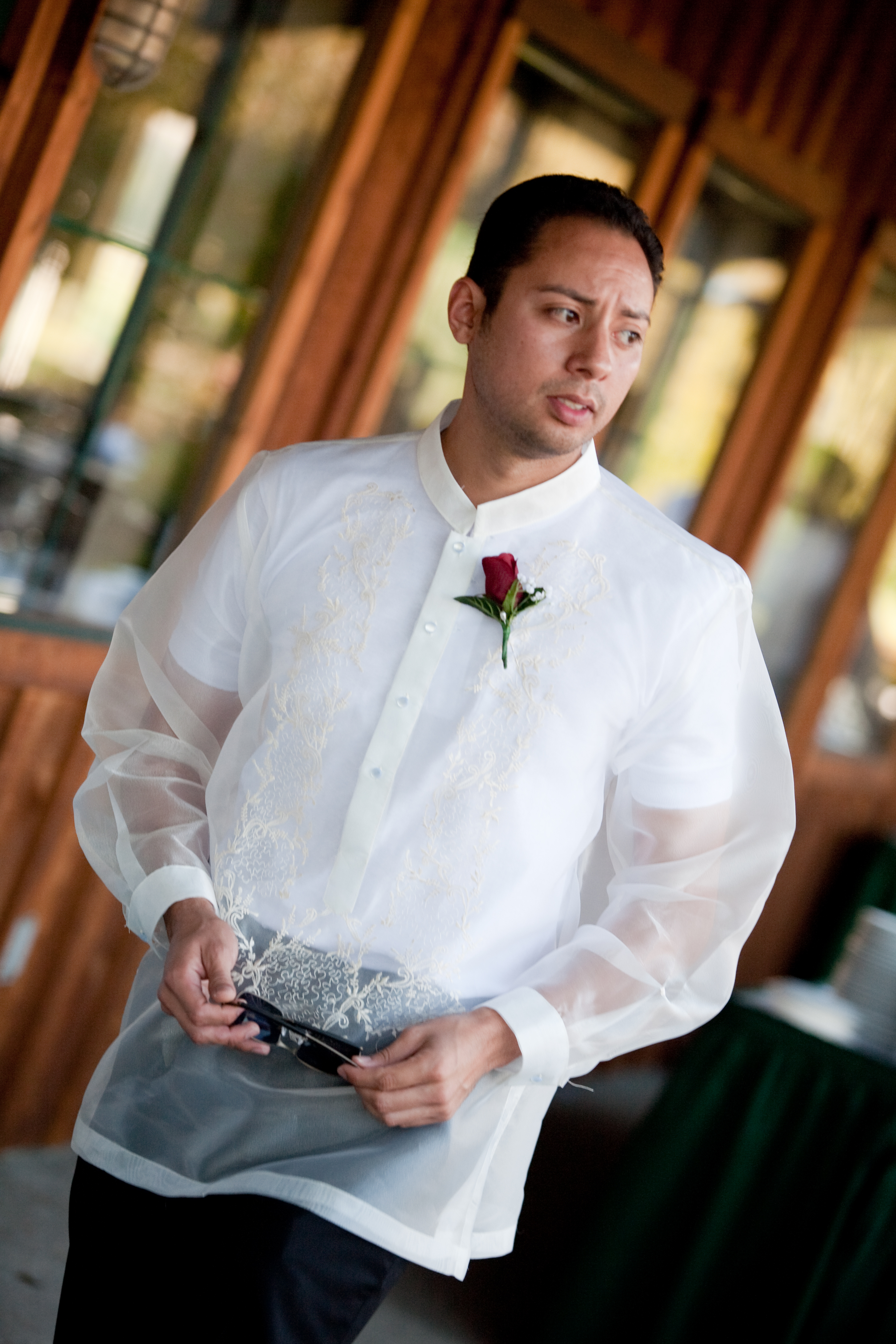
Typical organza barong tagalog worn at a wedding

The finest barong tagalog are made from a variety of indigenous sheer fabrics (nipis). The most common traditional materials used are listed below. The fabrics used can also be composites of two different materials (like cotton and jusi or silk and piña). Additionally, more informal barongs can also utilize common opaque textiles like cotton, linen, polyester, or ramie.

- Piña – a traditional sheer fabric hand-woven from pineapple leaf fibers. It has a fine lustrous silk-like texture and has a natural yellowish tinge. It is the most expensive and highly prized material for barong tagalog, due to its manufacturing difficulty, quality, and rarity. It is characterized by fibers of uneven thickness which gives the fabric the appearance of having streaks.
- Piña seda – a traditional fabric created by interweaving piña and silk (seda) fibers. It is usually less expensive than barong tagalog made purely from piña, but is more expensive than other types of material. It is characterized by piña fibers on the transverse weft, and silk fibers on the longitudinal warp. It is a lighter yellow color than barong tagalog made from piña.
- Jusi – a traditional sheer fabric hand-woven from abaca fibers. It has a polished texture and a natural off-white color. It is less expensive than the piña, but is still regarded as a classic material. It has a tendency to become brittle over time. It also commonly interweaves silk, cotton, or other fibers. It is sometimes misidentified as being made from "banana" fibers. From the 1960s onwards, most fabrics labeled as jusi are actually jusilyn and organza fabrics. These fabrics are not traditional, but are cheaper mechanically woven substitutes largely from China.
- Piña jusi – similar to piña seda, it interweaves piña fibers with jusi fibers. It is less expensive than pure piña, but is more expensive than pure jusi.
- Pinukpok - a traditional rough and opaque fabric made from abaca fibers. It is primarily a product of the Bicol Region.
- Sinamay – a traditional opaque fabric made from loosely woven abaca fibers. It is cheaper than other abaca materials and has a coarse texture.
- Jusilyn – a modern mechanically woven fabric made from silk or cotton and polyester, specifically made to resemble jusi fabric. It is less expensive than the jusi and is more opaque. Unlike piña, it has fibers with an even texture and an off-white color, lacking the characteristic streaks of piña or jusi. It can sometimes be chemically painted to give an appearance closer to traditional fabrics, and may even be sold off as counterfeit piña or piña seda fabrics.
- Organza – a modern mechanically woven fabric made from silk or polyester from China. It has a polished and even texture, although it can be regarded as being too shiny. It is the cheapest material used for formal barong tagalog.

== Variations ==
The term barong tagalog is almost exclusively used to refer to the formal version of the barong. Named variants of the barong tagalog include the following:

=== Historical ===
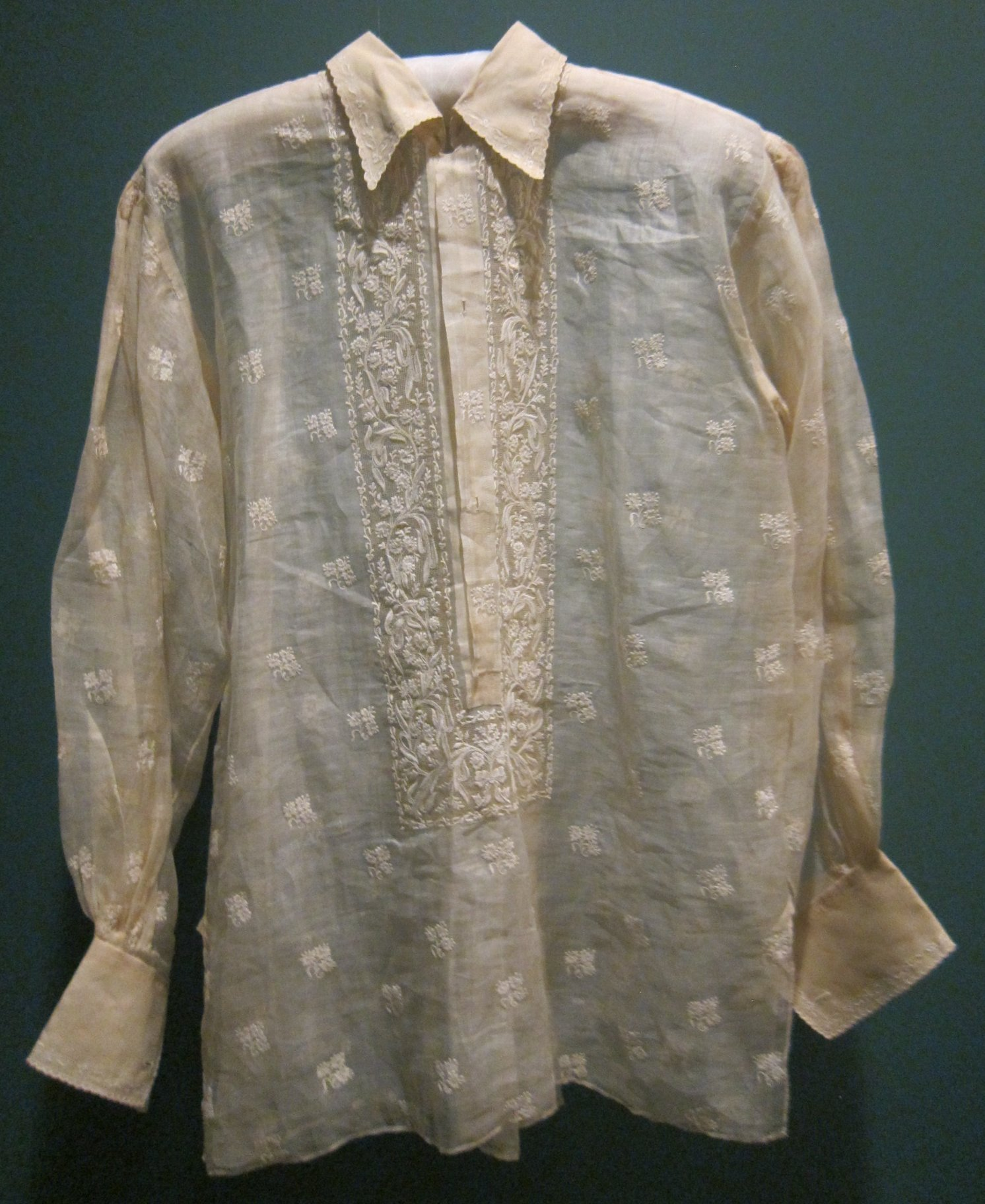
Late 19th century barong tagalog made from piña with both pechera ("shirt front") and sabog ("scattered") embroidery, from the Honolulu Museum of Art

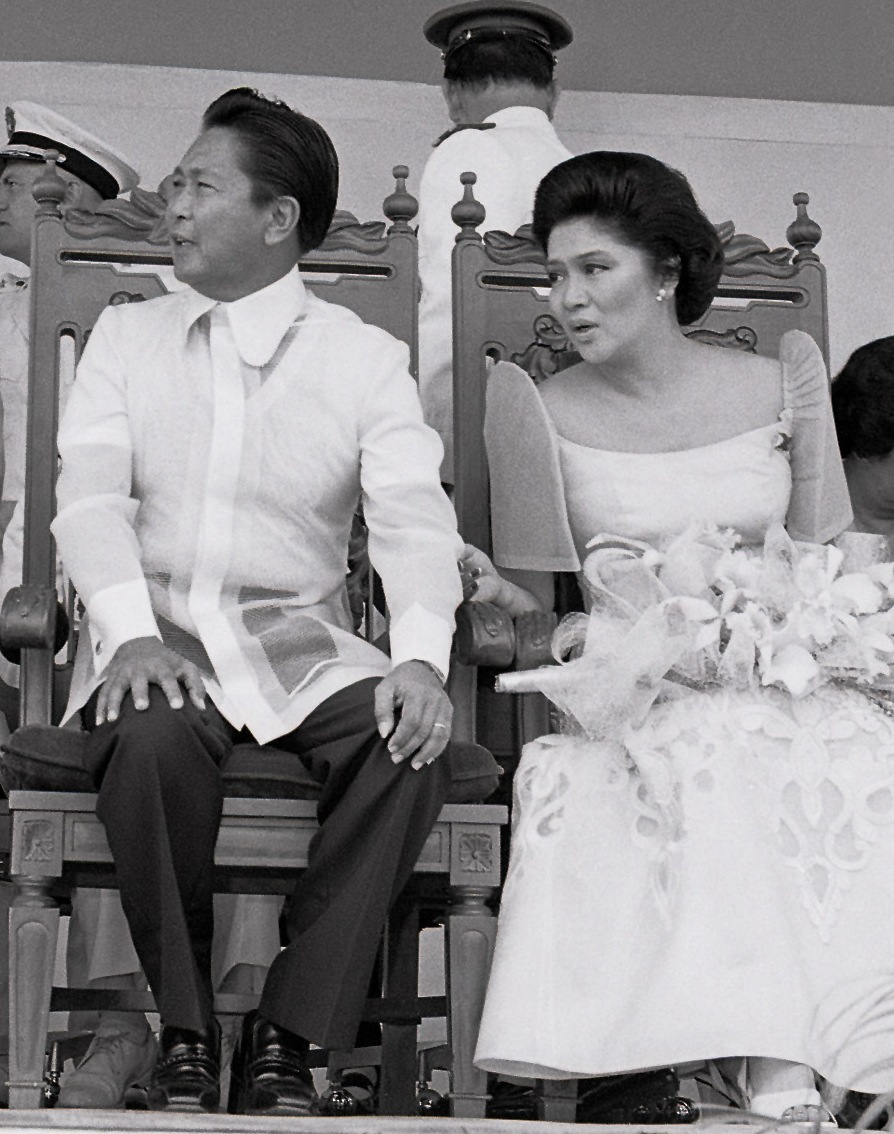
Ferdinand Marcos (in a Pierre Cardin barong tagalog) with Imelda Marcos (in a terno) during the 1979 Clark Air Force Base turnover ceremonies

- Barong mahaba (lit. "long baro"), is a type of barong tagalog popular in the early 19th century. They were much longer than modern barong tagalog, reaching to lengths just slightly above the knee. They were made of sheer material (commonly with longitudinal stripes) and were typically paired with straight-cut pants with striped patterns. They were normally worn loose, but they can sometimes be cinched at the waist. They featured a variety of collar styles, including Elizabethan-style ruffs.
- Baro cerrada, also known as Americana cerrada, is a type of barong tagalog that became popular during the 1890s and the early American colonial period. The name means "closed shirt" and refers to its closed-neck collar. They were made of opaque material (which can be white or darker colors) and were usually worn with white pants. During the American period, they were worn as less formal everyday wear, as opposed to American-style suits.
- Pinukpok was a longer coat-like version of barong tagalog from the mid-19th century. Its name (literally "beaten") comes from the fabric used, pinukpok, which were abacá fibers manually pounded into strands before being woven into a rough opaque textile. They were worn by government officials like tenientes del barrio (village leaders) and gobernadorcillos (municipal governors) as overcoats. Today, the name is also applied to formal opaque barong tagalog with conventional cuts made from the same abacá material.

=== Modern ===
- Pierre Cardin barong tagalog is a distinctive type of modern formal barong tagalog popularized by dictator Ferdinand Marcos. It was created by fashion designer Jean Paul Gaultier of Pierre Cardin. It featured elements of fashion in the 1970s, including a tapering close-fitting cut, rigid oversized point collars (often characterized as an "Elvis Presley collar") and cuffs, and flared sleeves. It was also worn with flared pants.
- Polo barong refers to a short-sleeved version of the barong, often made with linen, ramie or cotton. This is the least formal version of the barong and is frequently used as men's office wear (akin to the Western suit and tie). It can be worn tucked or untucked.
- Gusót-mayaman and linen barong are barongs made with linen or linen-like fabrics (like ramie). The name, loosely translated, means "wrinkled [shirt] of the rich" and refers to their tendency to acquire paper-like creases when worn because of the material; as well as a tongue-in-cheek reference to the way the wrinkles are tolerated because of the comparatively high status of the wearer. These are generally considered less formal than the barong tagalog, and are also reserved for everyday office wear.
- Shirt-jack barong are cut in shirt-jacket style, with a characteristic wide hem band at the bottom edge of the shirt. It is worn untucked. It is usually made of polyester-cotton, linen-cotton and the typical gusót-mayaman fabrics. Popularised by politicians wearing this style during campaigns or field assignments, it gives the wearer a look that is somewhere between casual and dressed-up. This type of shirt is, however, considered inappropriate for very formal occasions such as weddings.

== Relation to the guayabera ==
The barong tagalog is a possible precursor to the guayabera, a shirt popular in Latin American communities since the late 19th century. It may have been introduced first to Mexico via the Manila-Acapulco Galleons and were adapted to use local fabrics in the absence of piña or abacá. A variant of the guayabera traditionally worn in Yucatan is still called "filipina."

== Gallery ==
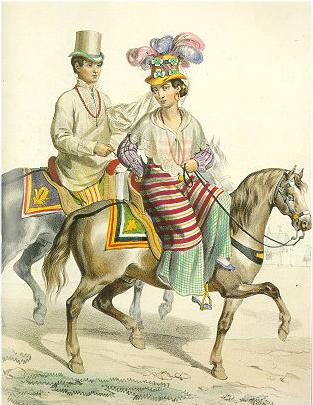
Mestizos in the Philippines in barong tagalog and baro't saya by Jean Mallat de Bassilan (c. 1846)

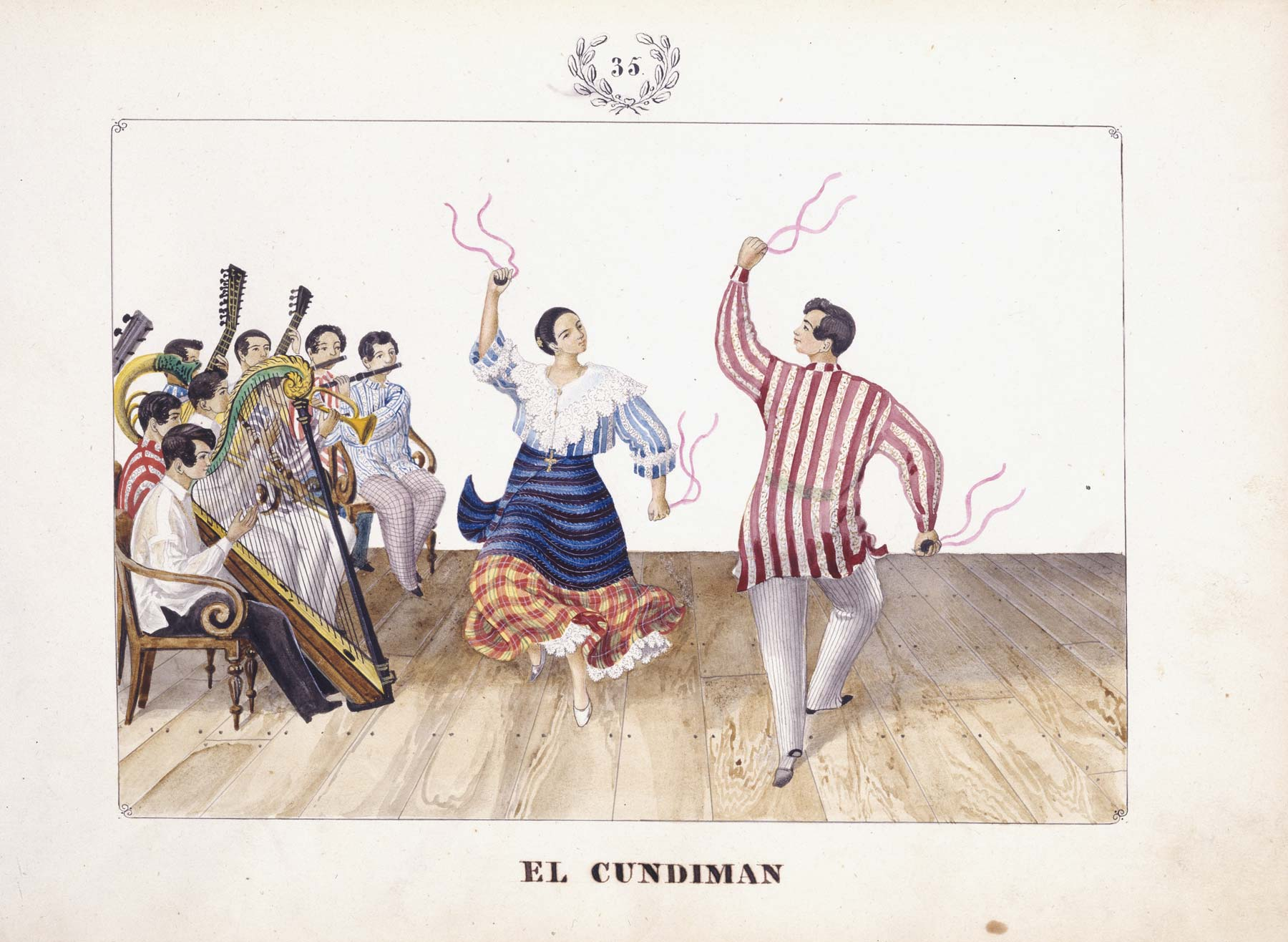
El Cundiman by José Honorato Lozano (c.1847), showing dancers in colorful striped barong tagalog and baro't saya

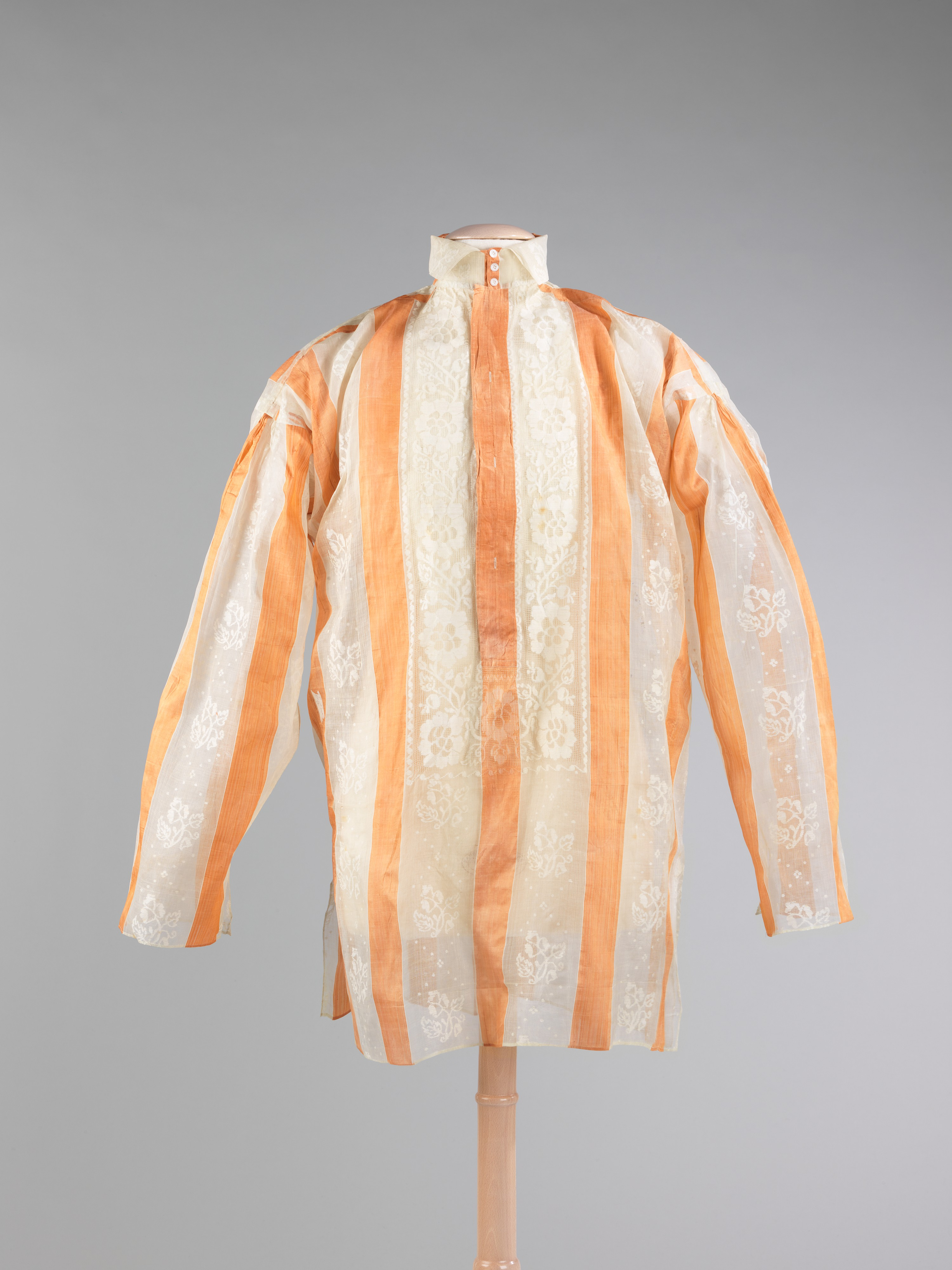
Striped barong tagalog made from piña in the Metropolitan Museum of Art (c. 1850)

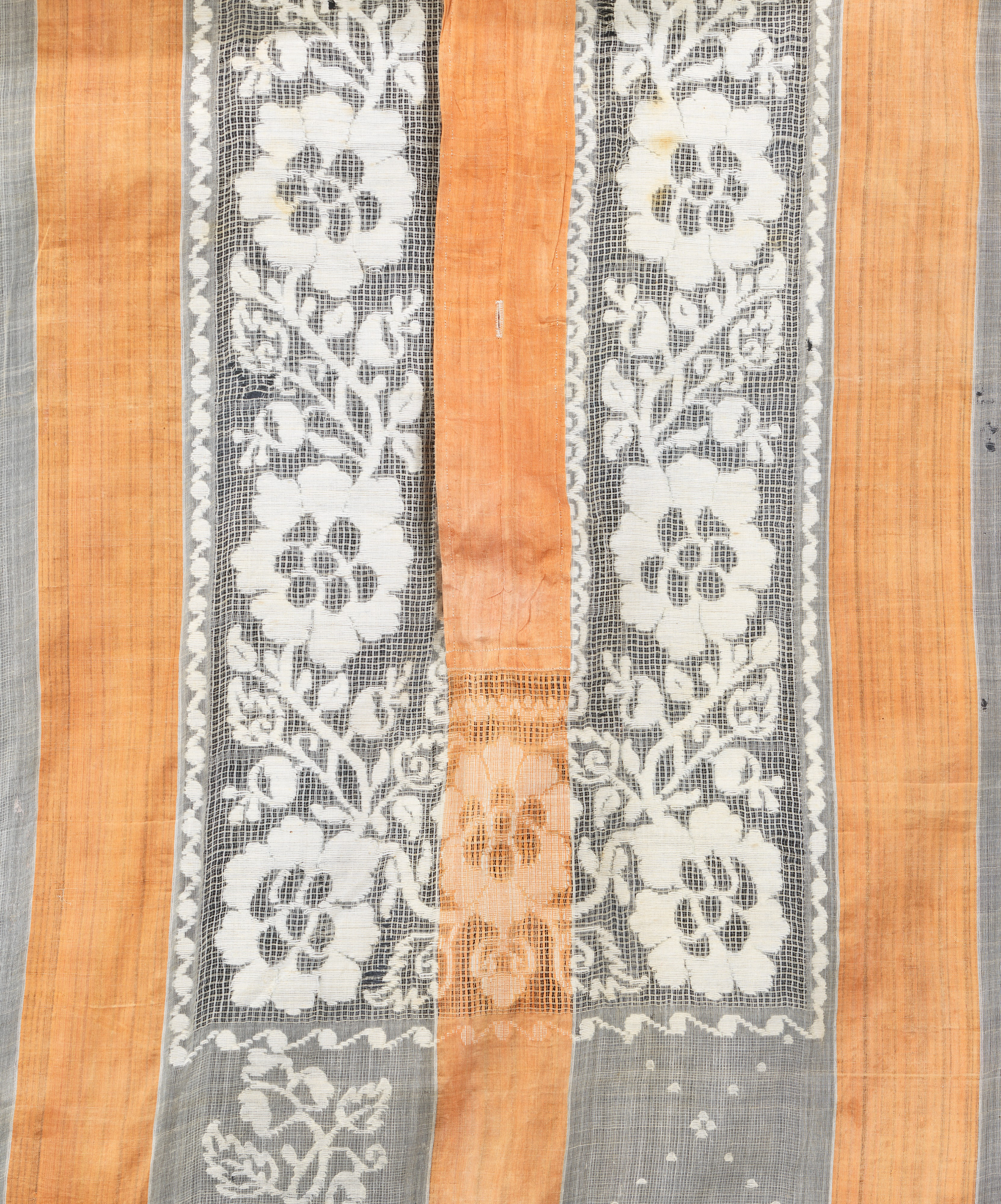
Detail of the calado embroidery on the pechera of a piña barong tagalog (c.1850)

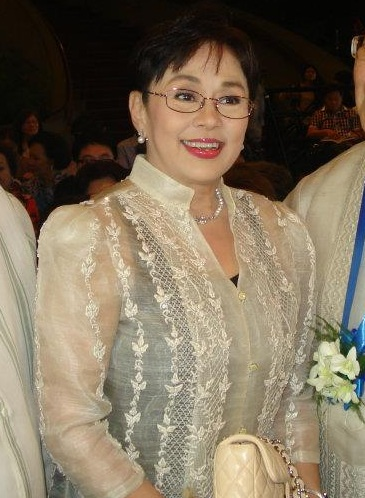
Vilma Santos in a feminized version of the barong tagalog

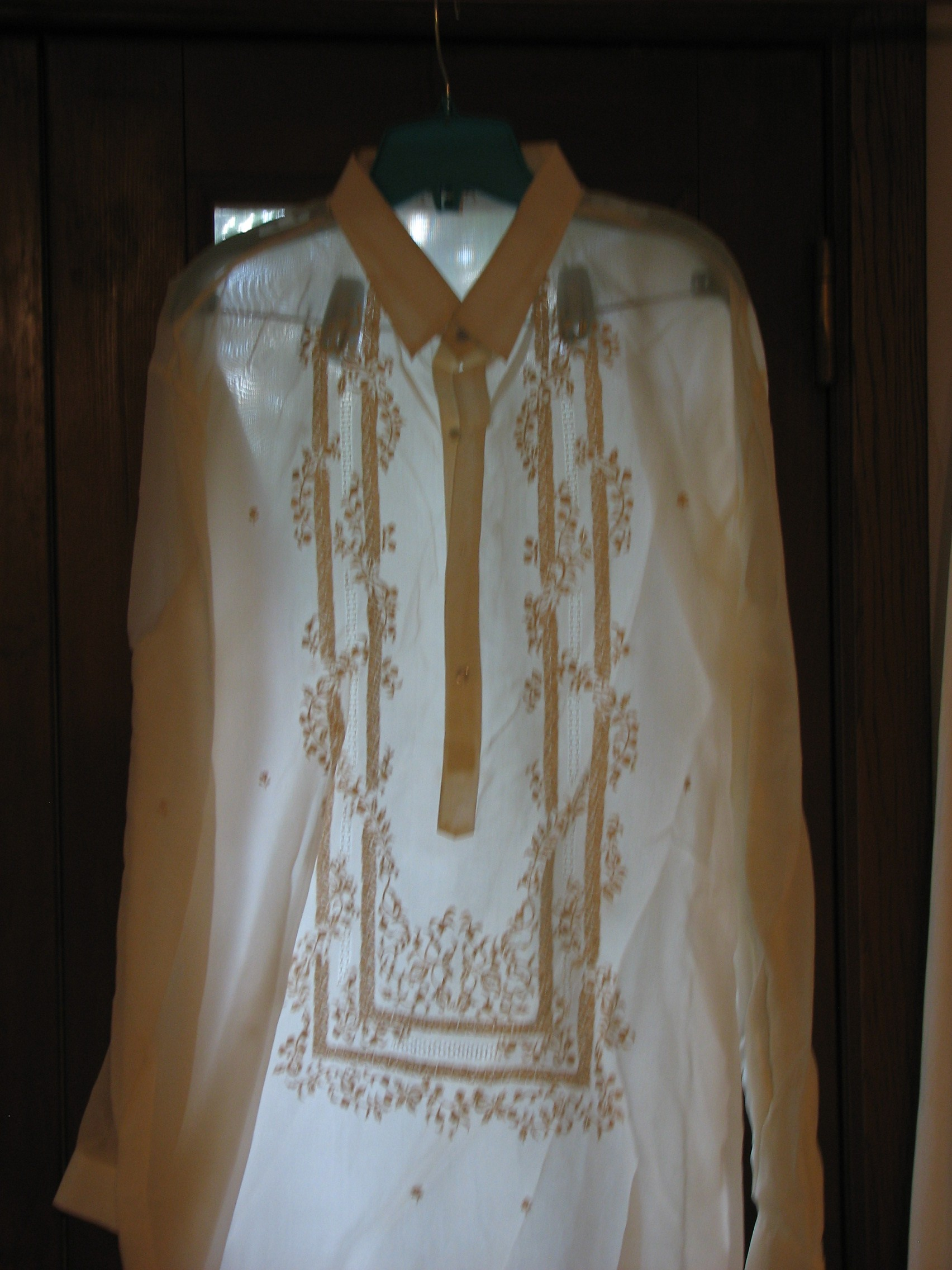
A barong tagalog placed against the light, showing the translucency of the fabric

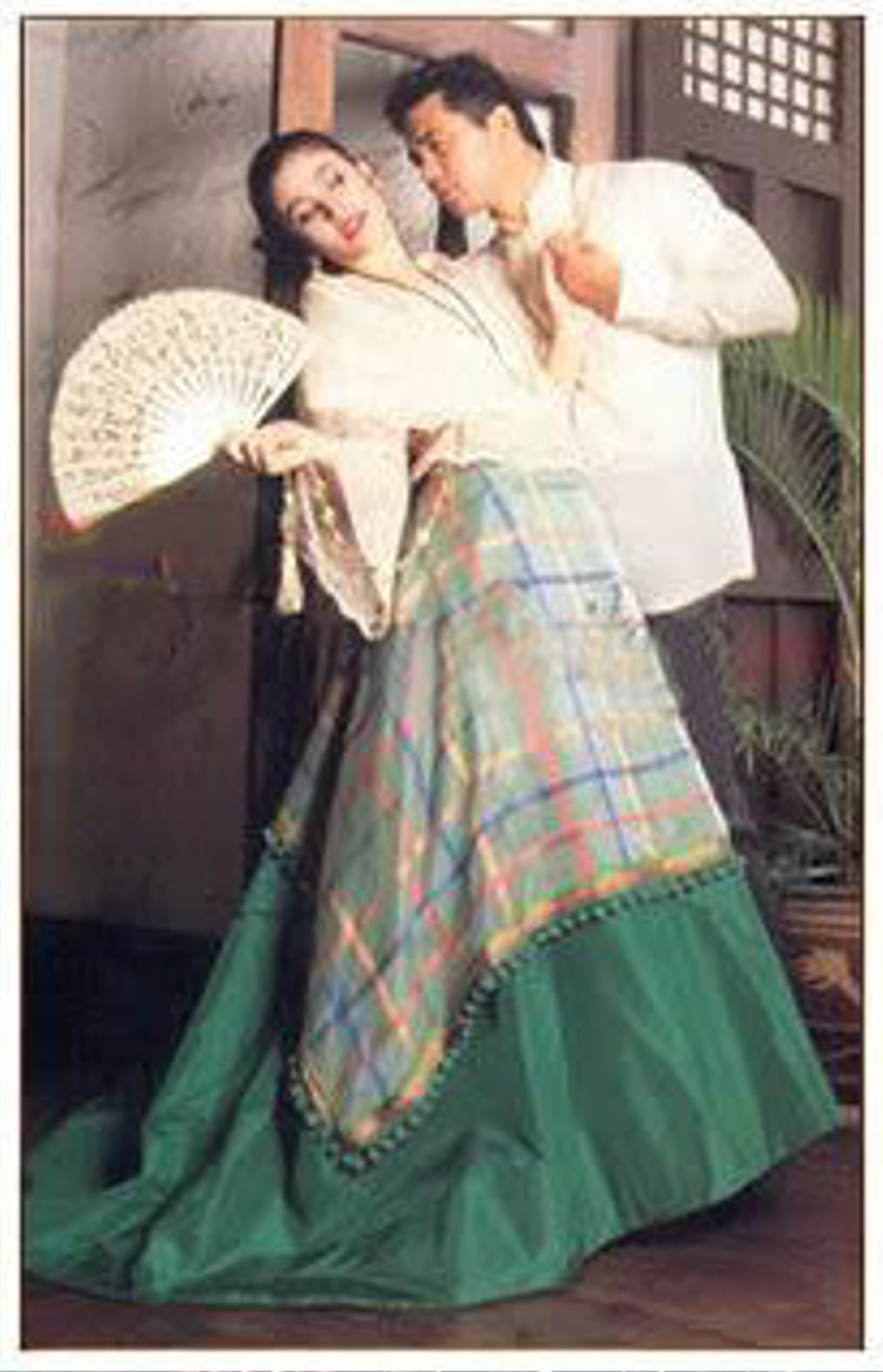
Baro't saya and barong tagalog worn by dancers of Cariñosa

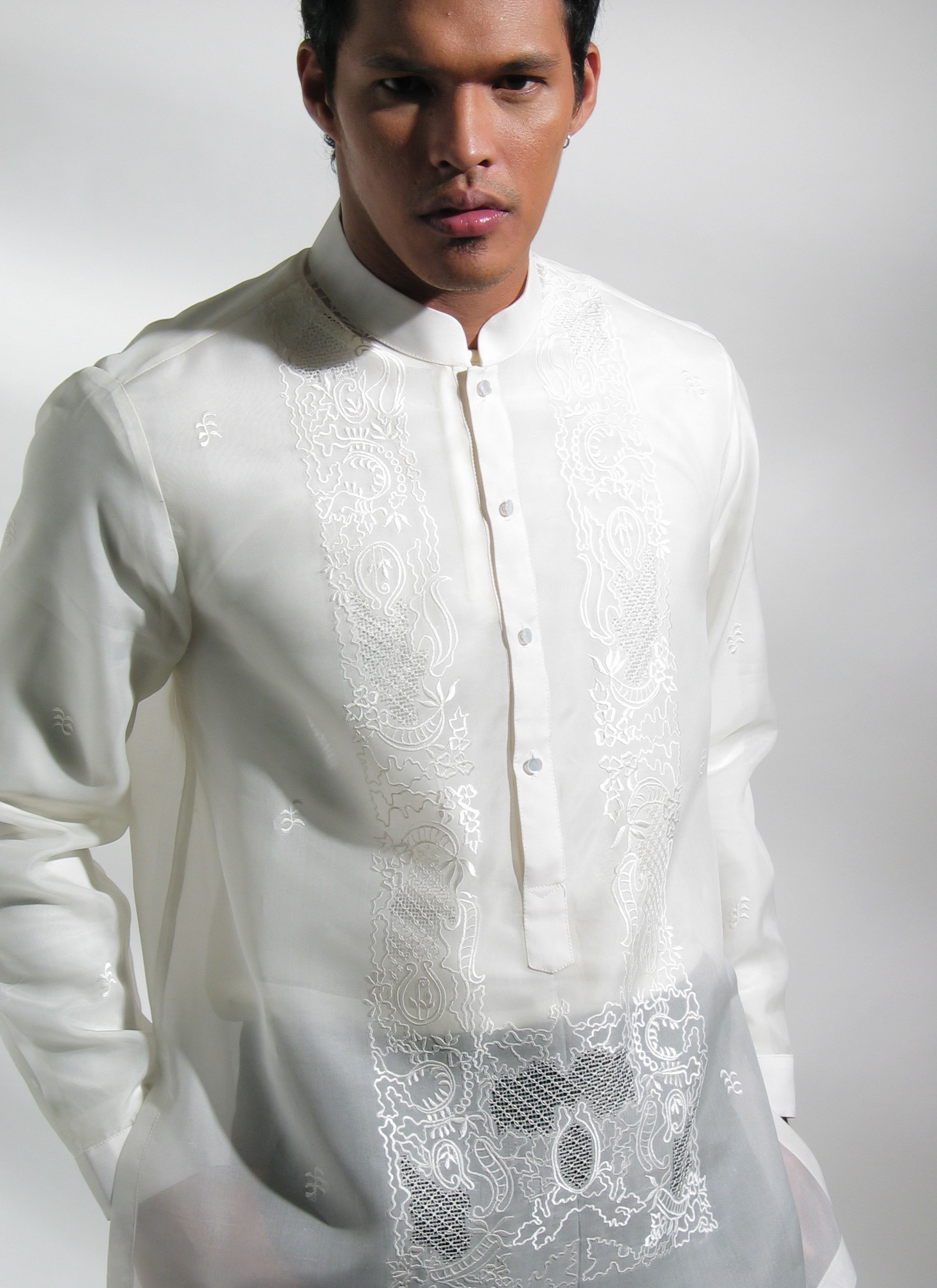
Modern jusi barong tagalog with a band collar

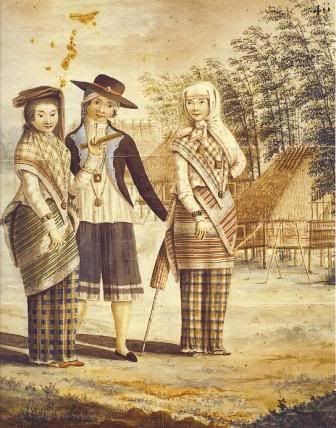
Barong tagalog worn under a European-style coat (c. 1790s)

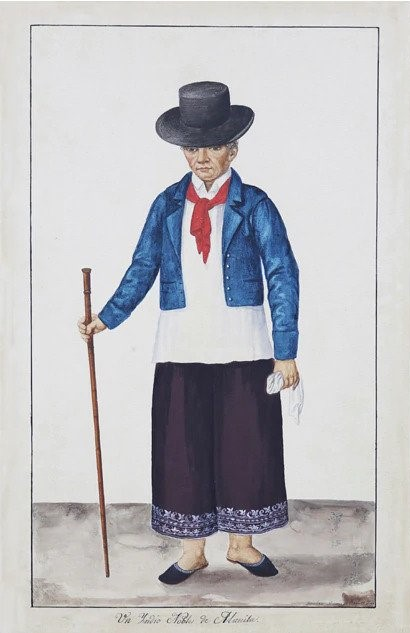
Barong tagalog under a coat with a neckerchief (c. 1830s). Note the sayasaya trousers.

== See also ==
- Fashion and clothing in the Philippines
- Manila shawl
- Baju Melayu
