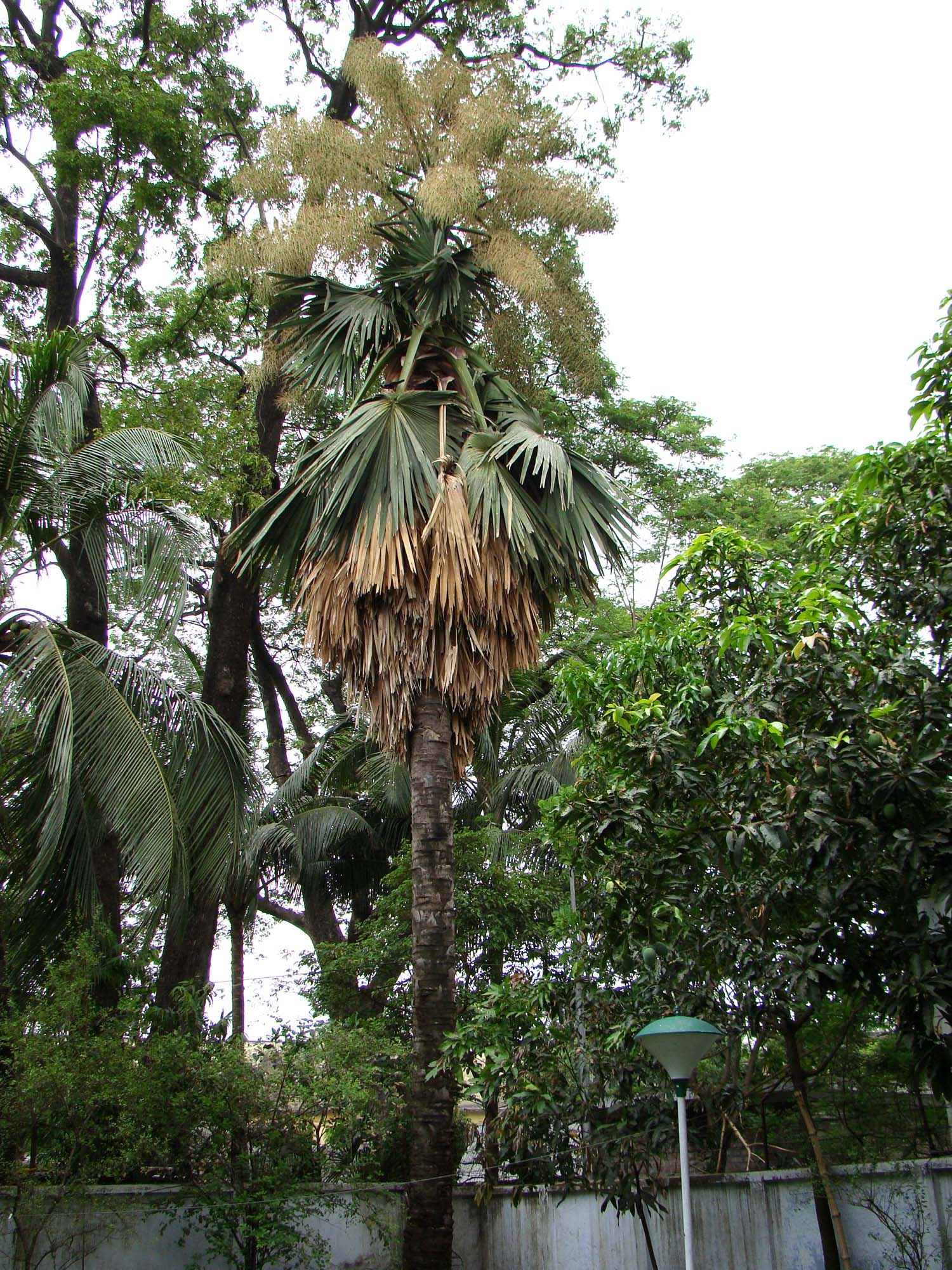
- In Bangladesh

Conservation status
- Extinct in the Wild (IUCN 3.1)

Scientific classification
- Kingdom: Plantae
- Clade: Tracheophytes
- Clade: Angiosperms
- Clade: Monocots
- Clade: Commelinids
- Order: Arecales
- Family: Arecaceae
- Genus: Corypha
- Species: C. taliera

Binomial name
- Corypha taliera Roxb.

Synonyms
- Taliera bengalensis Spreng.; Corypha careyana Becc.; Taliera tali Mart. ex Blume

= Corypha taliera =

Species of palm tree

Corypha taliera is a species of palm, originally native to Myanmar (Burma) and the Bengal region of India and Bangladesh. It was first discovered by Scottish botanist William Roxburgh. It has been listed extinct in the wild in the IUCN Red List. The species is locally known as Tali Palm or Talipalm.

== Description ==
Corypha taliera is a solitary, massive, moderately slow growing, monoecious palm with a hapaxanthic or monocarpic mode of growth, where the plant dies after setting seed. It has a rough, grey-brown trunk, 27.5 m (90 ft) tall, 91.5 cm (36.0 in) in diameter with no obvious leaf scars, and massive partially segmented, palmate (fan) leaves, 6 m (20 ft) long, 6 m (20 ft) wide, dark green above and beneath, on the end of a 3 m (10 ft)-long petiole, armed with black teeth. These are one of the largest palmate leaves of any plant. These, together with those of Corypha umbraculifera, hold the record of the largest palmate leaves of any plant. The main identification characteristic of Corypha taliera is that the tree has no persistent leaf-bases when young, unlike other Corypha species which hold huge rhino horn shaped leaf-bases for many years before shedding them to reveal a rough grey trunk.

== History ==
The plant was discovered in the 1950s growing in the scrub jungle and was identified as a member of the genus Corypha by university professor M. Salar Khan. It was then identified as a tali palm tree by Indian scientist Shamal Kumar Basu, when he was on a visit to Dhaka in 2001. It was subsequently protected in what later became the enclosure of the residential quarters of the Pro-Vice-Chancellor.

On October 18, 2008, daily newspaper Prothom Alo reported that the plant was about to bloom. According to botanists, the plant would die soon after it blooms.

On October 22, 2008, the Daily Naya Diganta and Jaijaidin reported that there were a few more plants still remaining at Edward Park, Bogra. In January 2010, the 30-foot tree flowered.

On October 5, 2015, Prothom Alo reported that about 300 plants were grown from the seed from the plant that bloomed in 2008 in Dhaka University. According to the news, tissue culture was not successful, but University's gardener Jahangir Alam sowed the seeds and became successful. Seedlings were distributed to other universities in Bangladesh, namely Dhaka University, Rajshahi University and Comilla University and to the Department of Forestry.

The last known member of this species, except for the one at Dhaka University, was in the district of Birbhum in West Bengal. It was cut down, despite protests by local scientist Shamal Kumar Basu, by the locals who thought it to be a "ghost palm tree" when it bloomed in 1979. This superstition was caused by the signature "horns" grown by the tree prior to blooming. However, Shamal Kumar Basu later identified the tree at Dhaka University as a tali palm tree in 2001.

Goutam Roy, Headmaster of Rampurhat Chatra High School, was able to acquire five plants from Dhaka University and plant them in the Visva-Bharati University campus.
