= Khlong Lan district =

Khlong Lan คลองลาน
- District
- District location in Kamphaeng Phet province
- Coordinates: 16°12′13″N 99°19′16″E
- Country: Thailand
- Province: Kamphaeng Phet
- Seat: Khlong Nam Lai

Area
  - Total: 1,140.2 km^{2} (440.2 sq mi)

Population (2005)
  - Total: 63,106
  - Density: 55.3/km^{2} (143/sq mi)
- Time zone: UTC+7 (ICT)
- Postal code: 62180
- Geocode: 6203

Khlong Lan (Thai: คลองลาน, pronounced [kʰlɔ̄ːŋ lāːn]) is the westernmost district (amphoe) of Kamphaeng Phet province, central Thailand.

== History ==
The area was originally part of Mueang Kamphaeng Phet district, then named Tambon Pong Nam Ron. The tambon Khlong Lan and Pong Nam Ron were upgraded to a minor district (king amphoe) on 1 June 1977. It was officially upgraded to a full district on 20 March 1986.

== Geography ==
Neighboring districts are (from the east clockwise): Mueang Kamphaeng Phet, Khlong Khlung, Pang Sila Thong of Kamphaeng Phet Province; Umphang, Phop Phra and Wang Chao of Tak province.

== Administration ==
The district is divided into four subdistricts (tambons), which are further subdivided into 69 villages (mubans). There are no municipal (thesaban) areas. There are four tambon administrative organizations (TAO).

No.	Name	Thai name	Villages	Pop.
1.	Khlong Nam Lai	คลองน้ำไหล	28	19,634
2.	Pong Nam Ron	โป่งน้ำร้อน	10	9,119
3.	Khlong Lan Phatthana	คลองลานพัฒนา	21	23,699
4.	Sak Ngam	สักงาม	10	10,654
