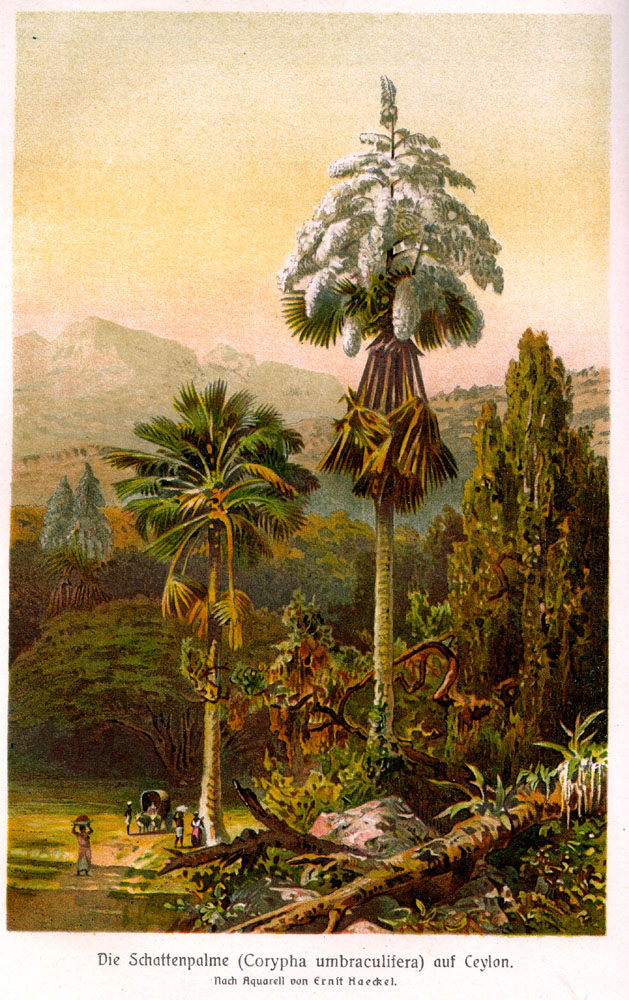
- Corypha umbraculifera painting (1913)

Scientific classification
- Kingdom: Plantae
- Clade: Embryophytes
- Clade: Tracheophytes
- Clade: Spermatophytes
- Clade: Angiosperms
- Clade: Monocots
- Clade: Commelinids
- Order: Arecales
- Family: Arecaceae
- Subfamily: Coryphoideae
- Tribe: Corypheae
- Genus: Corypha; L.

Synonyms
- Bessia Raf.; Codda-Pana Adans. nom. illeg.; Dendrema Raf.; Gembanga Blume; Taliera Mart.

= Corypha =

Genus of palms

Corypha or the gebang palm, buri palm or talipot palm is a genus of palms (family Arecaceae), native to India, Malaysia, Indonesia, the Philippines, New Guinea and northeastern Australia (Cape York Peninsula, Queensland). They are fan palms (subfamily Coryphoideae), and the leaves have a long petiole terminating in a rounded fan of numerous leaflets.

All are large palms with leaves ranging from 2–5 metres in length. They reach heights of 20–40 m and with a trunk diameter of up to 1-2.5 m. All the species are monocarpic and die after flowering. The genus is relatively slow growing and can take many years to form a trunk.

Species include:

Flower	Name	Common name	Distribution
	Corypha lecomtei Becc. ex Lecomte		Thailand, Vietnam, Laos, Cambodia
	Corypha microclada Becc.		Philippines
	Corypha taliera Roxb.		India: West Bengal, Bangladesh, Myanmar
	Corypha umbraculifera L.	Talipot palm	Sri Lanka, southern India; naturalized in Thailand, Cambodia, Myanmar, Andaman Islands, Mauritius
	Corypha utan Lam.(syn. C. elata, C. gebang)	Gebang palm, buri palm or cabbage palm	India: Assam, Andaman Islands, Indochina, Malaysia, Indonesia, Philippines, New Guinea, Australia: Queensland, Northern Territory

== Gallery ==
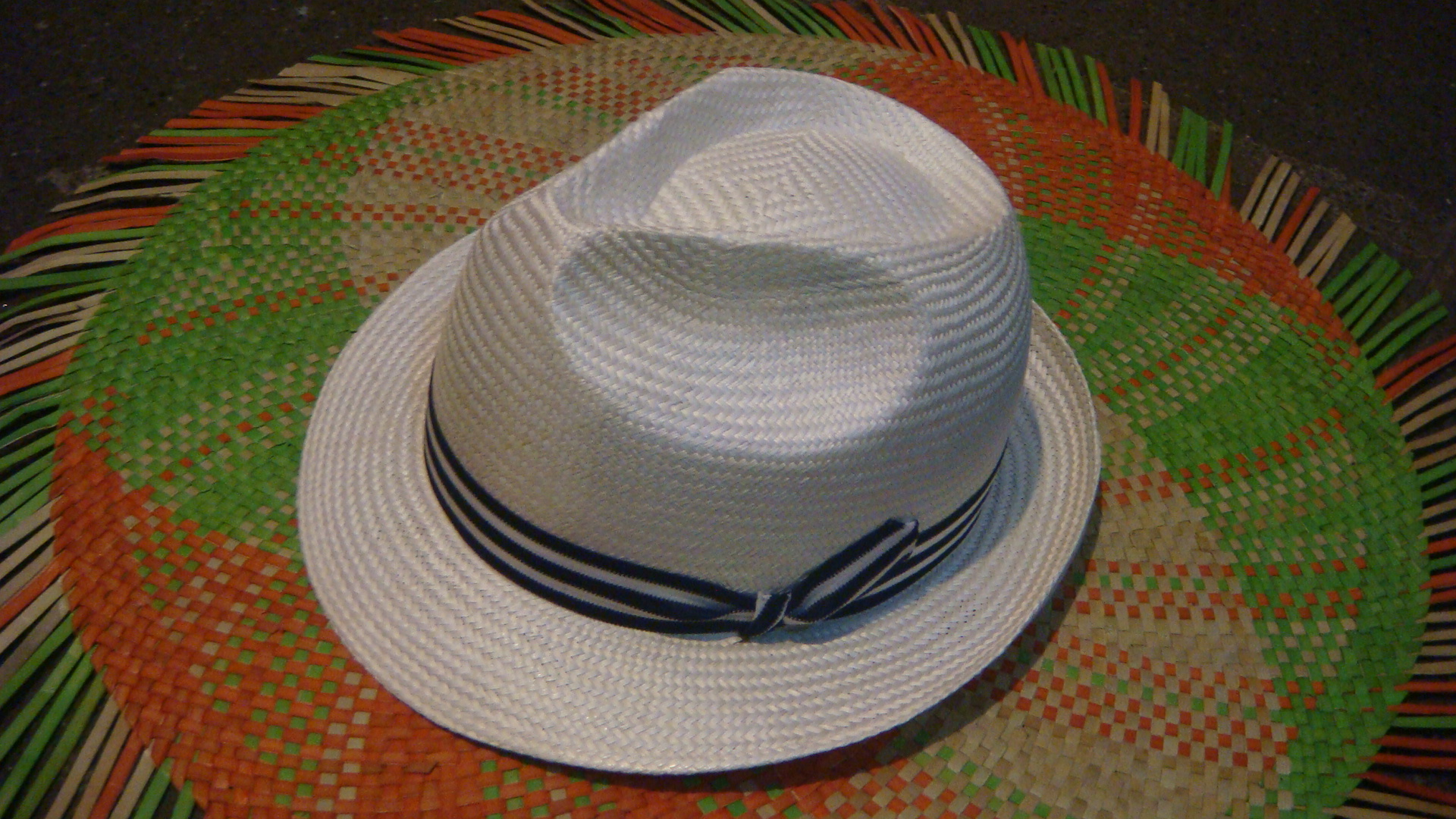
A traditional Filipino buntal hat made from buri palm Corypha (gebang palm, buri palm or talipot palm, genus of palms (fanily Arecaceae)

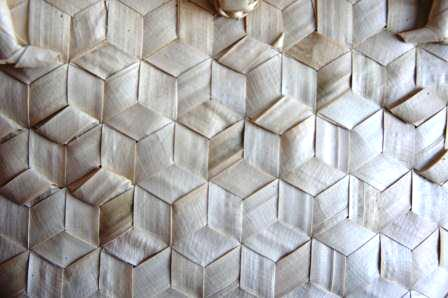
Strips of buri palm woven into a hexagonal kinab-anan pattern

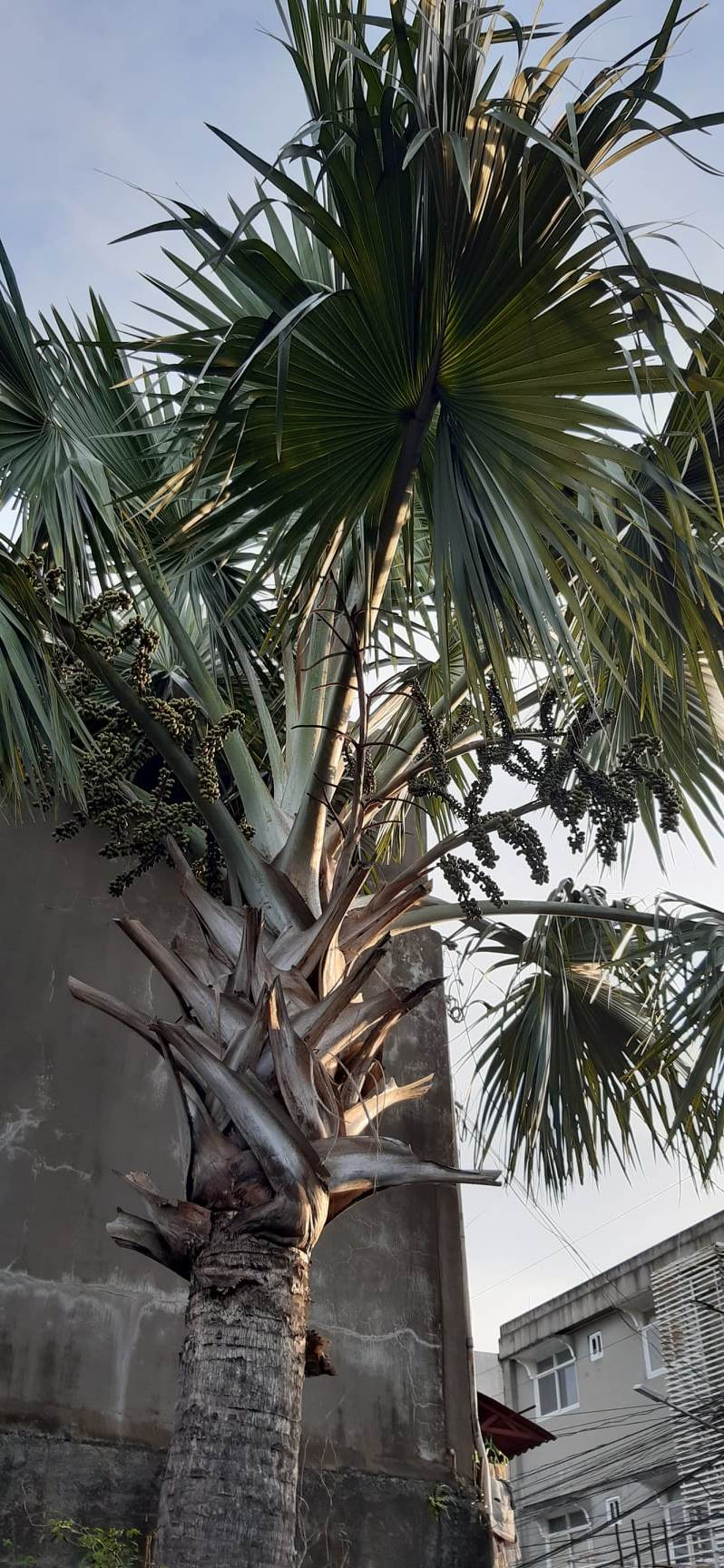
Buri palm with fruits

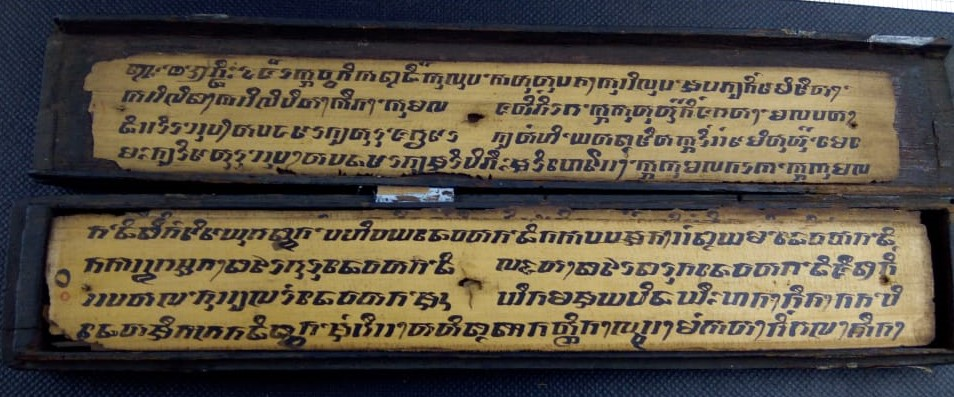
Old Sundanese gebang manuscript, Sanghyang Raga Dewata, from Museum Sri Baduga collection in West Java, Indonesia

== Uses ==
In the Philippines, buri trees, like the sago palm, are used as sources of starch made into starch balls called landang. These are traditionally cooked into various desserts and dishes, most notably the binignit.

The leaves are often used for thatching or can be woven into baskets, etc. Three kinds of fibres, namely buri (unopened leaf fibers), raffia (mature leaf fibers), and buntal (leaf petiole fiber), may be obtained from the plant. The midrib of the leaves are also used for weaving hats in the Philippines known as calasiao hats. The Buntal Hat Festival is celebrated in Baliuag, Bulacan yearly every 6th of May.
