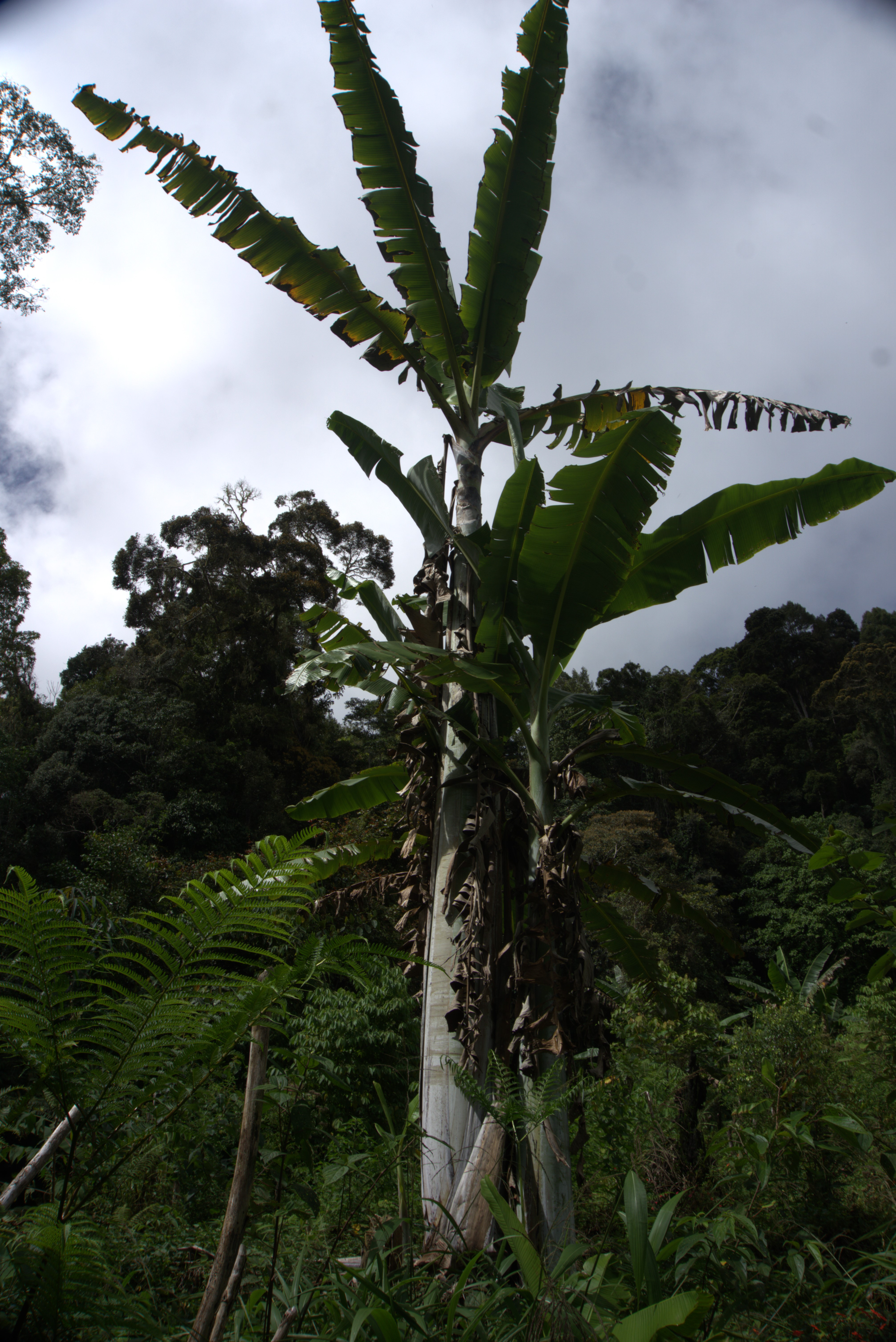

Conservation status
- Least Concern (IUCN 3.1)

Scientific classification
- Kingdom: Plantae
- Clade: Embryophytes
- Clade: Tracheophytes
- Clade: Spermatophytes
- Clade: Angiosperms
- Clade: Monocots
- Clade: Commelinids
- Order: Zingiberales
- Family: Musaceae
- Genus: Musa
- Species: M. ingens

Binomial name
- Musa ingens N. W. Simmonds

= Musa ingens =

Species of flowering plant

The plant species Musa ingens, also known as the giant highland banana or Oem, is the physically largest member of the family Musaceae and the only member of the section Ingentimusa. Growing in the tropical montane forests of New Guinea - Arfak Mountains Regency in Indonesia, its leaves can reach a length of 5 m (16 ft) and a width of 1 m (39 in). This, the largest herbaceous plant on earth, was completely unknown to science prior to 1960.

== Description ==
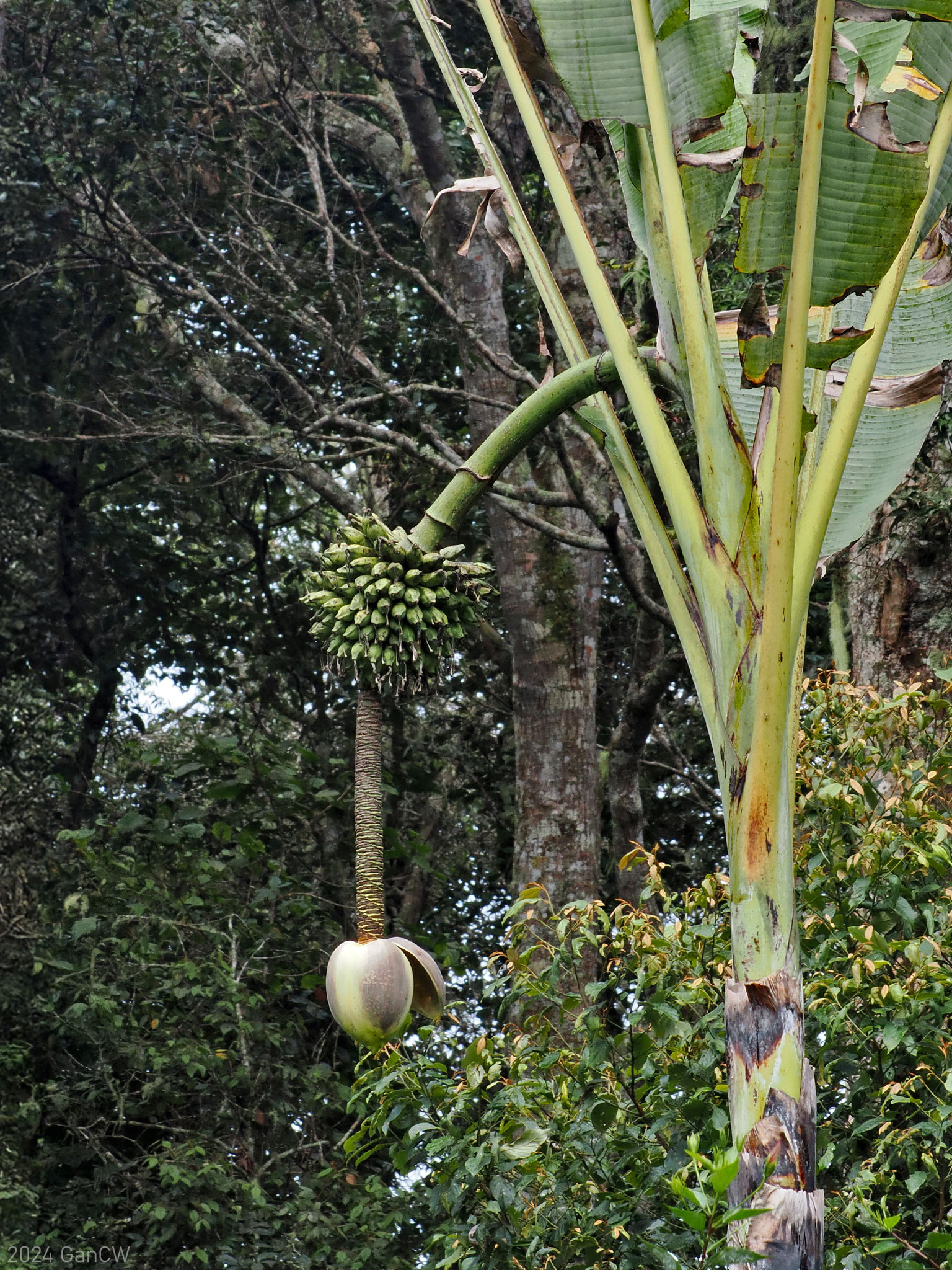
Fruit and inflorescence of Musa ingens

The "trunk" (actually the tightly rolled petioles (or stalks) of its leaves; the longest petioles of any known plant) is typically up to 15 m (49 ft) in height, and with the leaves having a total height of 20 m (66 ft). Since its discovery in 1954, though, taller individuals up to 30 m (98 ft) have been reported, but these measurements have yet to be verified by accurate measuring methods. Photos exist of M. ingens "trunks" up to 94 cm (37 in) in diameter at breast height. Its fruit grows in a cluster weighing up to 60 kg (130 lb) consisting of about twenty "hands" (cymes) of 16 to 20 fruit each. The cluster is borne on a peduncle up to 10 cm (4 in) thick and up to 15 m (49 ft) in length, again the longest of any known plant. The large inflorescence can hold over 300 oblong fruit, 18 cm (7 in) long, that are filled with blackish-brown seeds and yellowish pulp that is edible, sweet, and delicious when cooked, and according to some, reminiscent of fine butternut squash mixed with a sweet banana with a dash of tangy lime and citrus added.
