= Buntal hat =

Traditional straw hat from the Philippines

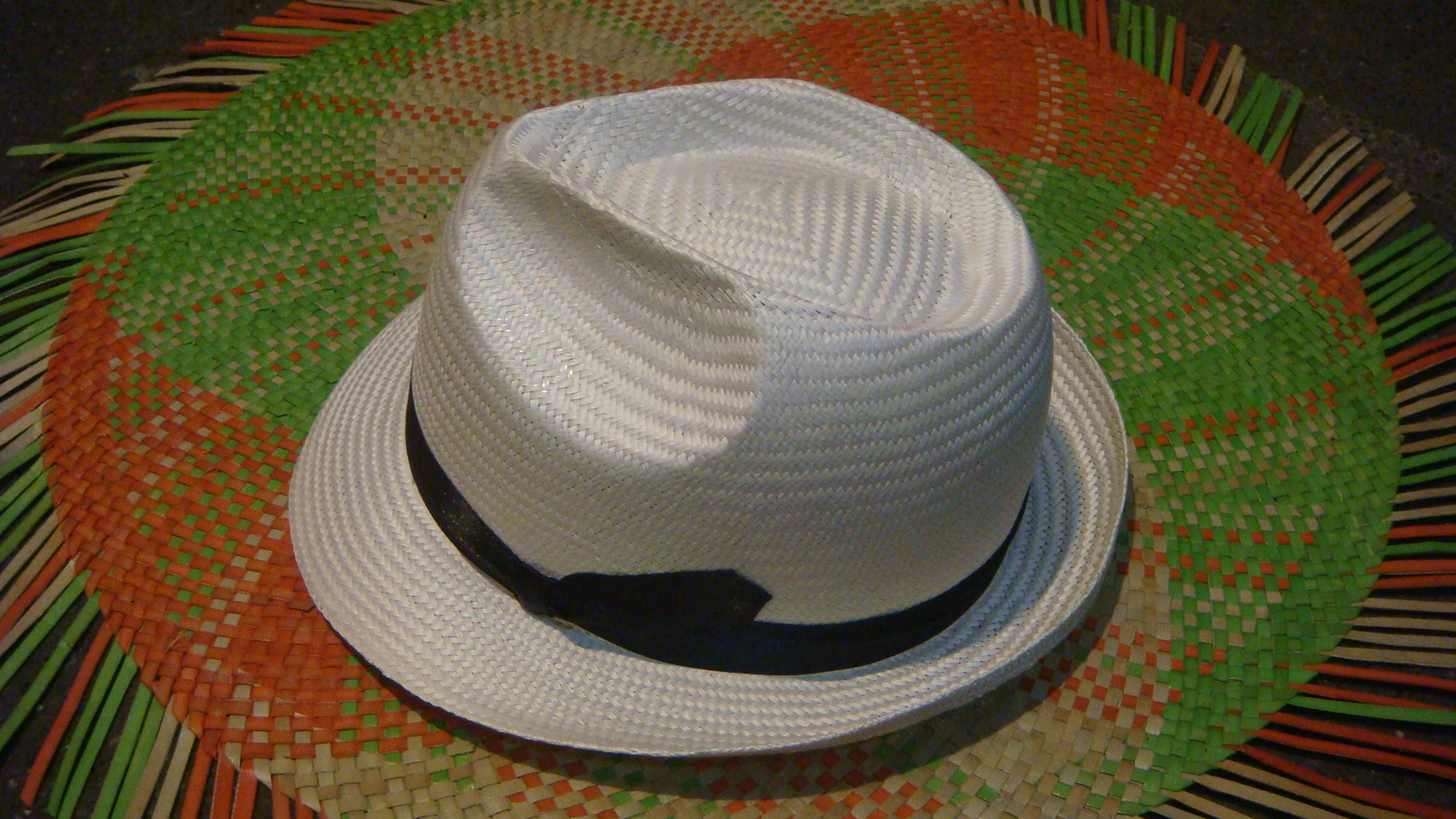
A buntal hat from Baliwag

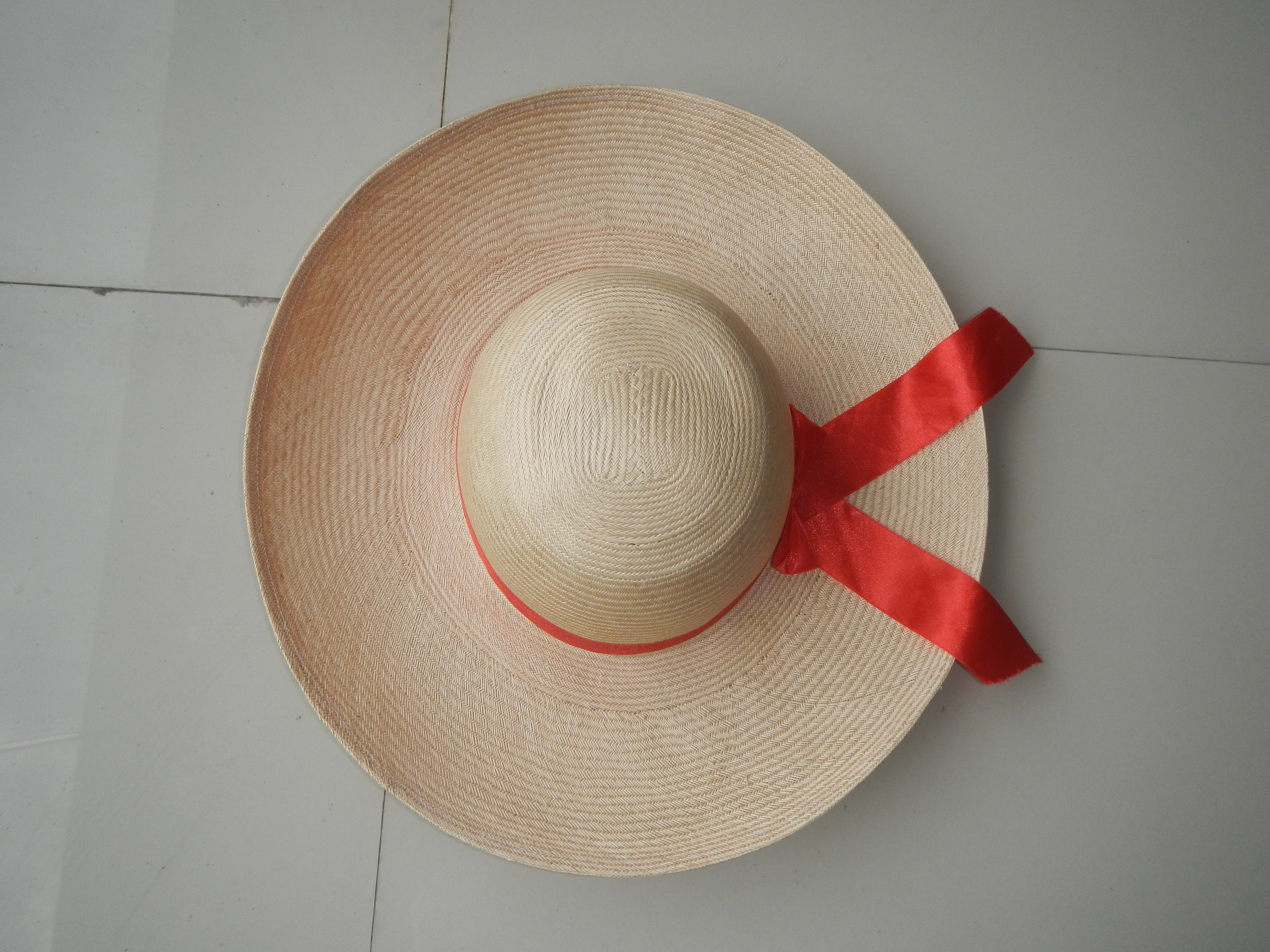
A wide-brimmed woman's baliwag hat from Baliwag

The buntal hat is a traditional lightweight straw hat from the Philippines made from very finely-woven fibers extracted from the petioles of buri palm leaves. It is traditionally worn by farmers working in the fields and was a major export of the Philippines in the first half of the 20th century. It can also be paired with semi-formal barong tagalog as well as informal attire. Its main centers of production are Baliwag, Bulacan, and (historically) Sariaya and Tayabas in Quezon Province. Buntal hats produced in Baliwag are also sometimes known as balibuntal hats (a portmanteau of "Baliwag" and "buntal"), and are regarded as superior in quality to other types of buntal hats.

Buntal hats were traditionally woven into wide-brimmed farmer's hats for the domestic market. Later versions of the hat using softened fibers and a finer weave are woven into a form resembling the fedora, and it is often mistaken for and sold as the very similar Panama hat or under the misleading name Bangkok hat. These versions are characterized by being durable, yet light, and with a silkier texture than Panama hats. It can also be woven into other forms, including as women's braided wide-brimmed sun hats known as the baliwag hat (also named after the town of Baliwag). Buntal hats are also sometimes known as the parabuntal hat (cf. parasisal), balihat, East Indian Panama hat, or Italian straw hat.

The term "balibuntal" (sometimes spelled "ballibuntl" or "ballibuntal") has also come to refer to the fine, glossy, and lightweight straw made from buri palm fibers, which has come to be used in other woven products aside from millinery.

== Production ==
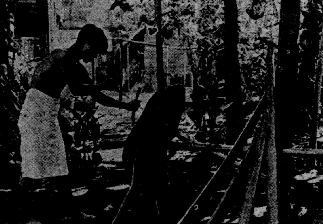
Worker pulling out buntal fibers manually from the buri palm petiole (c.1912)

Buntal hats are manufactured from buntal fiber extracted from buri palms (Corypha spp.). Most buntal fibers are sourced from the buri plantations of Quezon Province. Traditionally, it is extracted from seven to ten-year old buri palms. Three to six leaf stems (at least 6 ft (1.8 m) in length) are cut from a tree twice each year. The base of the stem is skinned and the exposed fiber beaten with a bolo blade until they are separated into bundles. The name of the fiber comes from this process (buntal is Tagalog for "to strike" or "to beat"). The top part of the stem is also skinned. The entire stem is then tied to a post for support. Bundles of exposed fiber are selected from the beaten part and then manually pulled out of the stem. Each pulling can yield 1 to 5 fibers, and each stem can yield four to six bundles of fibers (known as meresa), depending on the condition of the stem and the dexterity of the worker. Modern buntal fibers however, can also be extracted via the easier method of retting.

== History ==
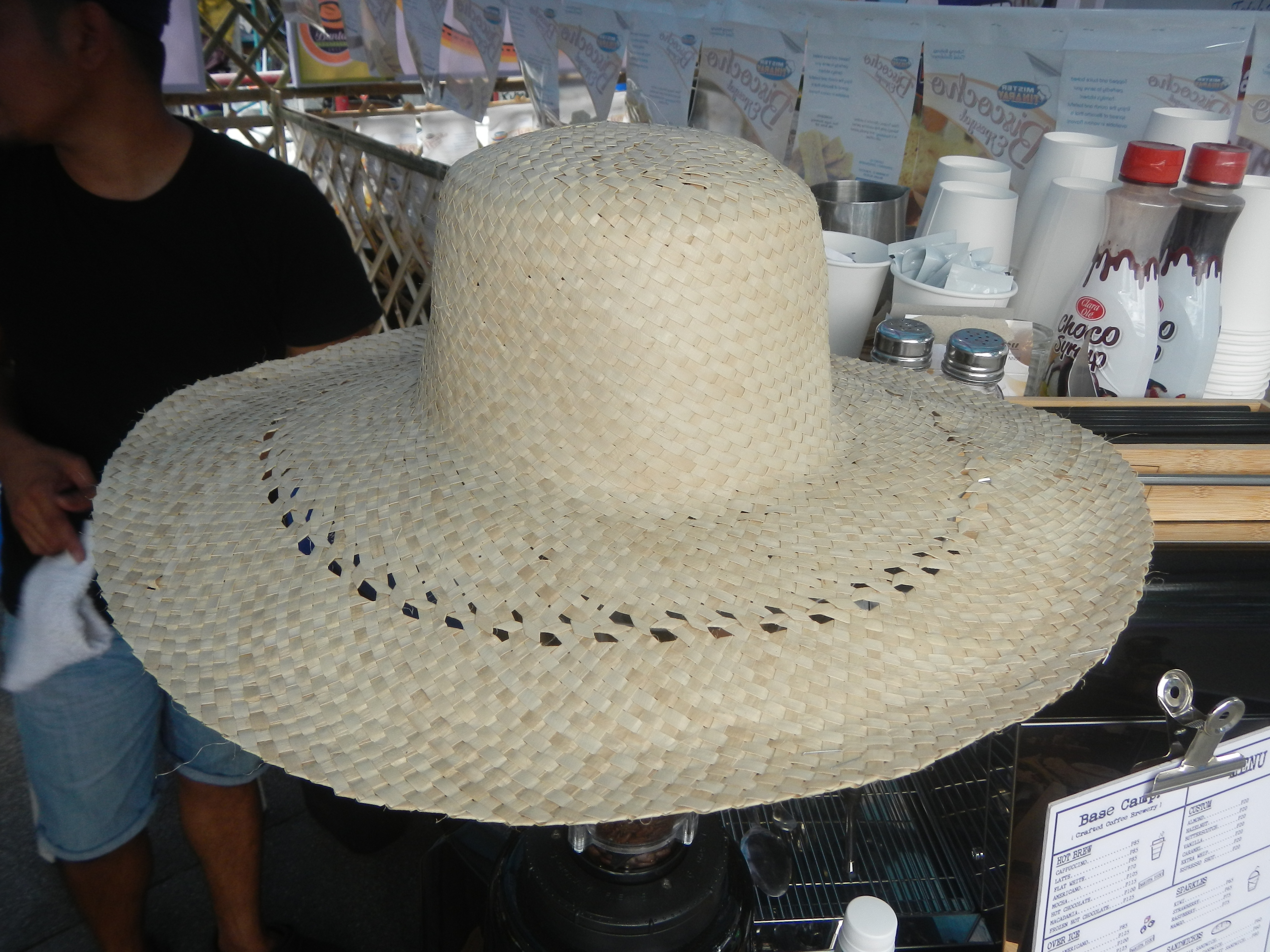
Payabyab, the precursor to buntal hats. A type of wide-brimmed farmer's hat made from unsoftened buri palm fibers.

Originally, buntal hats were primarily produced in the towns of Sariaya and Tayabas, due to the buri palm plantations in Quezon Province. Early versions of the buntal hat were wide-brimmed farmer's hats (payabyab) and used unsoftened strips of buntal fiber. The industry expanded into Baliuag, Bulacan, between 1907 and 1909, originally introduced by Mariano Deveza who originally hailed from Lucban, Quezon. Introducing buntal hat weaving to Baliuag was easy since the town already had a preexisting weaving industry producing textiles, pañuelos (kerchiefs), tapis, as well as woven hats made from bamboo straw. Buntal hat production in Baliuag was further enhanced by Dolores Maniquis who softened the fibers through the use of a wooden roller known as an iluhan. This process was meticulous as using the roller too many times can result in the fibers becoming too brittle. This resulted in buntal fibers that could be woven into hats with a finer weave and texture.

By 1910, buntal hat production was a cottage industry in Baliuag. Several people often specialized on different parts of the hat and work together in an assembly process. However, there were no factories per se. Instead, the hats are woven by various households in rural areas who then supplied the merchants. The weavers were exclusively women, usually housewives. The industry was so large that there was at least one weaver for every household.

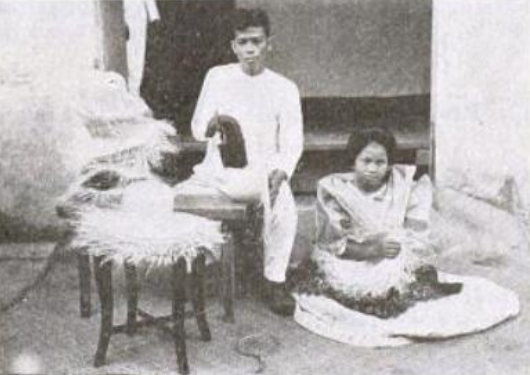
Woman weaving buntal hats while a man is using a charcoal iron to shape finished hats (c.1929)

By 1920s, the hats were being exported by the Philippines, often passed off as the very similar Panama hat or under the name "Bangkok hat". However, in 1923, Chinese producers from Hong Kong hired hat weavers from the Philippines. Having acquired the weaving process, they then began to mass-produce balibuntal hats using buntal fibers imported from the Philippines. This affected the local industry to such an extent that Representative Antonio Villarama tried to pass a bill to ban the export of buntal fiber (though it failed).

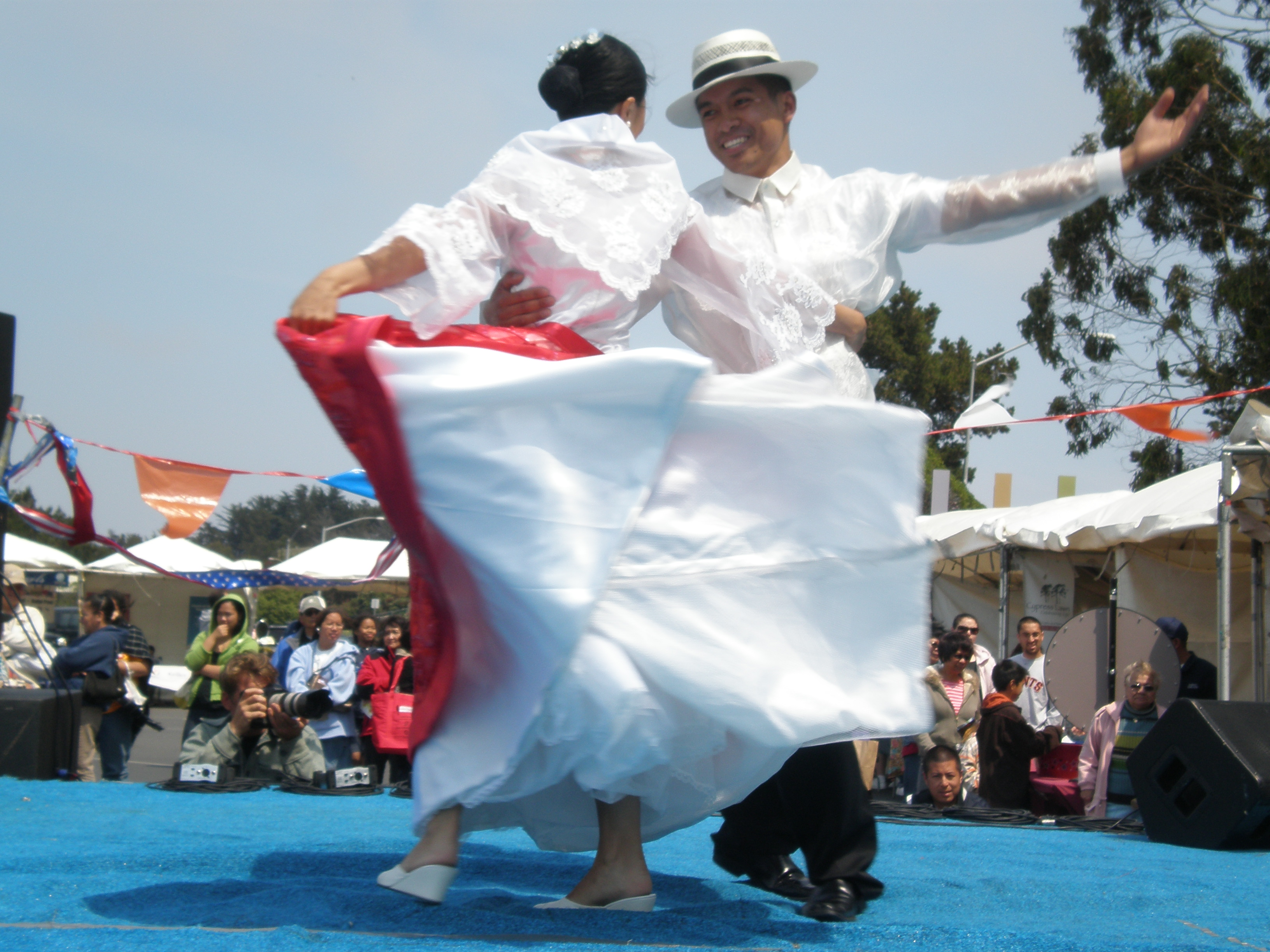
Dancers performing Jota Cagayana in Daly City, California. The man is wearing a white barong tagalog with a buntal hat, while the woman is in a traje de mestiza

Because of competition from Chinese factories, the buntal hat industry waned until the 1960s when it was again revived by the Villones family from Sariaya, Quezon. Their hats were mostly sourced from suppliers from Baliuag, although they also bought hats from nearby towns in Bulacan, Pampanga, and Nueva Ecija. Their hats were primarily exported to the United States, Mexico, and Italy. The family accounted for around a quarter of the total monthly production of buntal hats in the 1960s.

The industry, however, is once again in danger of extinction due to the growing lack of skilled workers and the declining demand. Most remaining weavers of buntal are elderly. The government of Baliuag has been taking measures to promote buntal hats to the local market.

In 2011, Rosario Quizon-Bautista, one of the last remaining weavers in Baliuag, also started a project to teach buntal weaving skills to inmates in the Bulacan Provincial Jail, due to the lack of interest among youths in Bulacan. She sells raw buntal fiber to the inmates, and buy back finished hats. This provides them with income while also preserving buntal weaving traditions.

== In popular culture ==
Baliwag celebrates a 10-day "Buntal Festival" every May each year.

== Similar hats ==
Buntal hats can be mistaken for similar Philippine hats also made from the buri palm, the buri hat and the calasiao hat. These differ from the buntal hat in that they are made from different parts of the palm. Buri hats are made from unopened buri palm leaves, while calasiao hats are made from the midribs of the unopened leaves. Similar hats are also traditionally made in the Philippines from other materials, the most common are bamboo hats made from bamboo straw, and the sabutan hat, made from pandan leaves.

== Gallery ==
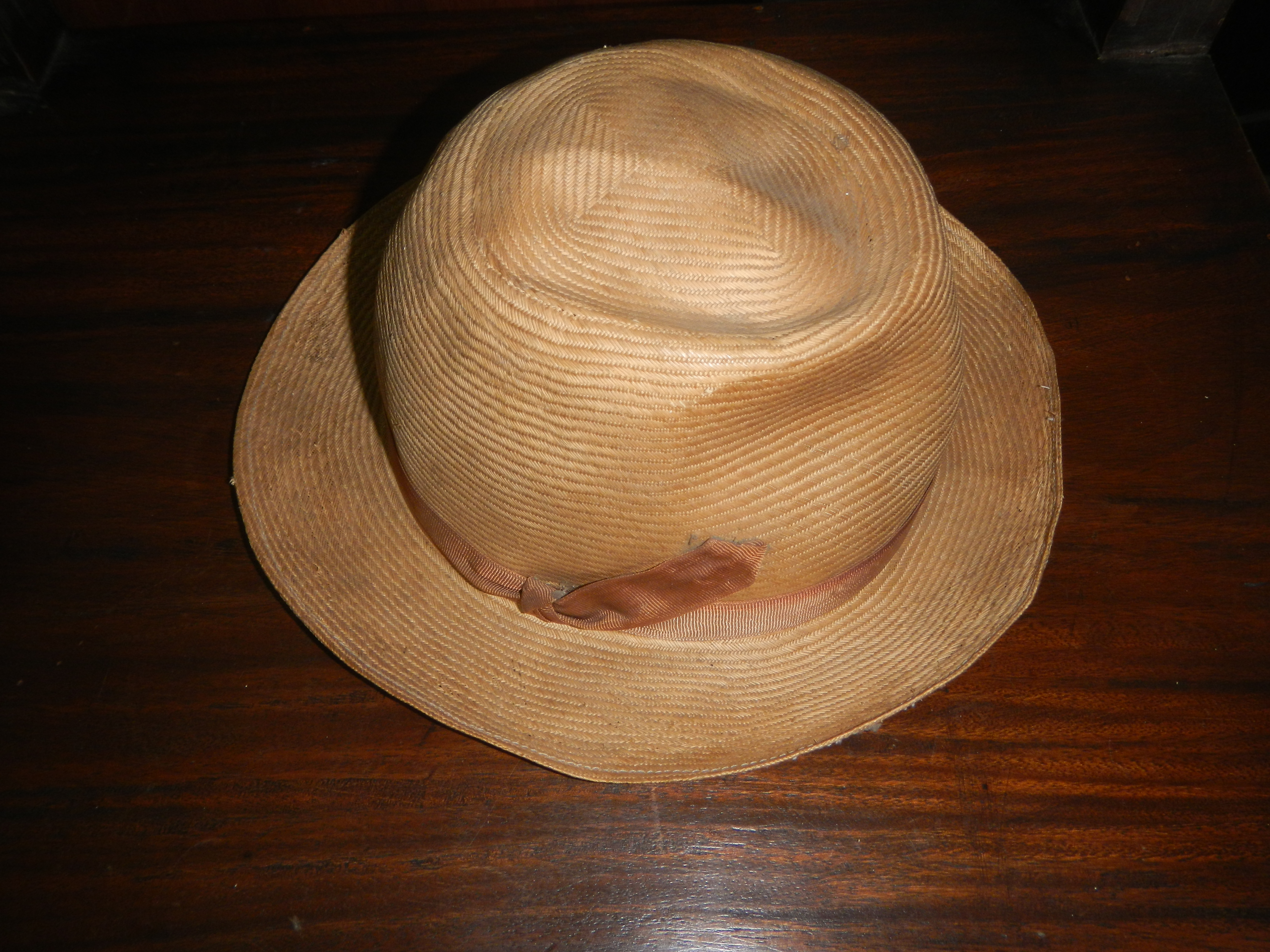
Buntal hat from the Baliuag Museum and Library

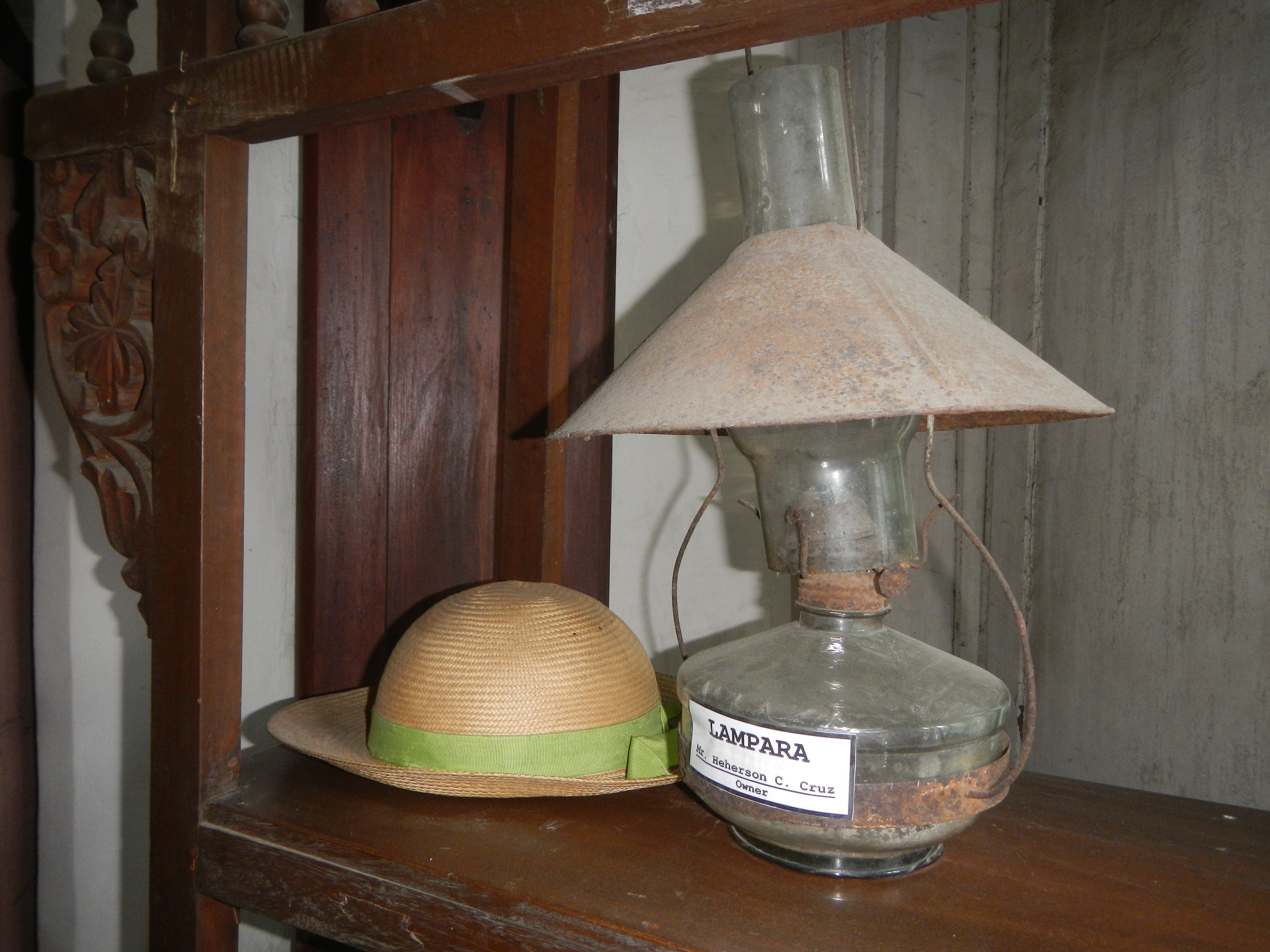
Buntal hat with a round crown from the Baliuag Museum and Library

== See also ==
- List of hat styles
- Salakot
- Barong tagalog
- Baro't saya
