= Folk costume =

Traditional clothing usually associated with a geographic area

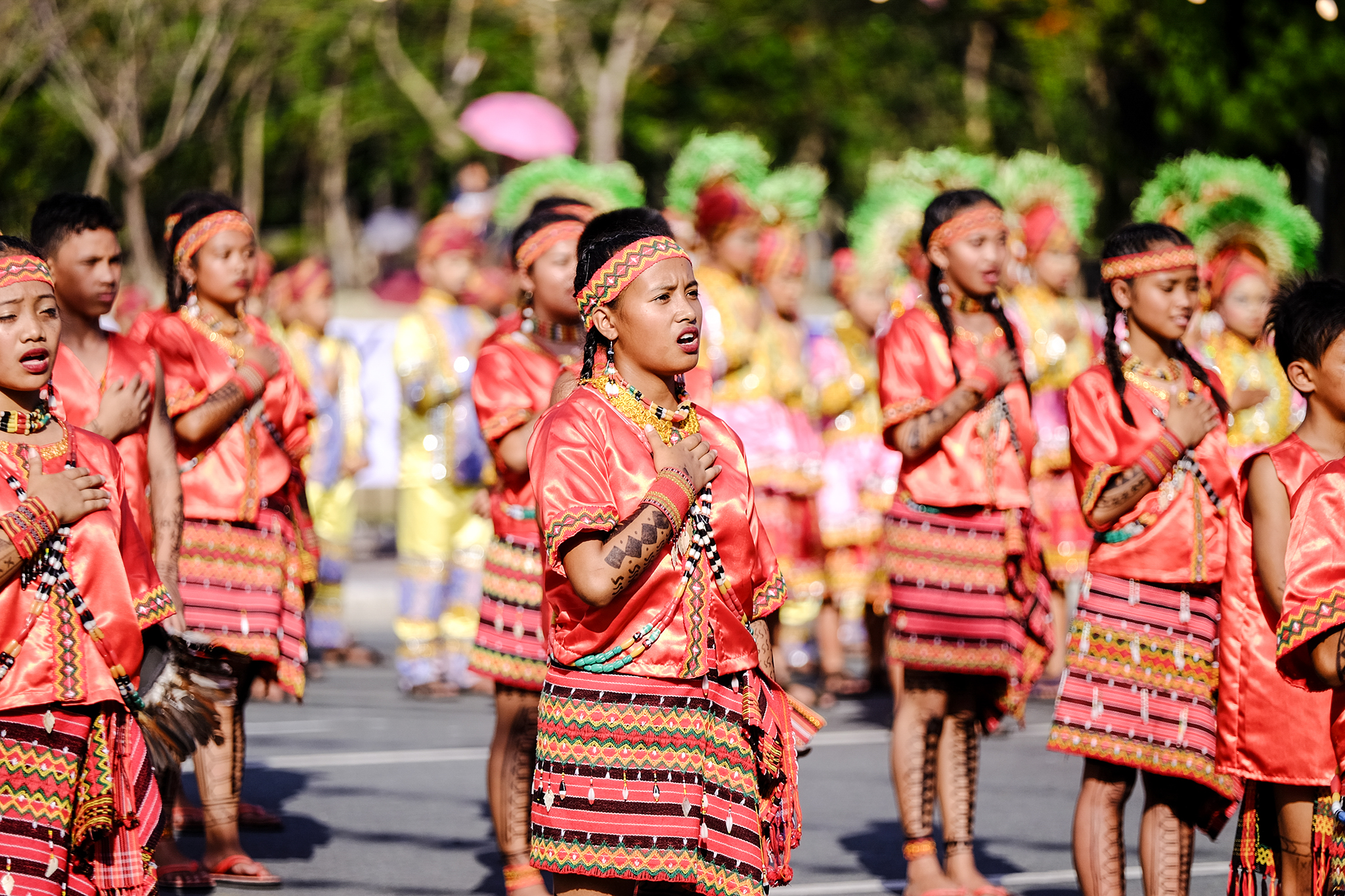
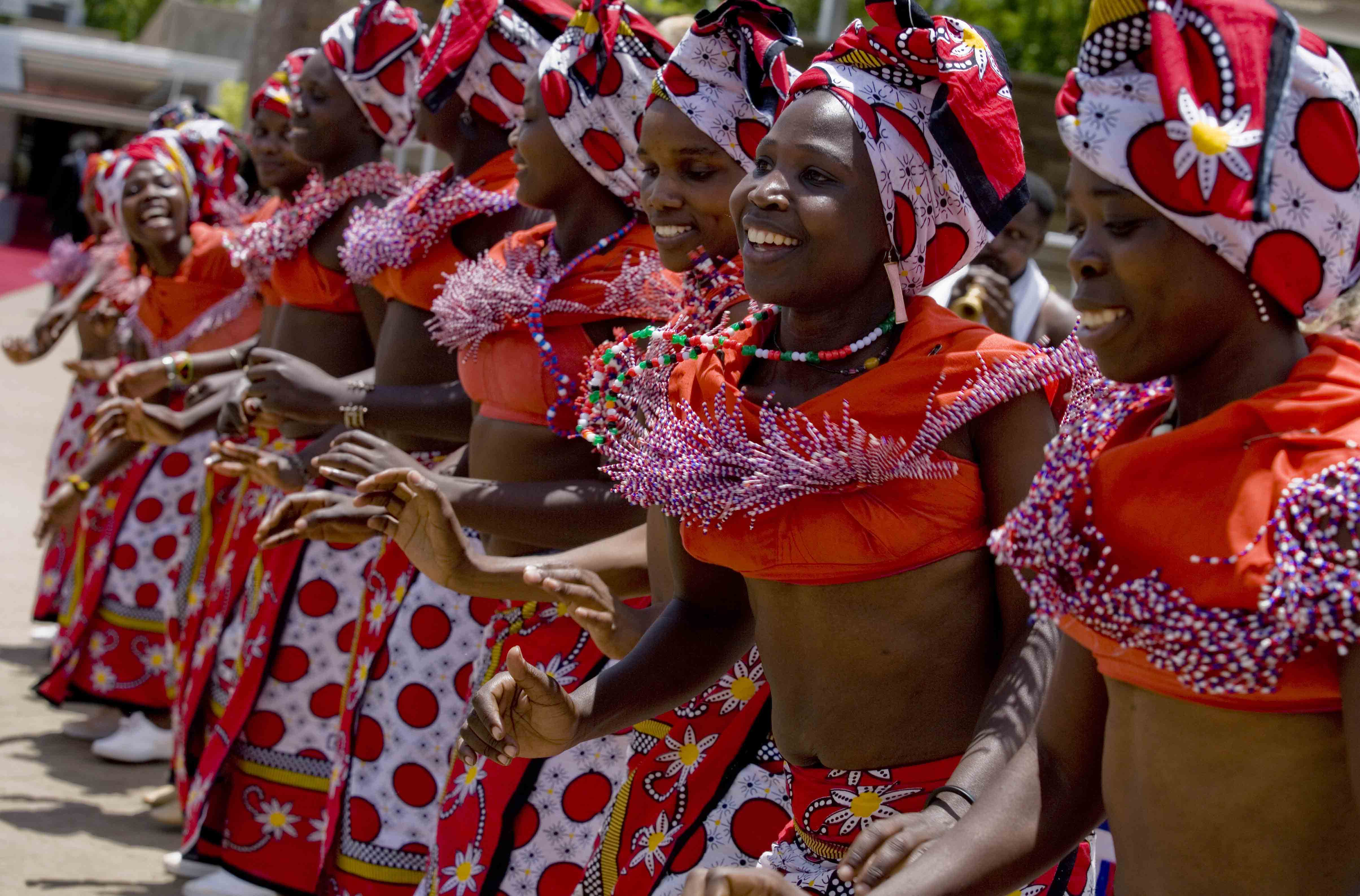
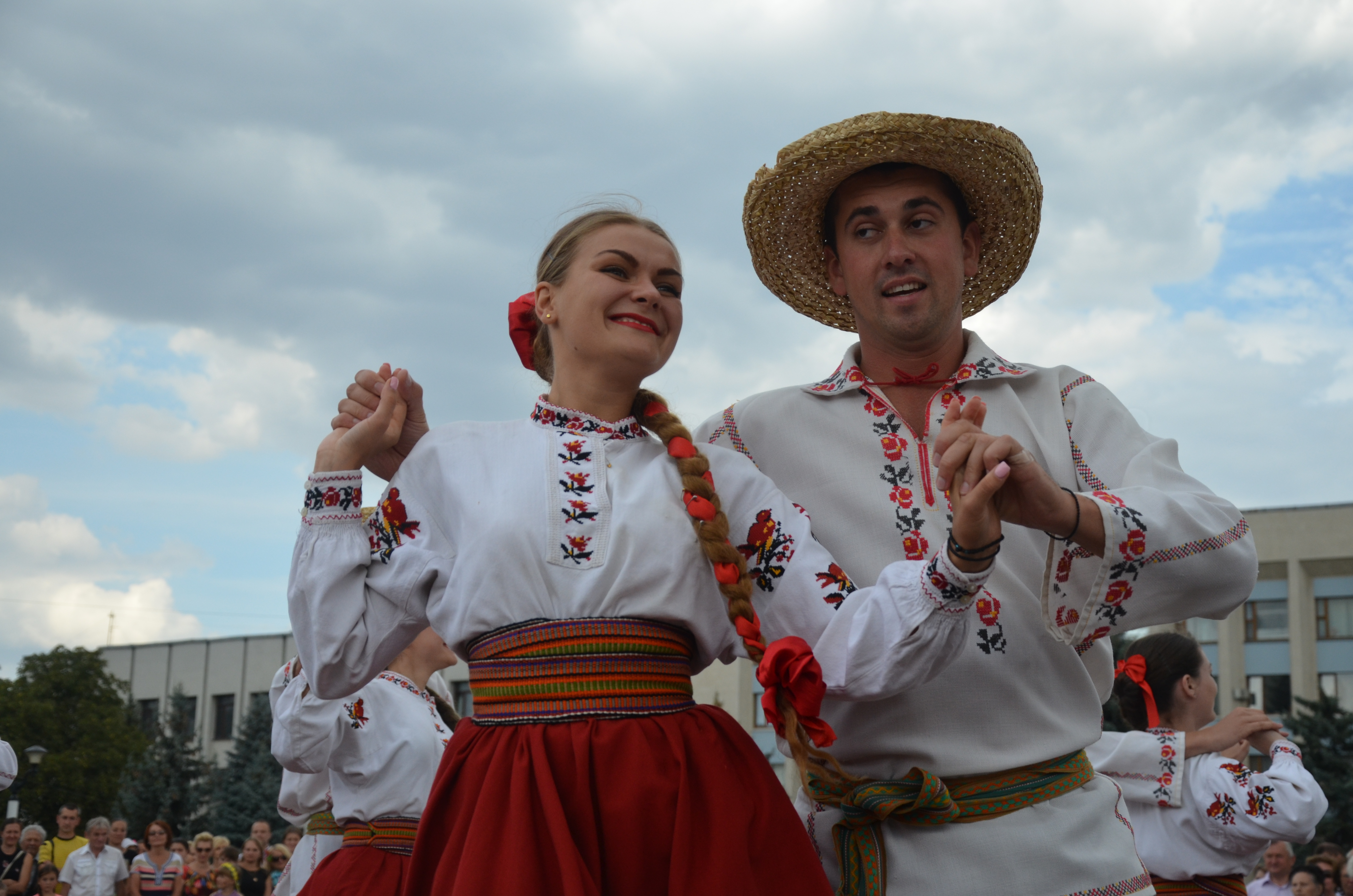
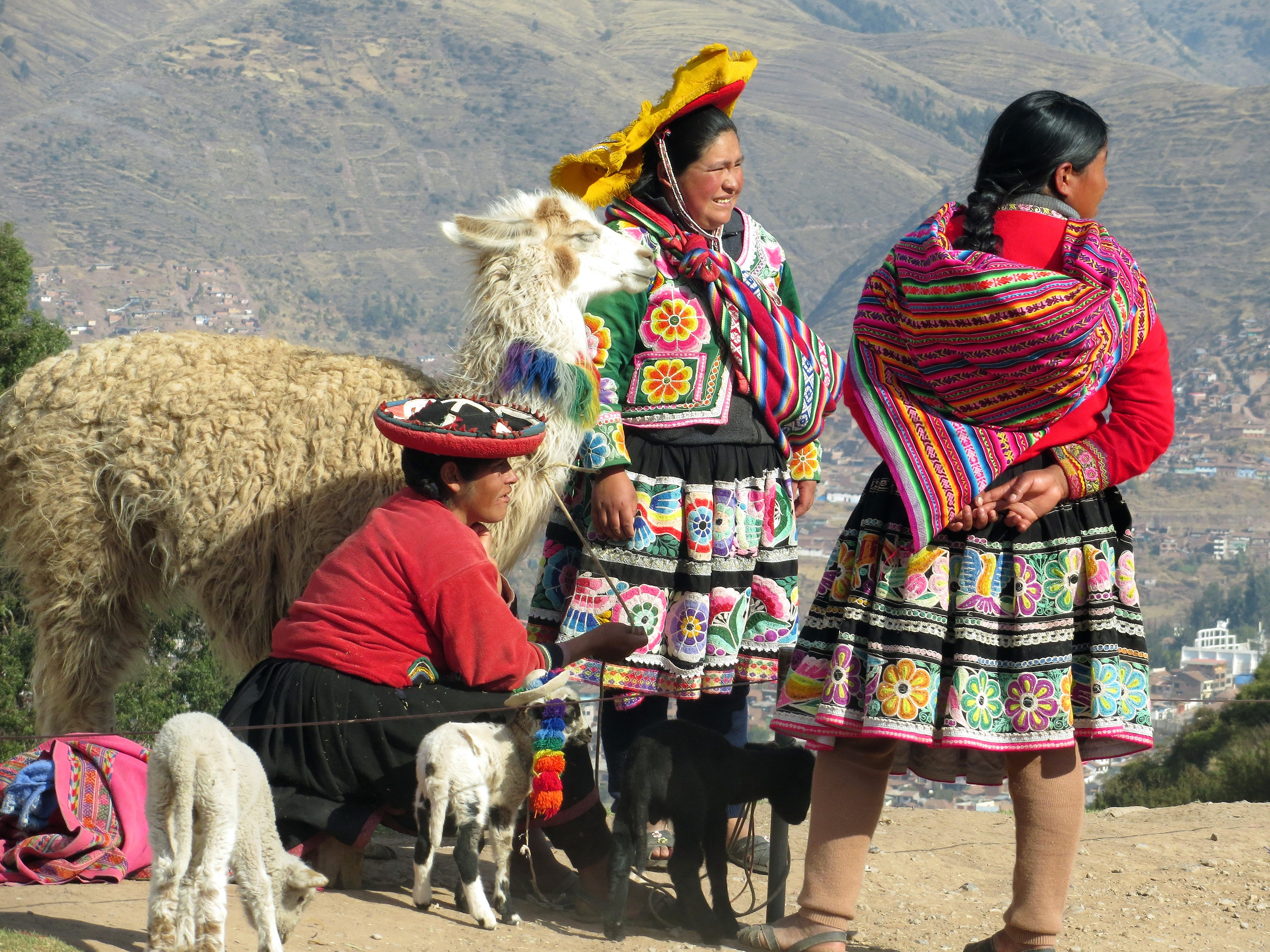
From top, left to right: Filipinos (Igorot), Kenyans, Ukrainians and Peruvians dressed in traditional garments

Traditional dress, also known as folk attire, traditional attire, and in the past also as folk costume, is the clothing of an ethnic group, nation or region, and expresses cultural, religious or national identity. It includes both everyday and formal wear, including those which do not cater to Western dress codes.

A specific ethnic group's clothing may be called ethnic clothing or ethnic dress. Those attributed to a certain place are often called national costume or regional costume; these may have official designation.

== Overview ==
Following the rise of romantic nationalism in parts of Europe, pre-industrial peasantry came to serve as an ideal of authenticity. Garments evoking peasant dress were made from traditional pre-industrial textiles.

In regions where Western dress codes are common, traditional garments are often worn during special events or celebrations. International events may cater to non-Western attendees with a compound dress code such as "business suit or national dress".

In some contemporary societies, traditional garments are required by sumptuary laws.

== Africa ==
=== North Africa ===
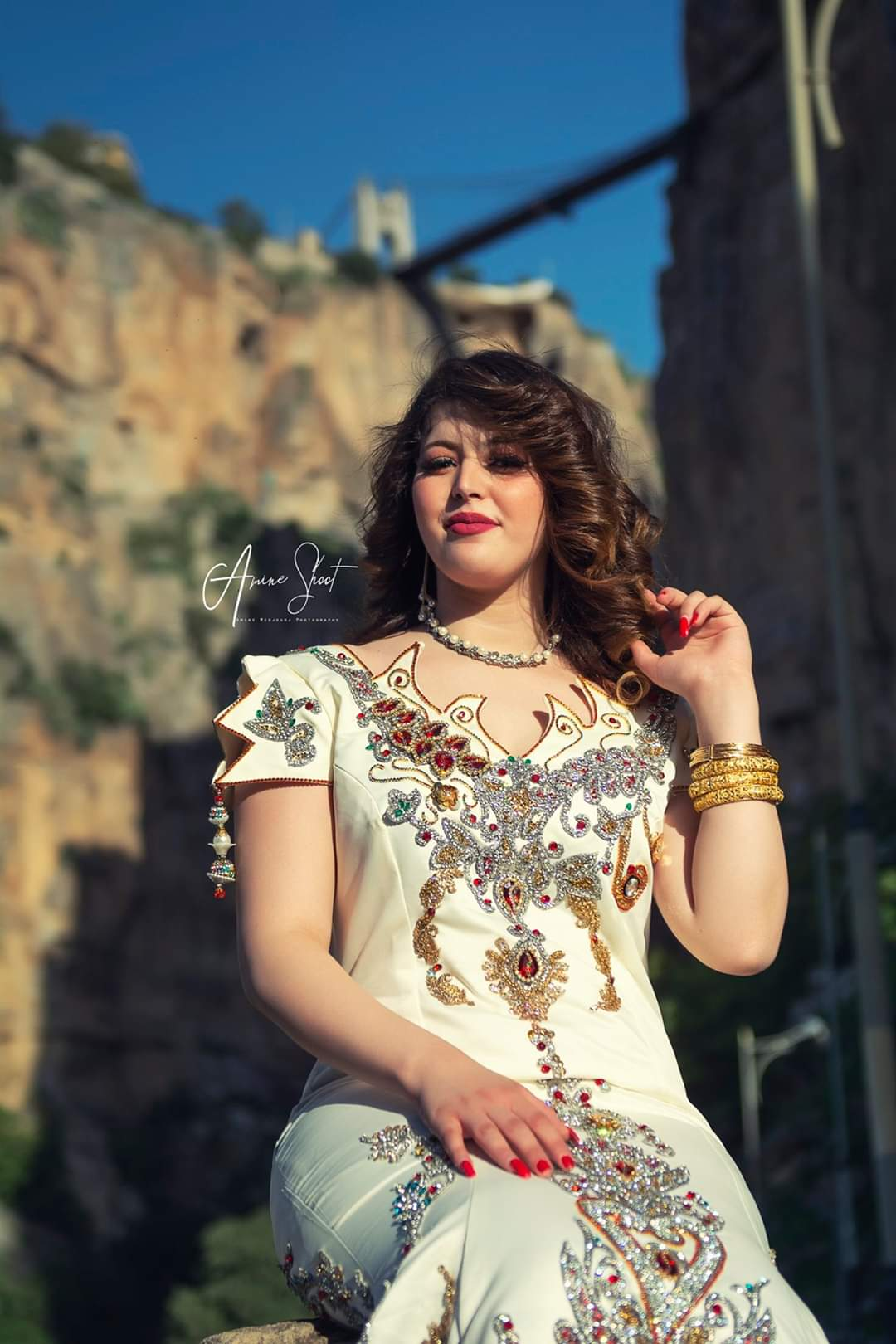
Traditional gandoura, also called djebba fergani, from Algeria

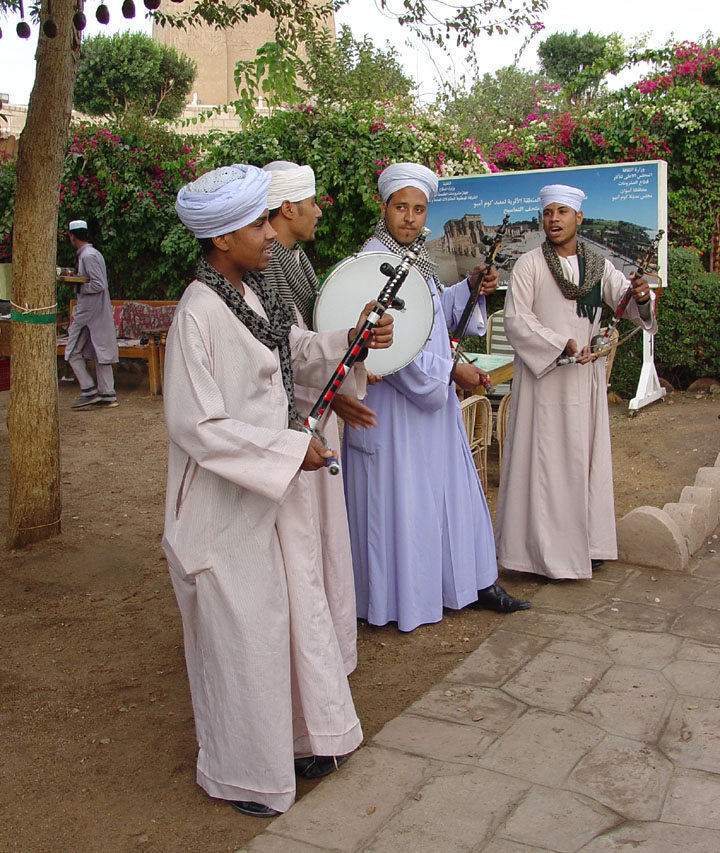
Egyptian musicians wearing jellabiya

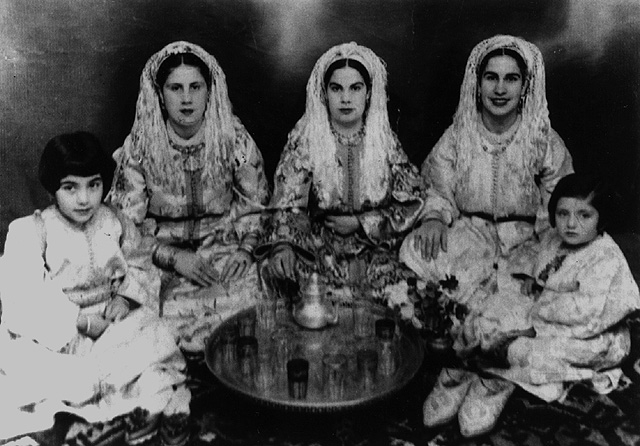
Moroccan women wearing takshita in 1939

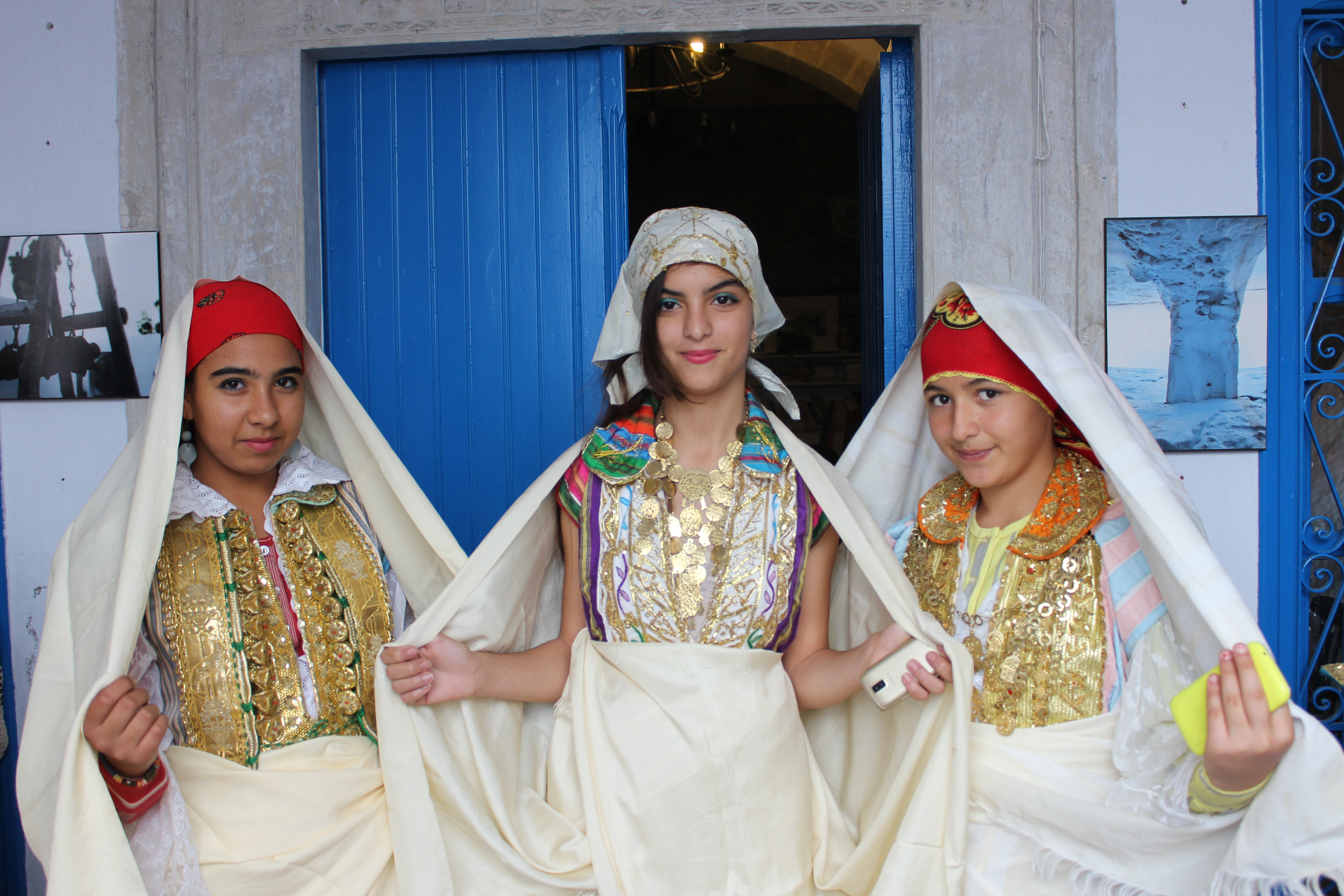
Traditional Tunisian clothing, including safasir

==== Algeria ====
In Algeria, cultural dress includes the burnous, ghlila, caftan, gandoura, haik, jellaba, m'laya, and sarouel. In northern Algeria, clothing includes the karakou (in Algiers), labsa Naïlia (among Ouled Naïl), and labsa M'zabia (among Mozabite people). In northeastern Algeria, dress includes Gandoura Annabiya (in Annaba), qashabiya and melhfa chaouïa (among Chaoui people), labsa Kbaylia (among Kabyle people), and binouar Staifi (in Sétif). In northwestern Algeria, traditional dress includes the blouza in Oran and the chedda of Tlemcen. In southern Algeria, the tagelmust is traditional attire; traditional clothing of the Tuareg people includes the akhebay. In Western Algeria, Sahrawis wear the el-melhfa Sahraoui.

=== Egypt ===
Egypt has one of the most varied folk-costume traditions in North Africa, shaped by the country's different landscapes, communities, and cultural heritage. Rather than having a single national costume, Egyptian dress changes noticeably from the Nile Delta to Upper Egypt, Nubia, the Sinai Peninsula, the Western Desert, and the Red Sea coast. For men, the galabeya is the most recognizable traditional garment, a long and loose robe often accompanied by a shawl, vest, turban, or other head covering. In Nubia, men traditionally wear white galabeyas with shawls and turbans, while women are known for colorful dresses, embroidered garments, the gergar, and distinctive jewelry. In Upper Egypt, or the Sa'id, women's clothing is often characterized by long dark dresses enriched with embroidery, including telli work associated with Asyut. Among rural fellah communities, clothing was shaped by agricultural life and the warm climate, with loose galabeyas, trousers, dresses, veils, and practical head coverings. In the Nile Delta and along the northern coast, women's traditional dress included embroidered garments and the melaya leff, a large mantle wrapped around the body, while Alexandria developed its own coastal styles, including forms of the yashmak. Bedouin dress in the Sinai Peninsula is especially striking for its vivid embroidery, decorated belts, shawls, and elaborate face veils, some adorned with rows of silver or gold coins. In the Siwa Oasis and other Western Desert oases, traditional garments are distinguished by intricate embroidery, veils, shawls, and jewelry reflecting the local communities. Along the Red Sea, groups such as the Ababda people, Bishari people, and Rashaida maintain distinctive styles adapted to their environment and cultural traditions. These garments, patterns, ornaments, and ways of wearing dress form a living expression of Egypt's regional identity and cultural heritage.

Egyptian woman in traditional dress

Nubian girls, Egypt

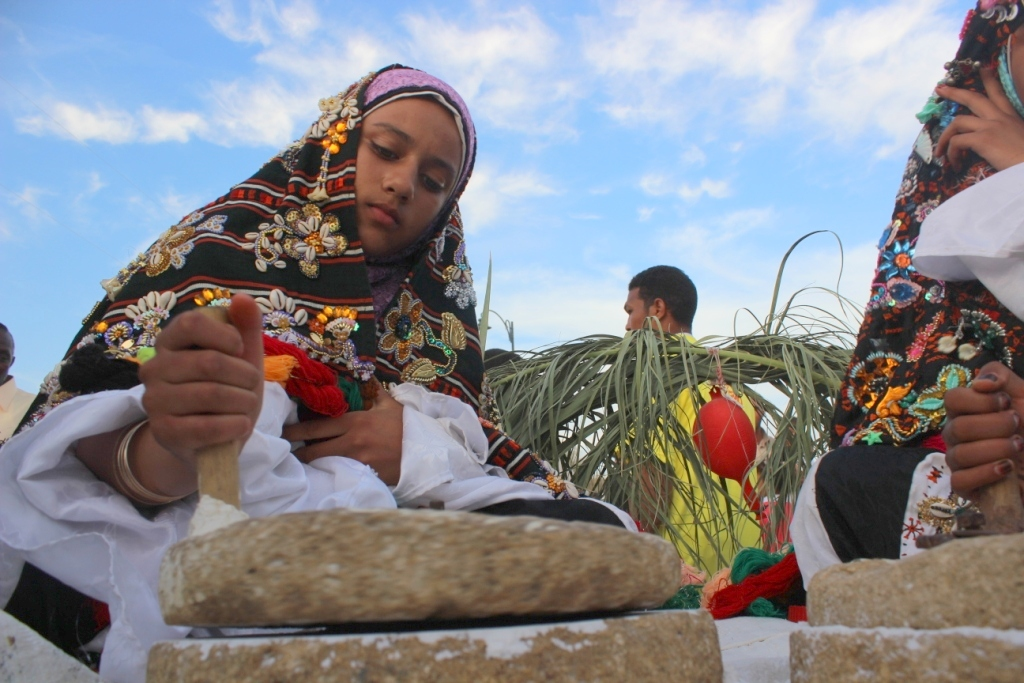
Traditional dress of Siwa Oasis

Fellahin women, Egypt, c. 1880

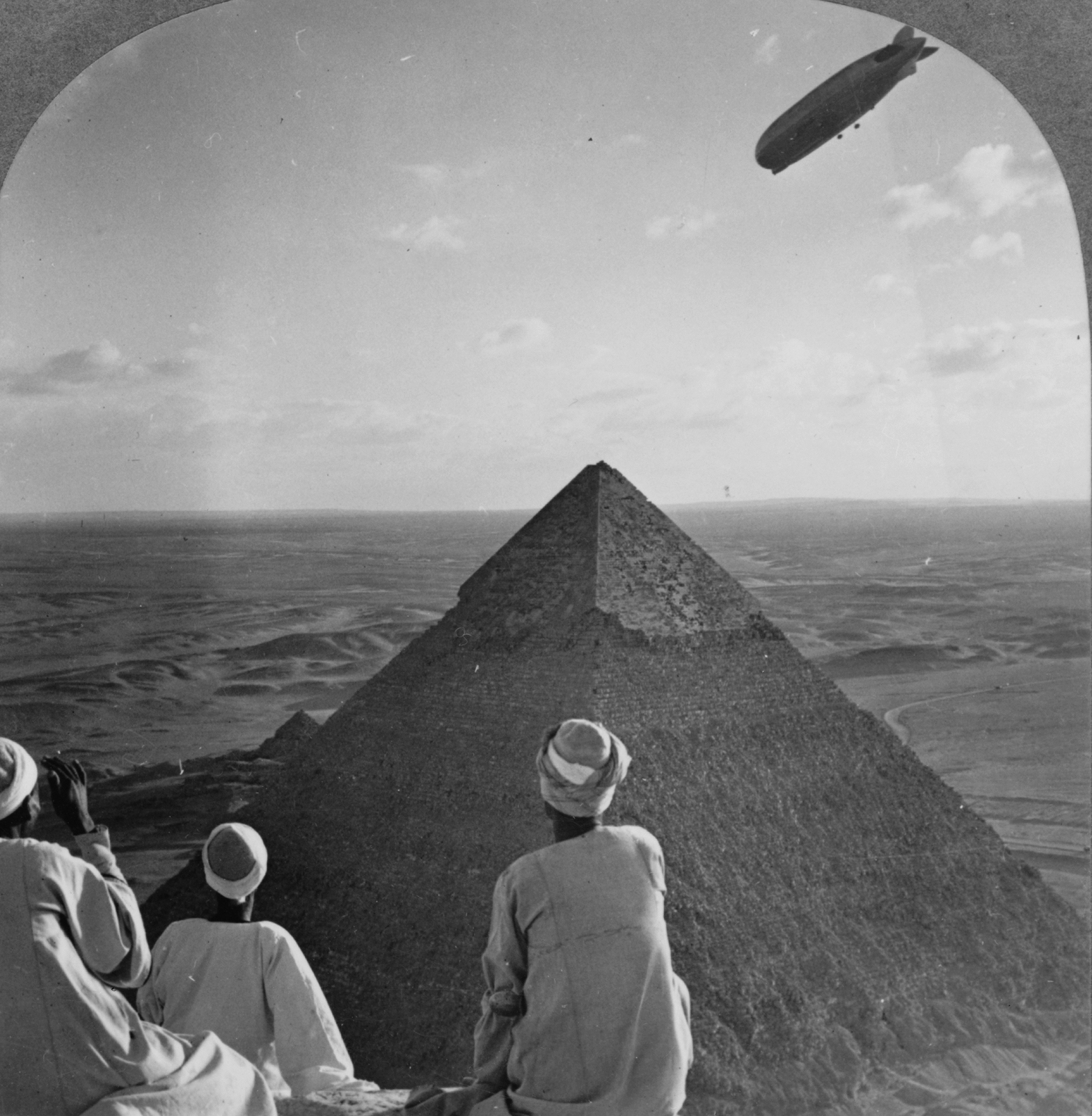
Egyptian men at the Giza pyramids, 1931

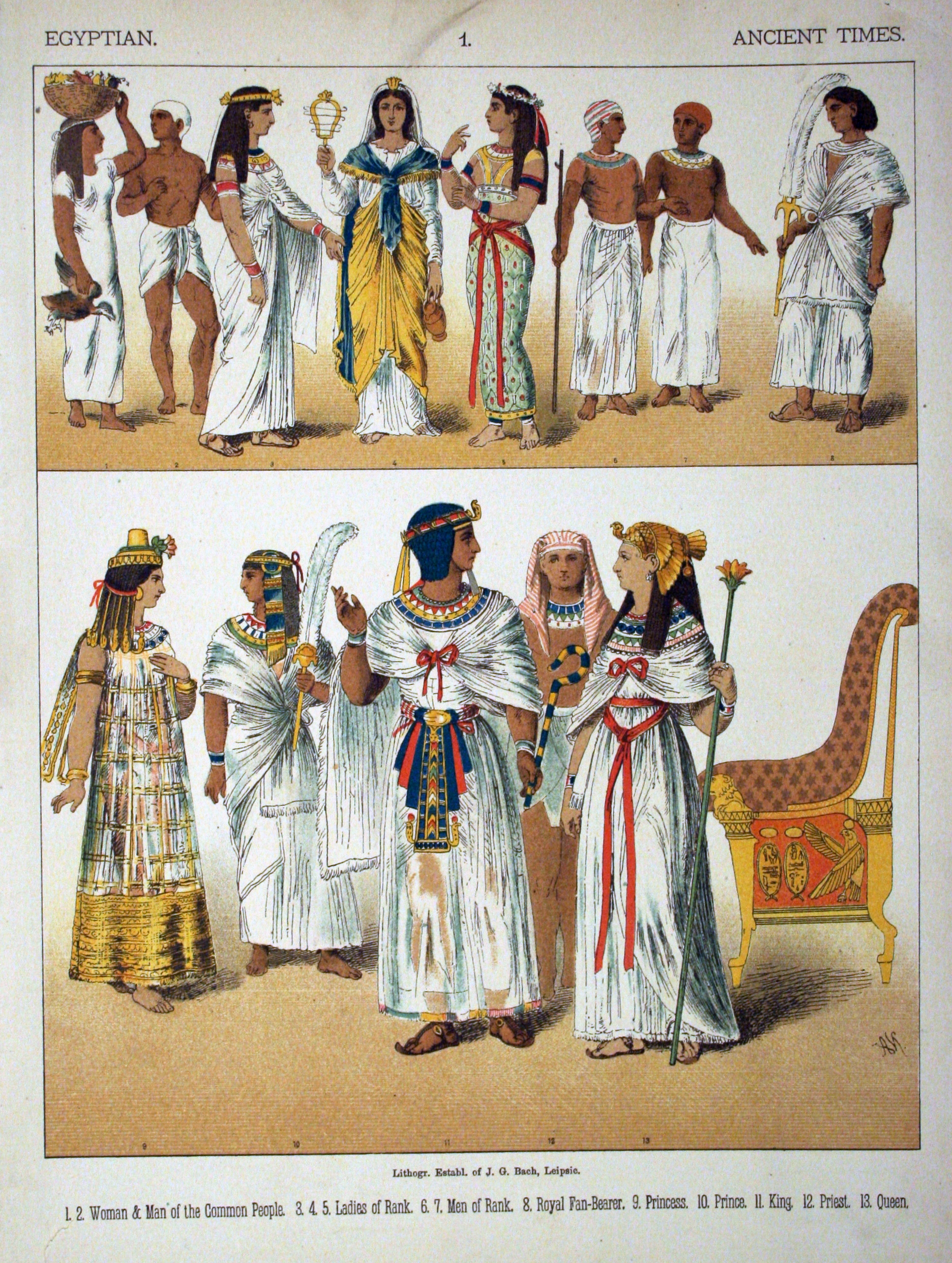
Egyptian costumes, 1882

=== Sub-Saharan Africa ===
Transnational traditional attires in Sub-Saharan Africa include agbada and boubou, and dashiki for men, pagne/pano and kaftan for women.

Xhosa people were umbhaco for both genders. For women, dress includes the faskoti, inxili (sling bag), ncebetha, iqhiya, and ibhayi. For men, it includes the ingqosha, isidanga, and unngqa.

Among Zulu people, traditional clothing includes the isicholo, isidwaba, umutsha, and ibheshu.

For Sotho people, traditional dress includes shweshwe, basotho blankets, and mokorotlo. Afrikaners and Rooineks may wear a slouch hat, safari shirt, veldskoen, knee-high socks, khaki Bermuda shorts or trousers.

==== Specific nations ====
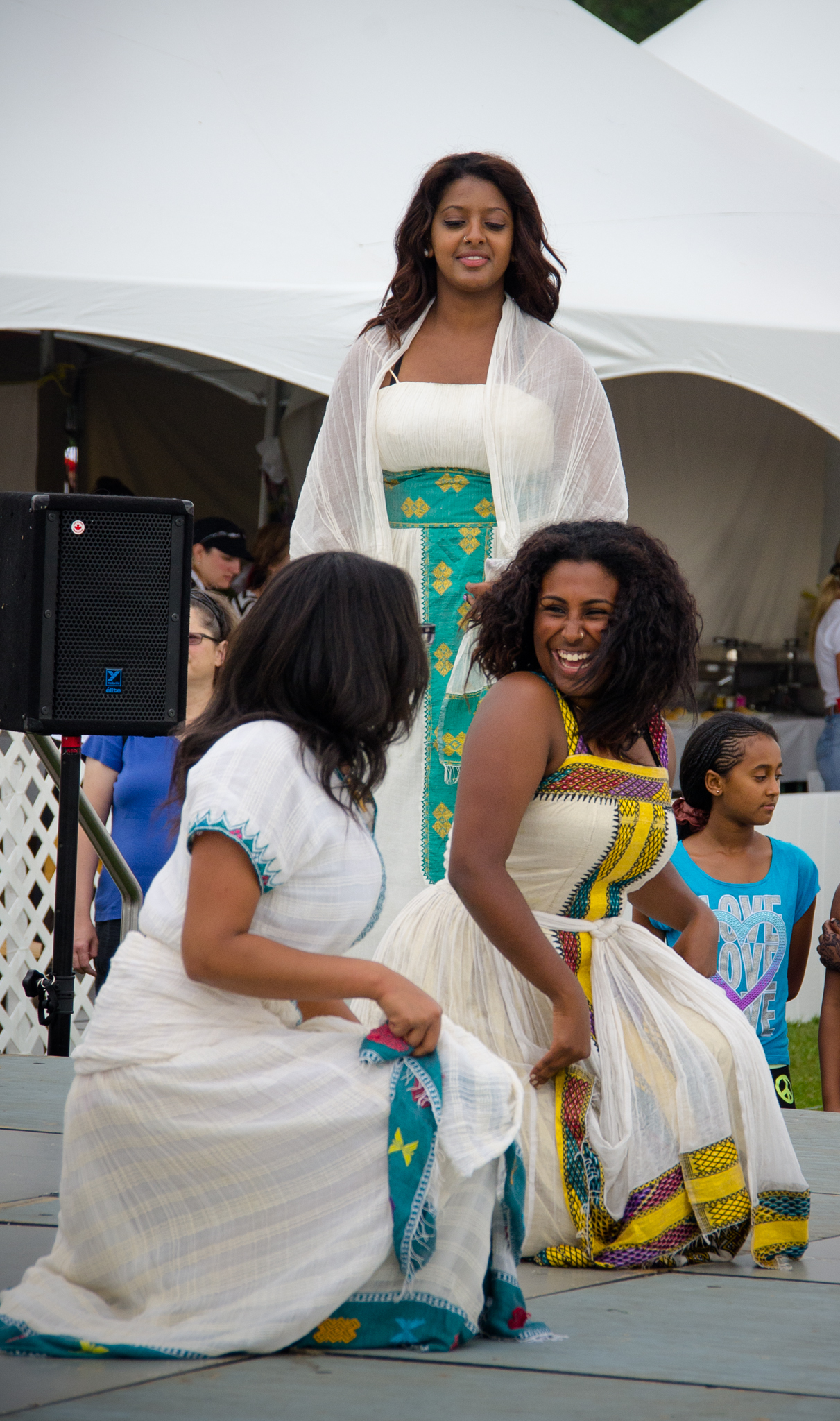
Tigrinya women dancing in traditional zurias

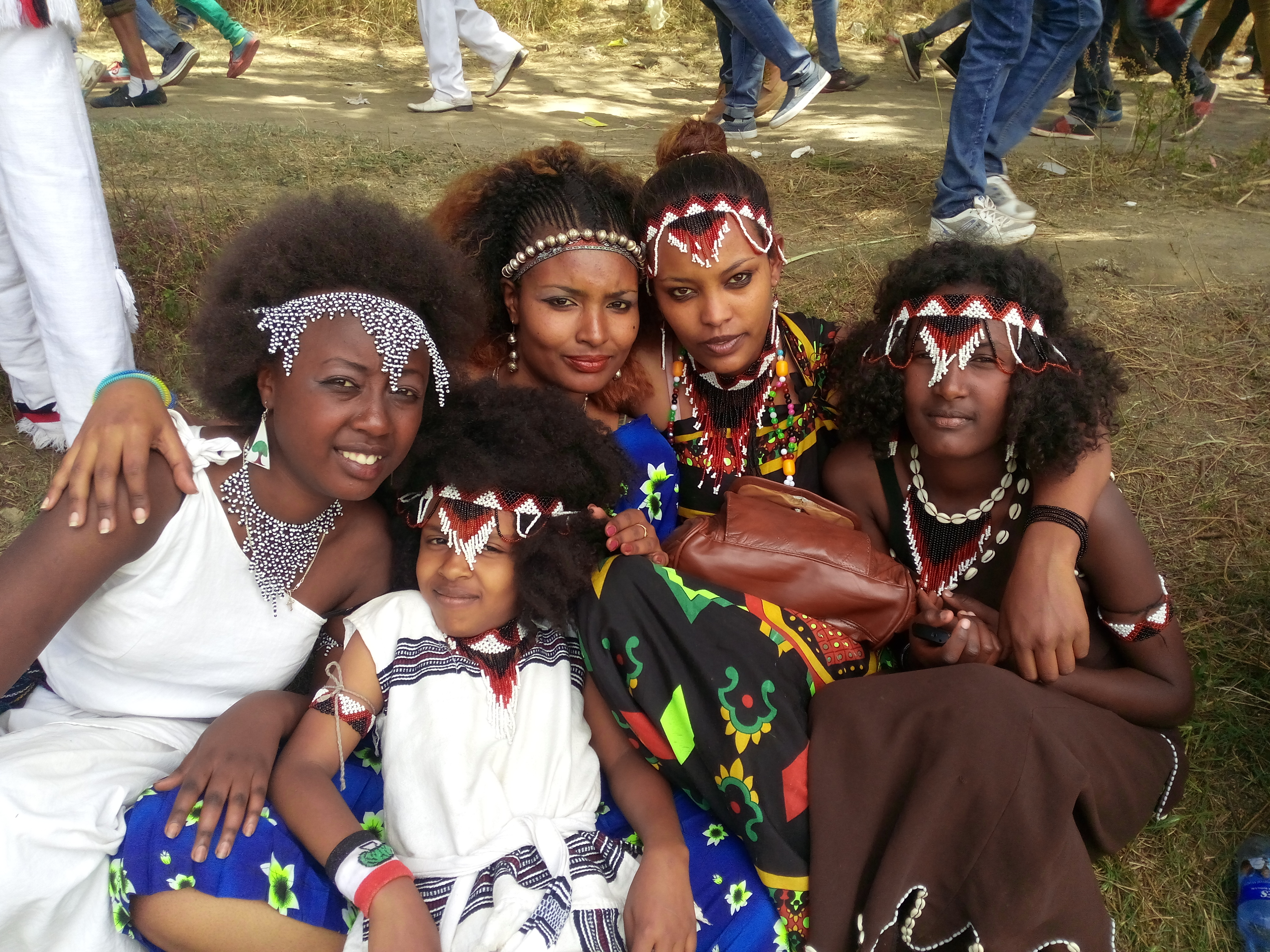
Variety of cultural dress of the Oromo people in Ethiopia

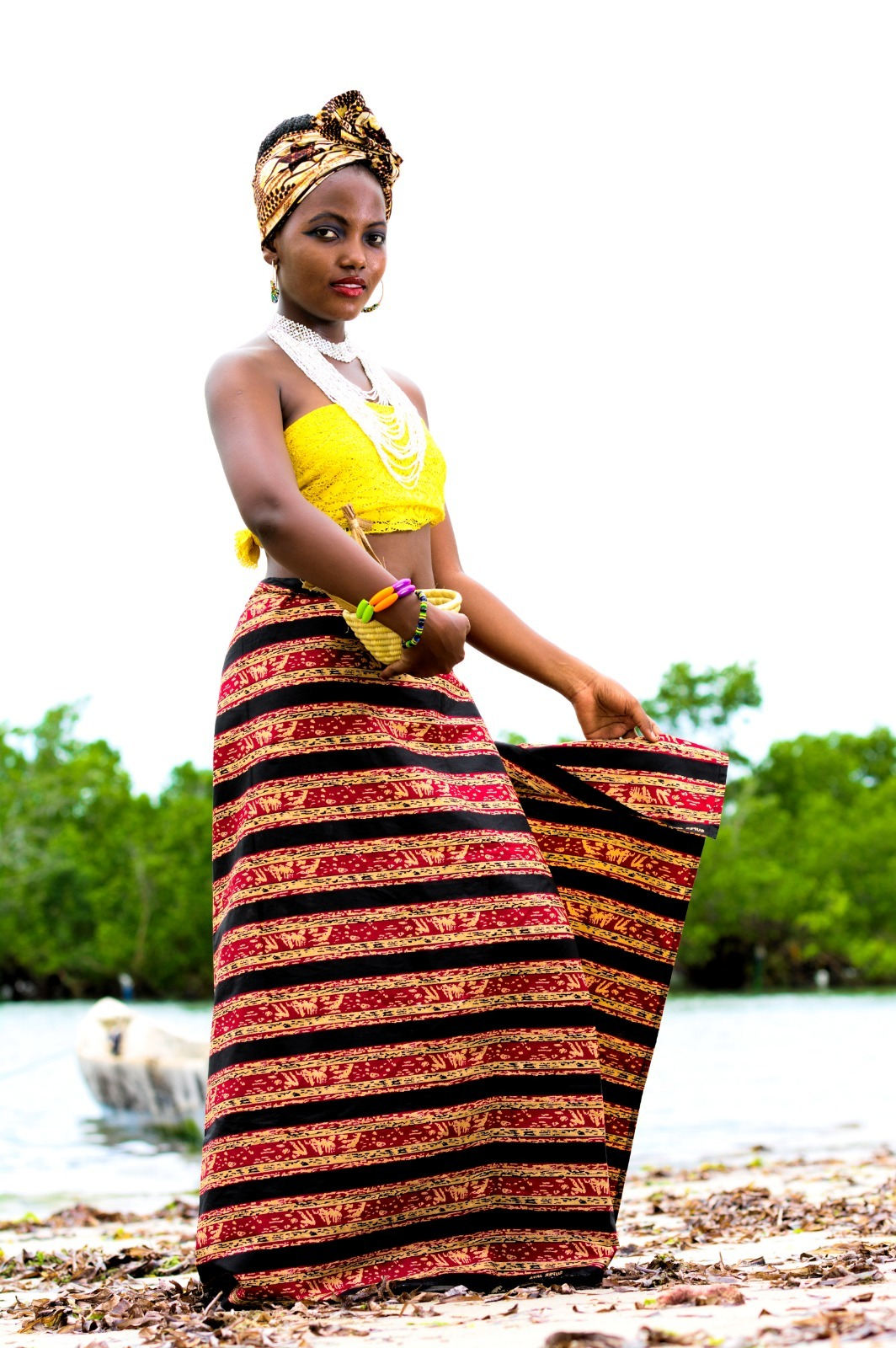
A kitenge dress from Kenya

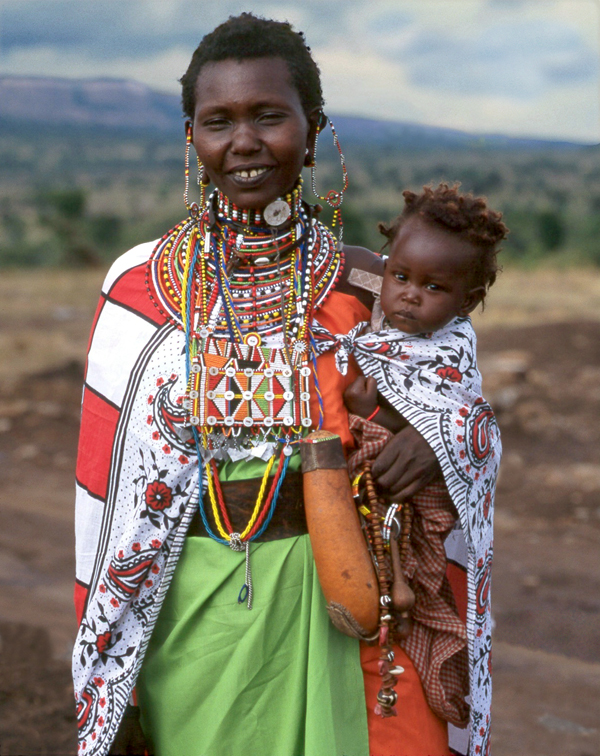
A Maasai woman and child

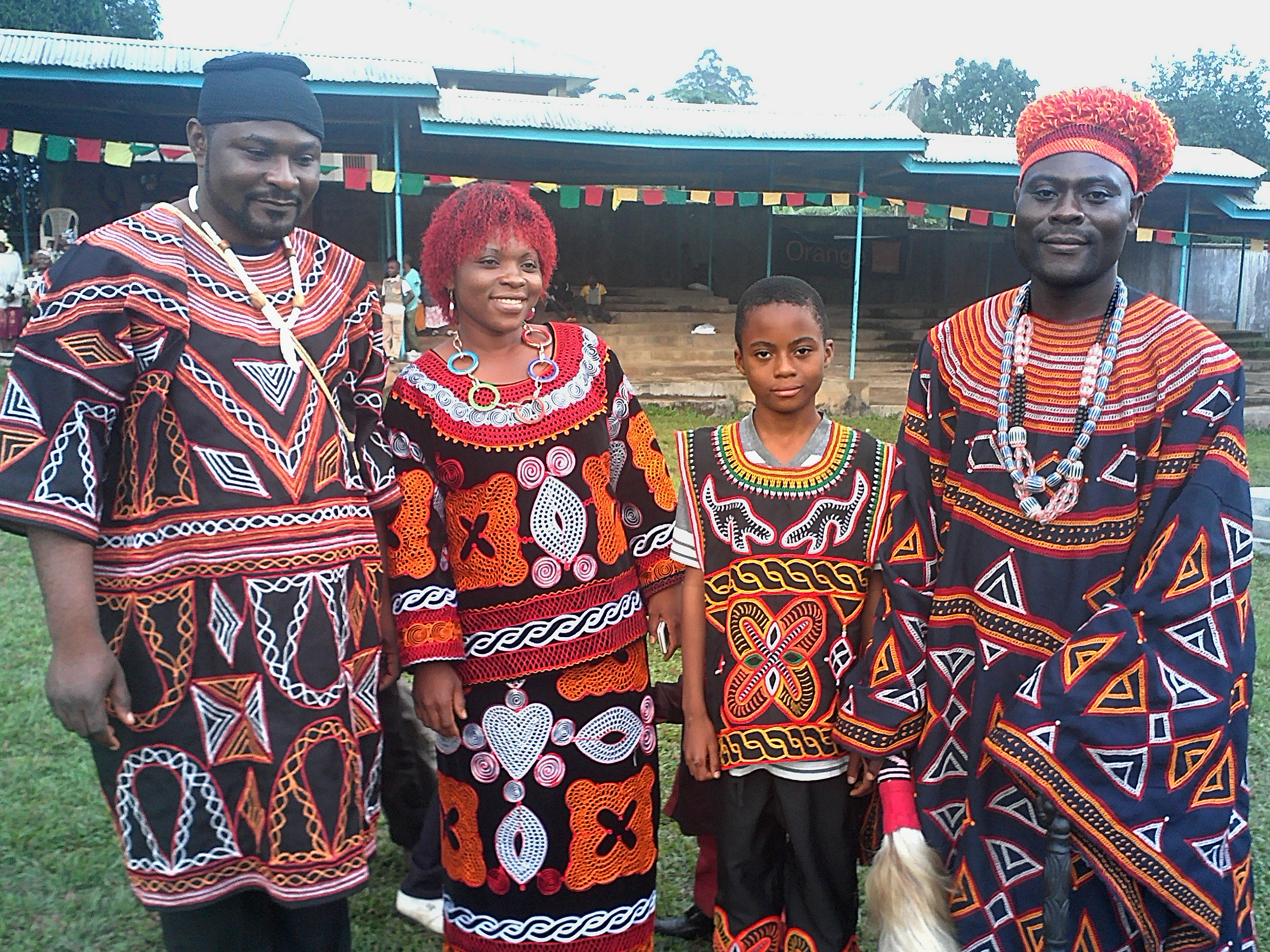
Toghu or tugh, the official traditional regalia of Cameroon.

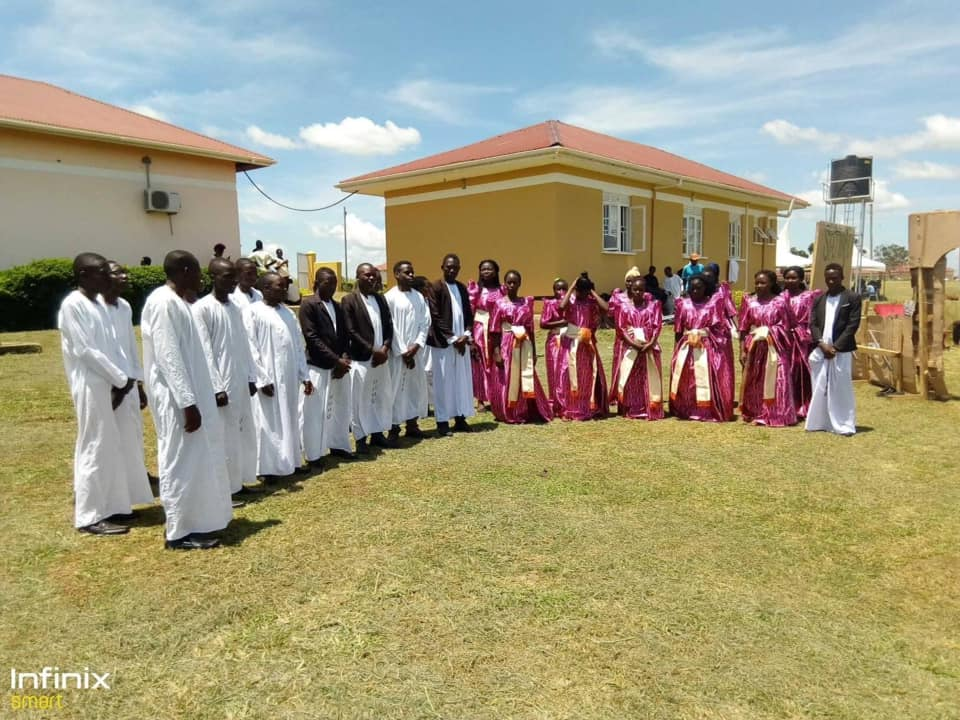
Baganda people in their cultural outfits. Men put on Kanzu, and ladies put on Ggomeesi.

In Botswana, traditional attire includes the ieteisi and tshega.

The imvutano is traditional clothing in Burundi.

In Cameroon, women also wear head tie, men also wear kwa and gandura. Dress is highly dependent on region and ethnicity. The Abacost suit is common in Zairian republics.

Traditional attire of the Comoros includes lesso, shiromani, salouva, aanzu, bwibwi for women, and kofia for men.

In Djibouti, traditional attire includes the macawiis and koofiyad for men, and the dirac and garbasaar for women. The Afar people have their own style of traditional clothing.

Men in Eritrea wear Kidan Habesha as traditional dress. Women wear the zuria or Habesha kemis.

Each ethnic group in Ethiopia has a traditional style of dress. Ethiopian traditional clothing includes the Ethiopian suit or Kidan Habesha for men, and the Habesha kemis for women.

There is no official national costume of Kenya, but leso and kanga are worn throughout the country. Kikoi, similar to kanga fabric, is also widespread. All tribes have their respective traditional garments. For example, Maasai clothing includes traditional shuka and beadwork.

The lamba is part of the traditional dress of Madagascar.

In Mauritius and Réunion, the sega is part of traditional clothing.

In Mozambique, cultural attire includes the capulana.

In Namibia cultural dress includes Herero traditional clothing, like the ohorokova dress and the otjikaiva hat.

The mushanana is traditional clothing in Rwanda and southwestern Uganda.

Seychelles traditional dress includes the kanmtole.

In Somalia, traditional dress includes the kanzu or khamiis and kitenge. For men, traditional clothing also includes the macawiis and koofiyad. Women may wear the dirac, guntiino, and garbasaar.

Traditional dress in Tanzania and Uganda varies by tribe, and may include the kanzu and kofia for men, and the kanga for women.

Kitenge, A piece of fabric wrapped around the chest, is part of the traditional clothing of Malawi, Zambia, and Zimbabwe.

== Americas ==
The word costume in "folk costume" is sometimes considered pejorative particularly among Native Americans, as the word has more than one meaning.

=== Caribbean ===
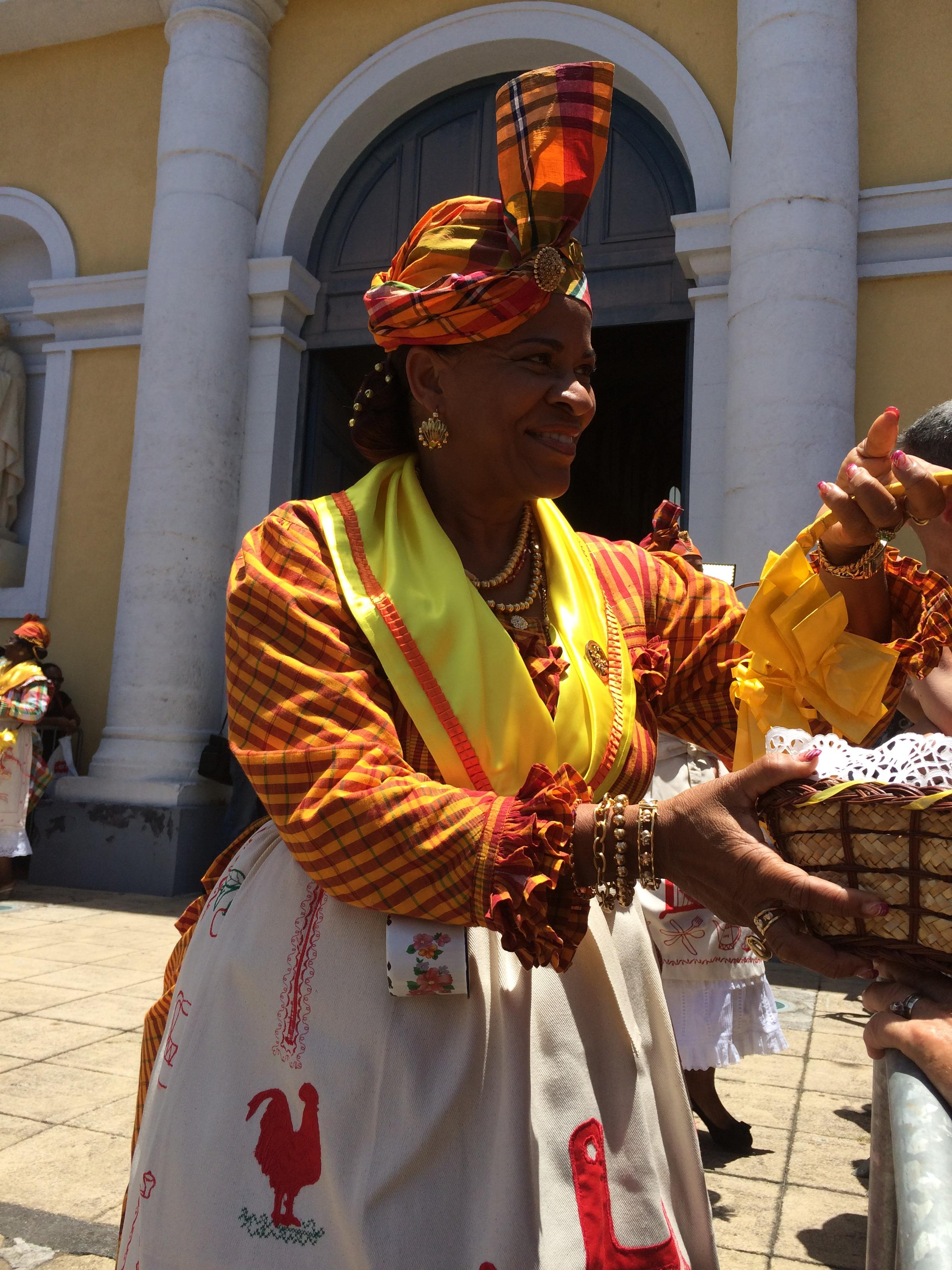
A woman wearing a traditional Guadeloupean dress

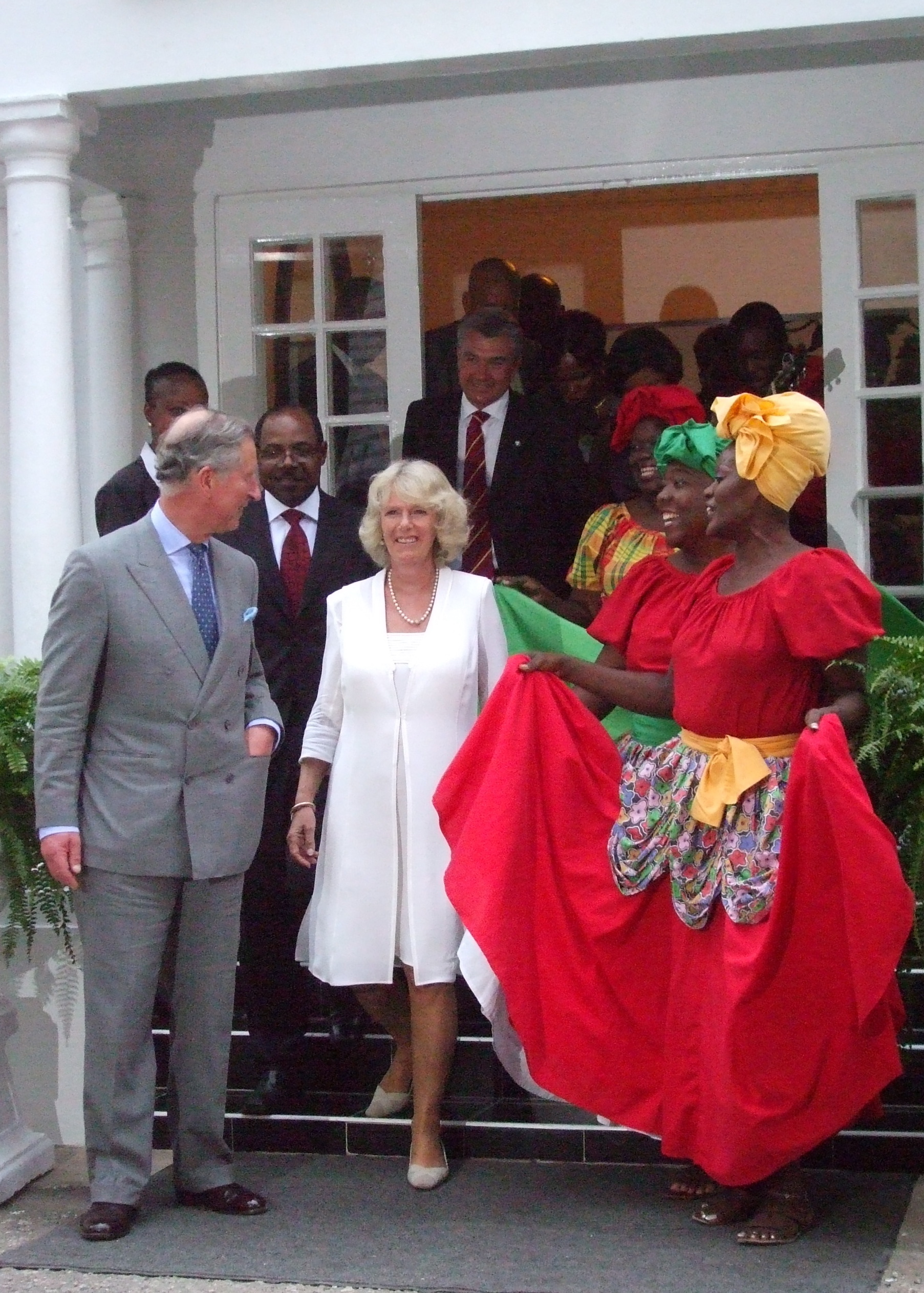
Women wearing the quadrille dress, greeting the British royal family (the King of Jamaica is the same person as the King of the United Kingdom) in Jamaica

For women in Antigua and Barbuda, national attire is a plaid dress with white pinafore, designed by Heather Doram.

There is no official folk dress of the Bahamas, though clothing made with Androsia may be considered traditional attire. Junkanoo costumes can be considered folk costume but fall more into the sector of carnival dress than traditional garment.

In Cuba, traditional dress includes the guayabera and panama hat for men, and the guarachera for women.

Traditional attire in the Dominican Republic includes the chacabana and panama hat.

The madras is part of traditional attire in Dominica.

In Haiti, cultural attire includes the karabela dress for women and shirt jacket for men.

Traditional attire in Jamaica includes the bandana cloth Quadrille dress for women, bandana cloth shirt and white trousers for men, and the Jamaican Tam.

In Puerto Rico, men's traditional clothing includes the guayabera and panama hat. Women's traditional attire includes the enagua.

The madras is part of traditional attire in Saint Lucia.

Cultural dress varies in Trinidad and Tobago. Tobago has an Afro–Tobagonian creole culture with bélé costumes as their typical garment, commonly made of madras. Trinidad has no defined national garment. During cultural occasions, Afro–Trinidadian and Tobagonian men wear guayabera or dashiki, and women wear a booboo. Indo–Trinidadian and Tobagonian men wear kurta, dhoti, sherwani, and women wear sari, choli, and lehenga.

=== Central America ===
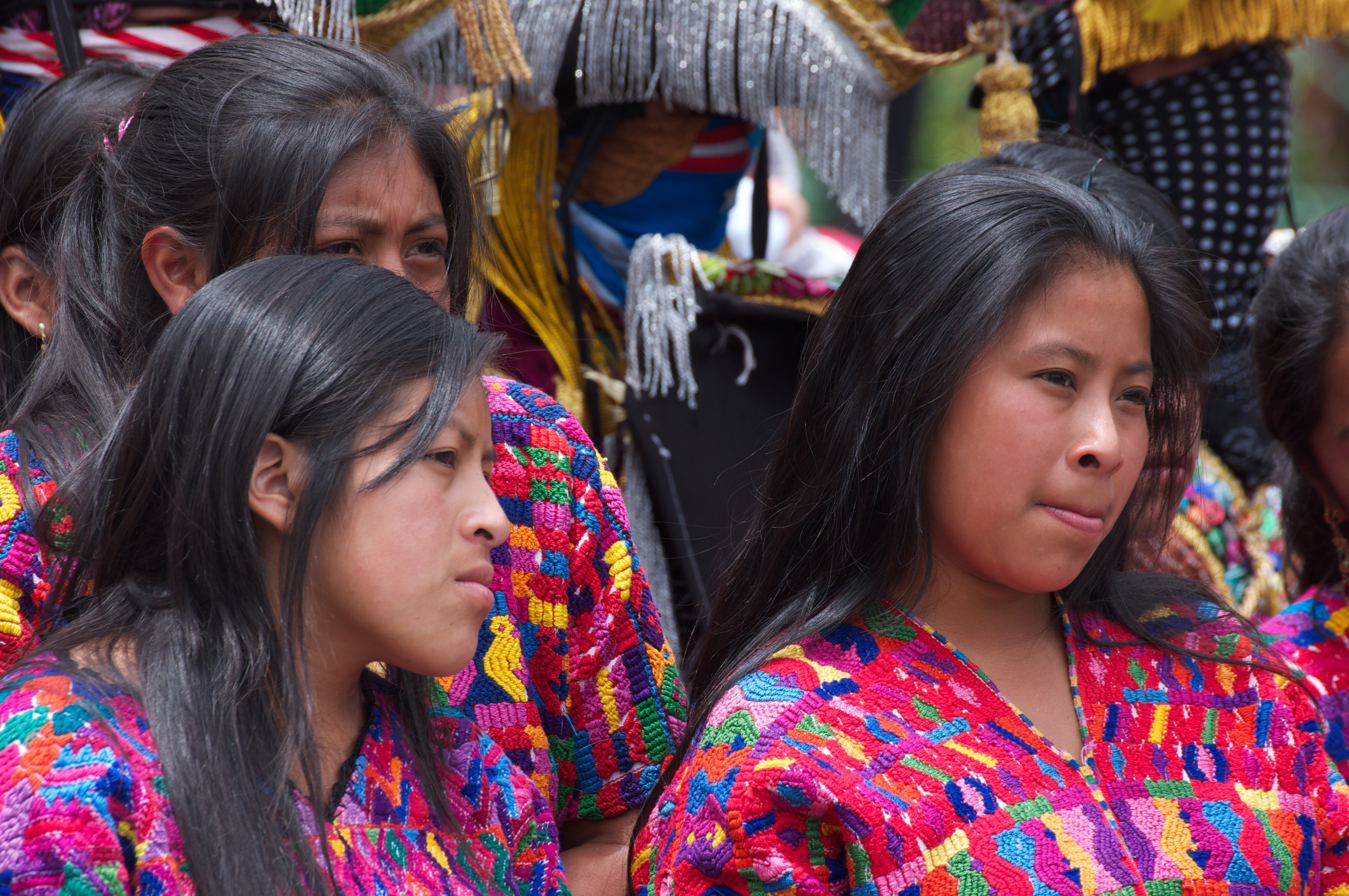
Young Mayan women in traditional dress in Antigua, Guatemala

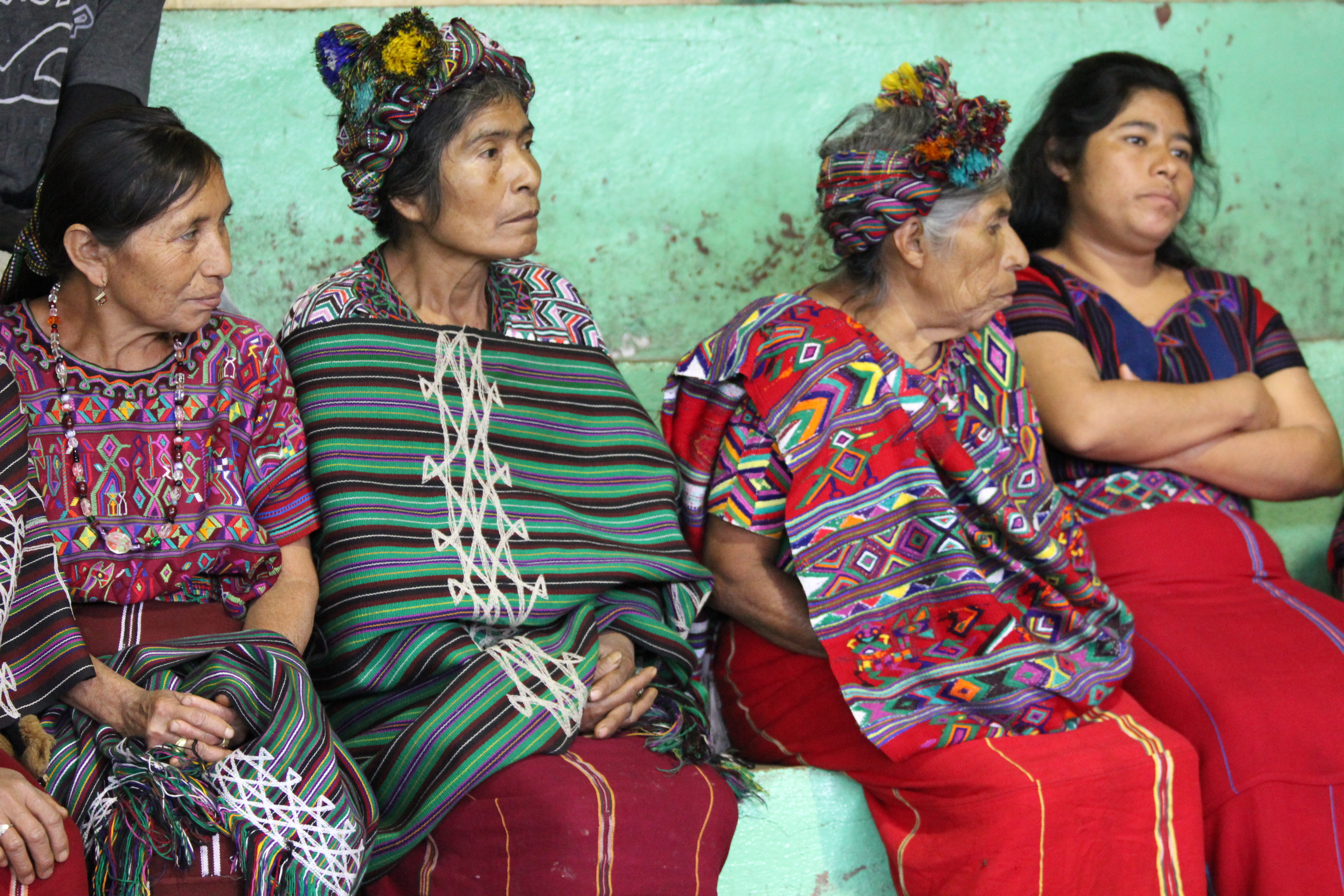
Mayan folk clothing in Guatemala

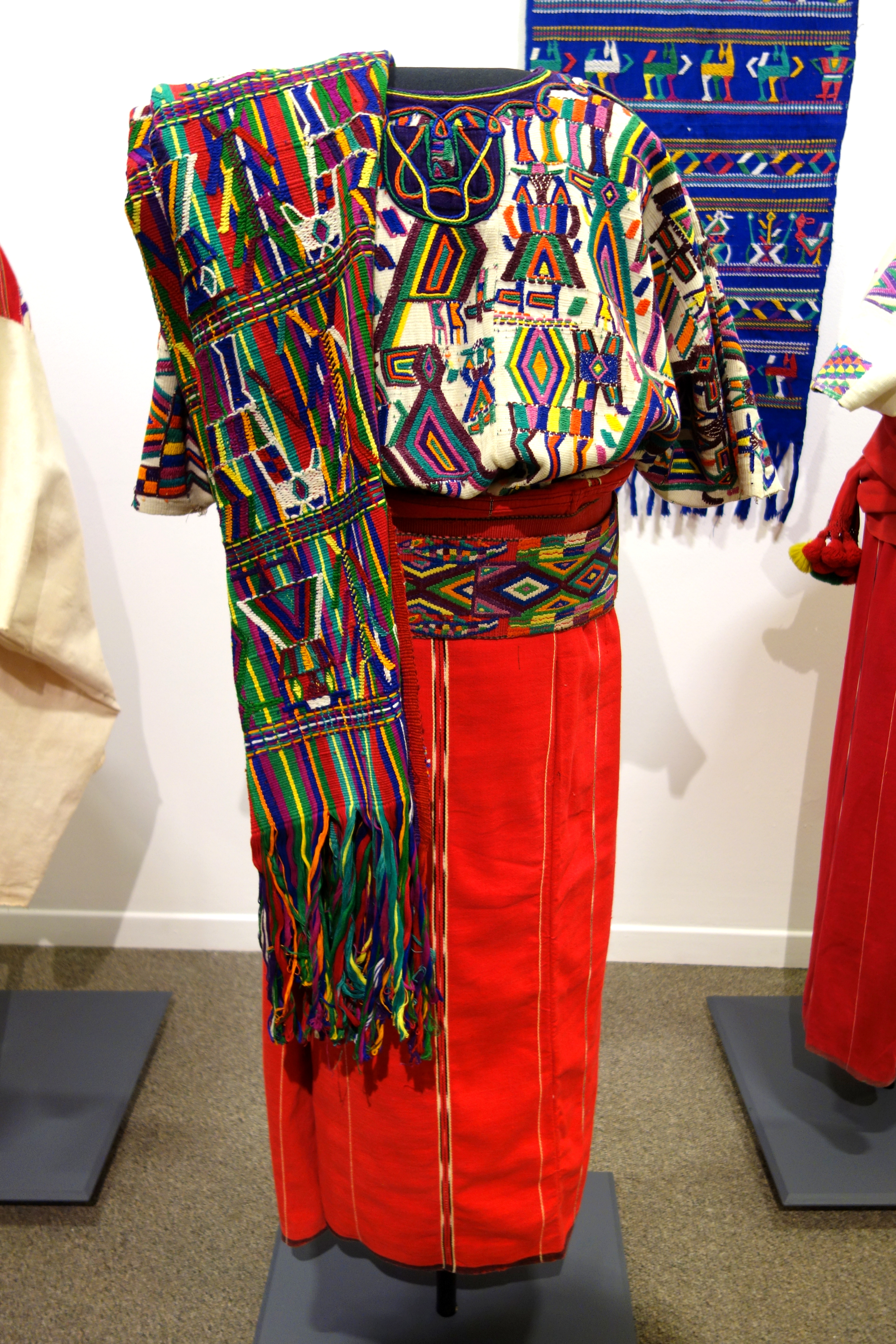
Nebaj Ixil Huipil (c. 1950)

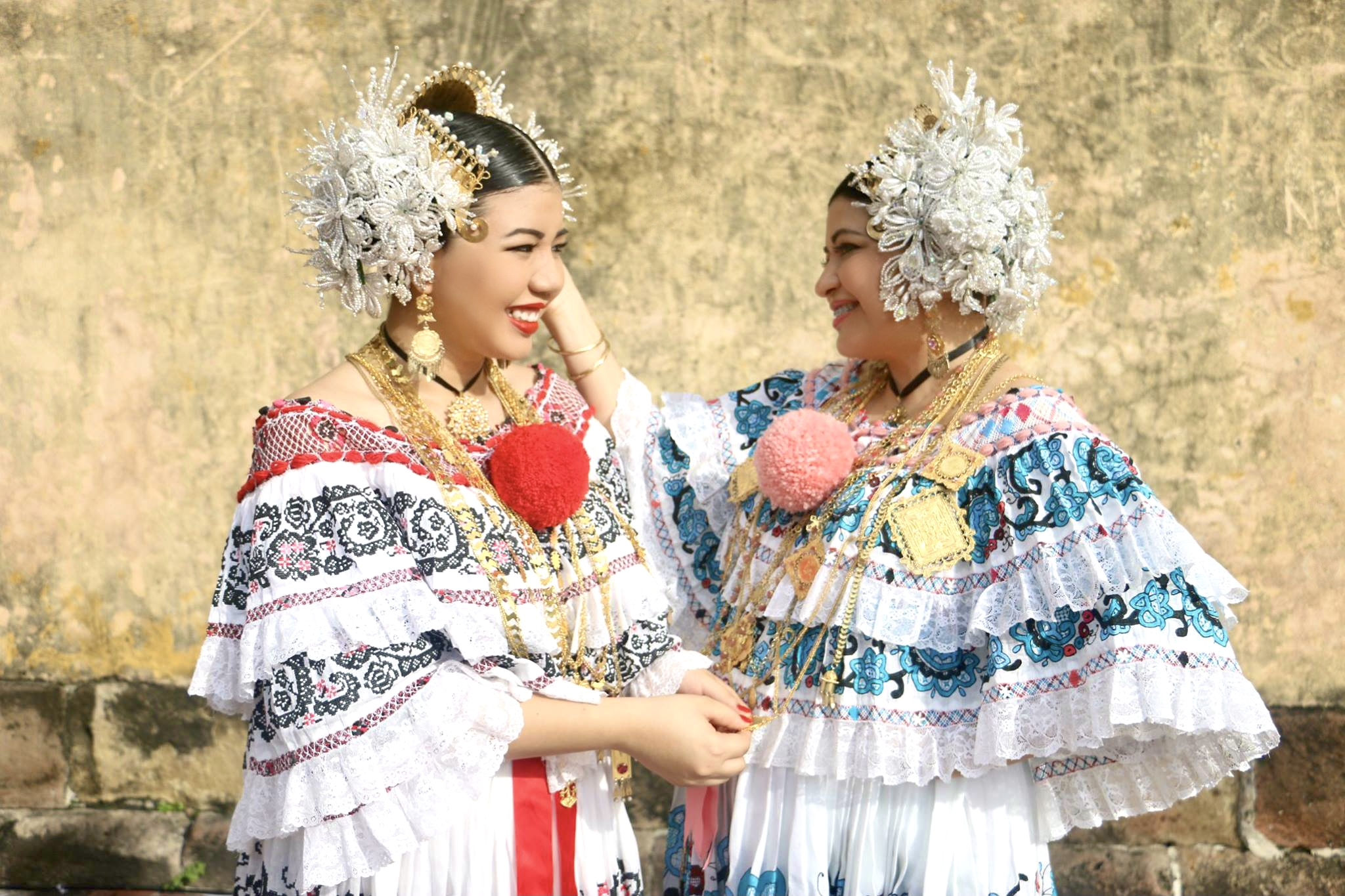
Two women wearing pollera in Panama

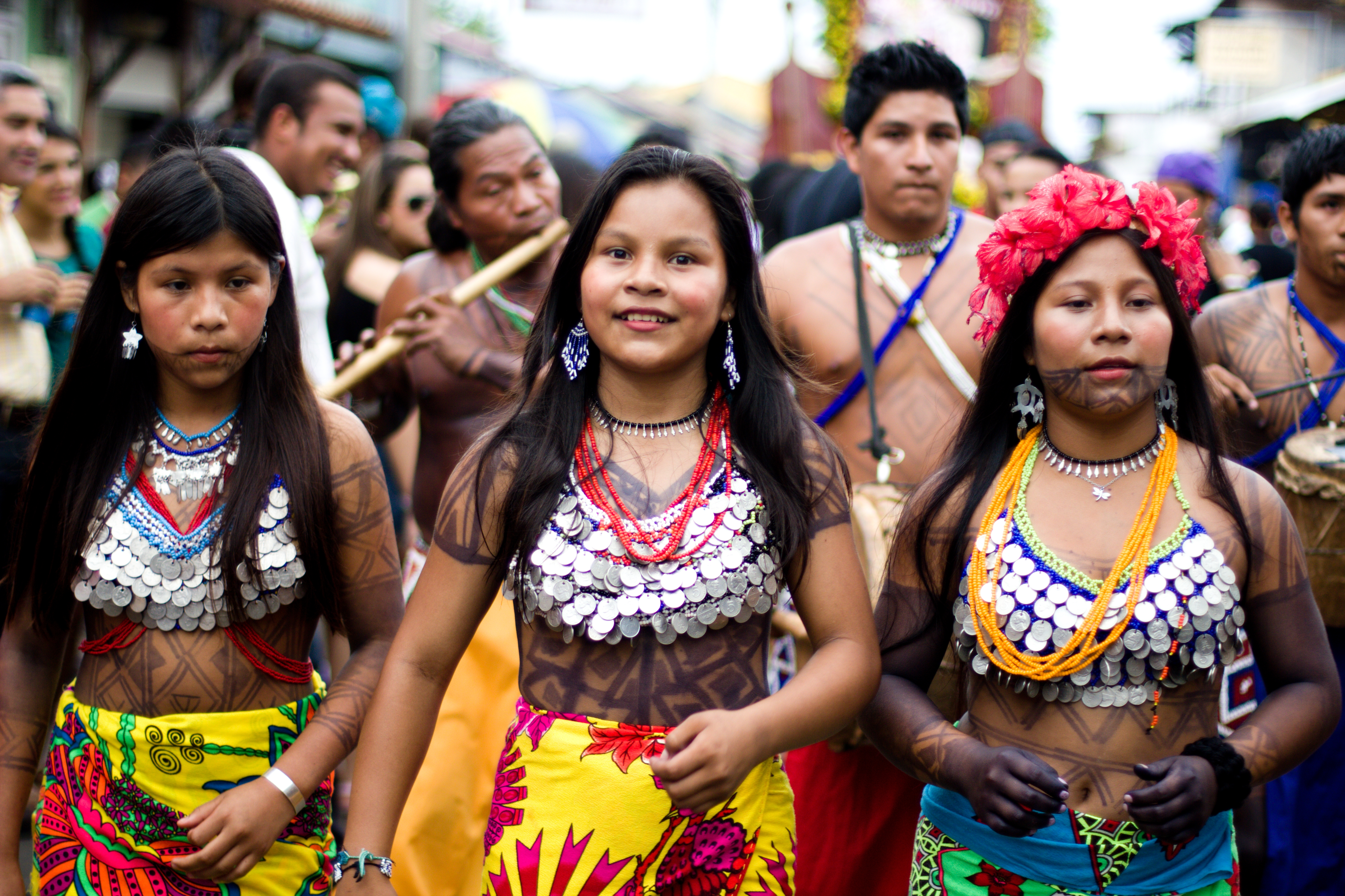
Emberá girls in Panama

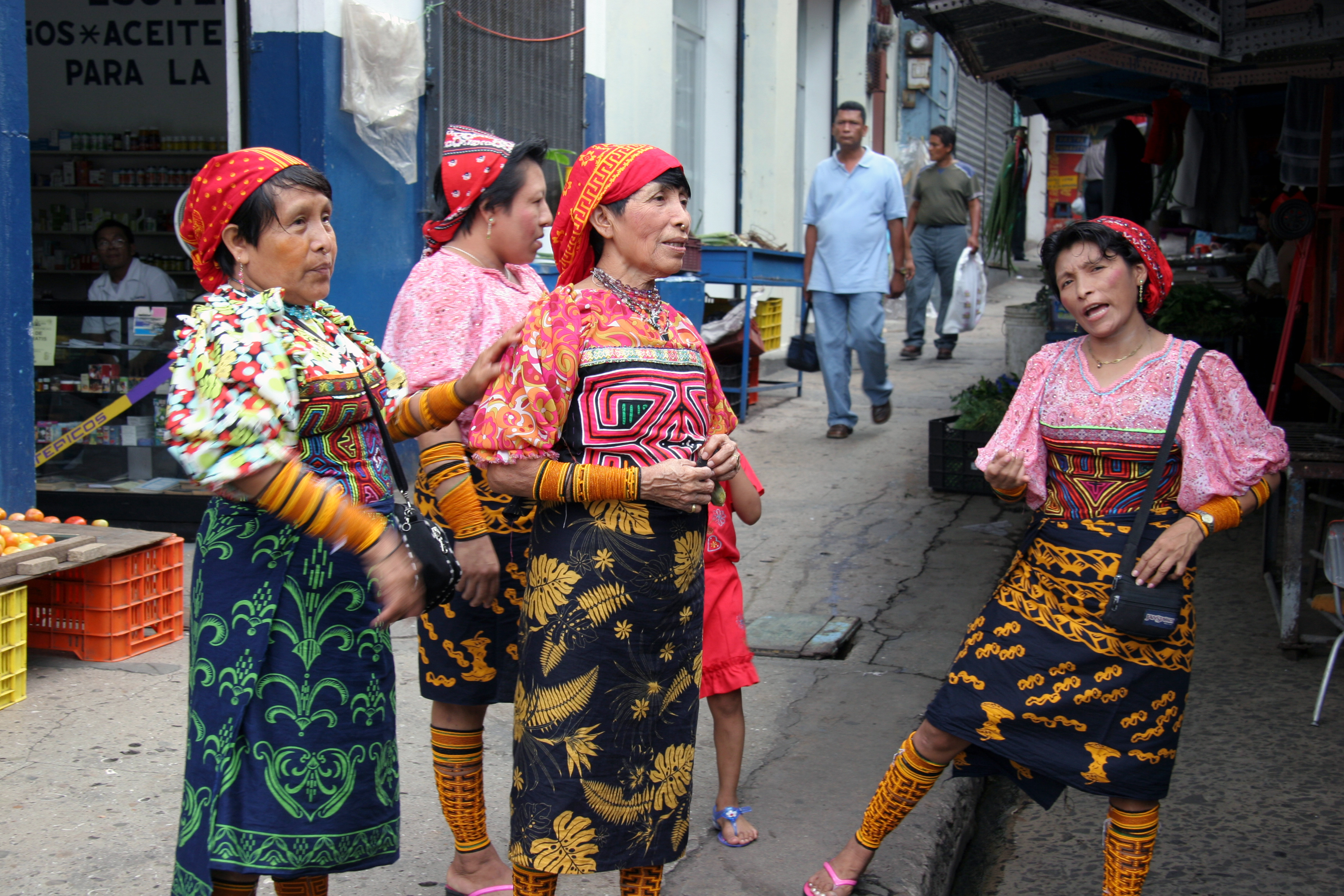
Guna women wearing molas

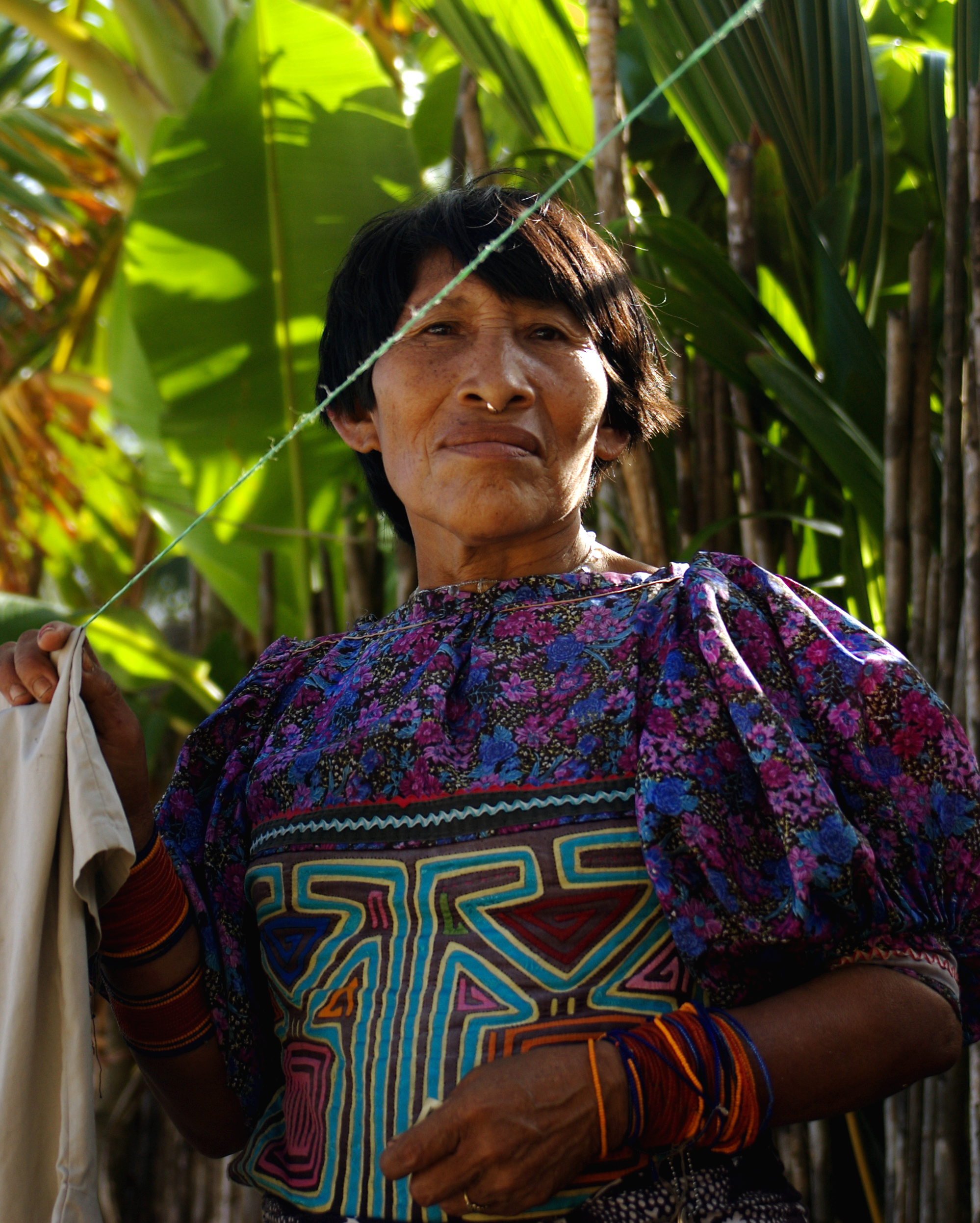
Guna woman wearing mola

In Belize, among Hispanic Belizeans, traditional attire includes the huipil for women and the guayabera for men. Among the Maya peoples, all tribes wear distinct kinds of dress.

Among women in Nicaragua, traditional attire includes the huipil and rebozo. Men wear the cotona.

In Guatemala, traditional clothing includes the huipil, corte skirt, and tocado for women, and the todosantero suit for men.

Traditional attire in Panama includes the pollera for women and montuno for men.

==== Mexico ====
The folk dress of Mexico varies by state. For men, traditional dress includes the charro outfit, guayabera, sarape, and sombrero. For women, it includes the rebozo and china poblana dress.

In el Norte, traditional attire may include cowboy hats, cowboy boots, and bandana. Indigenous peoples, like the Yaqui, Seri and Rarámuri, wear traditional apparel. The cuera tamaulipeca ('tamaulipeca leather jacket') is traditional attire in Tamaulipas.

In Querétaro, Hidalgo, and San Luis Potosí, traditional clothing includes the quechquemitl.

In Veracruz, traditional attire includes the guayabera. In Yucatán, it includes the guayabera for men and huipil for women.

The tehuana is traditional attire in Oaxaca.

In Chiapas, the Chiapaneca outfit is traditional attire.

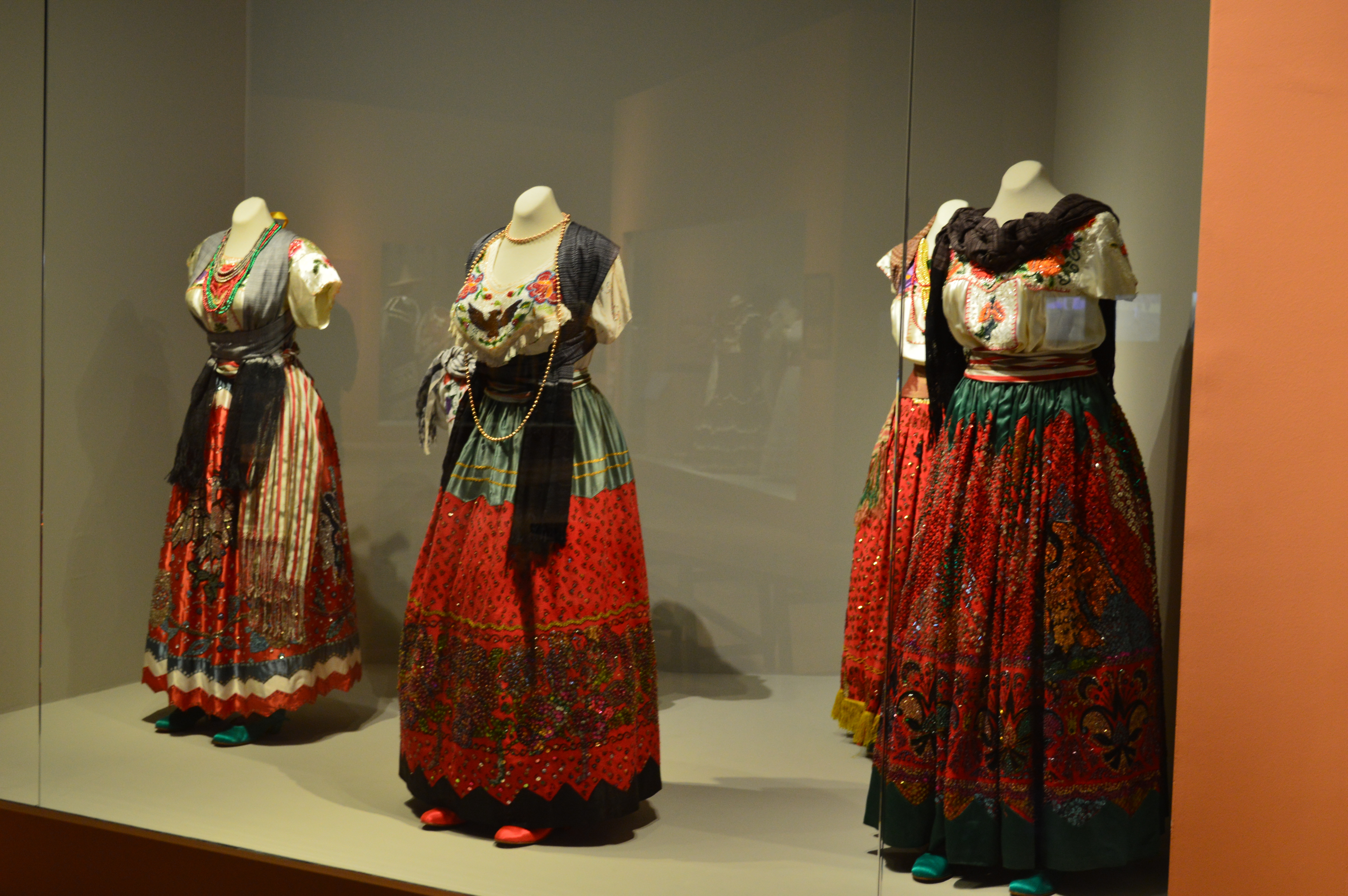
China poblana dress

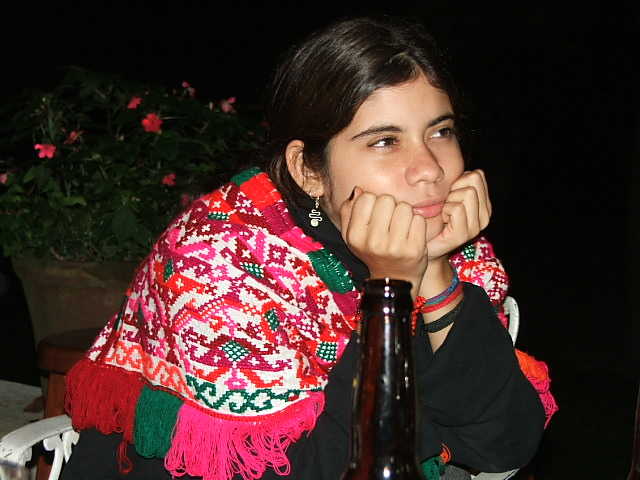
Quezquémetl of the Huasteca Potosina

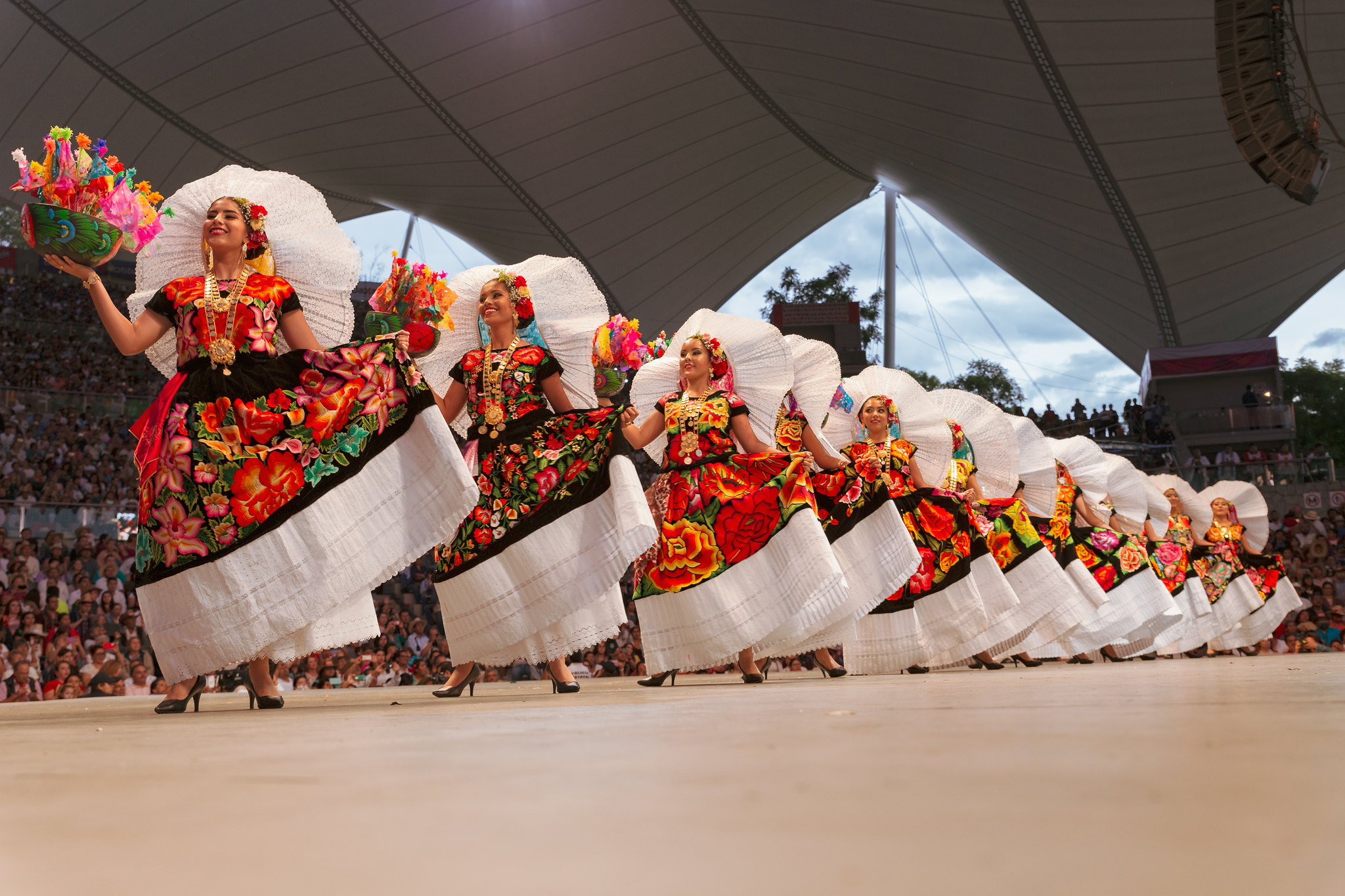
Dancers wearing traditional tehuana of Oaxaca

=== North America ===
==== Canada ====
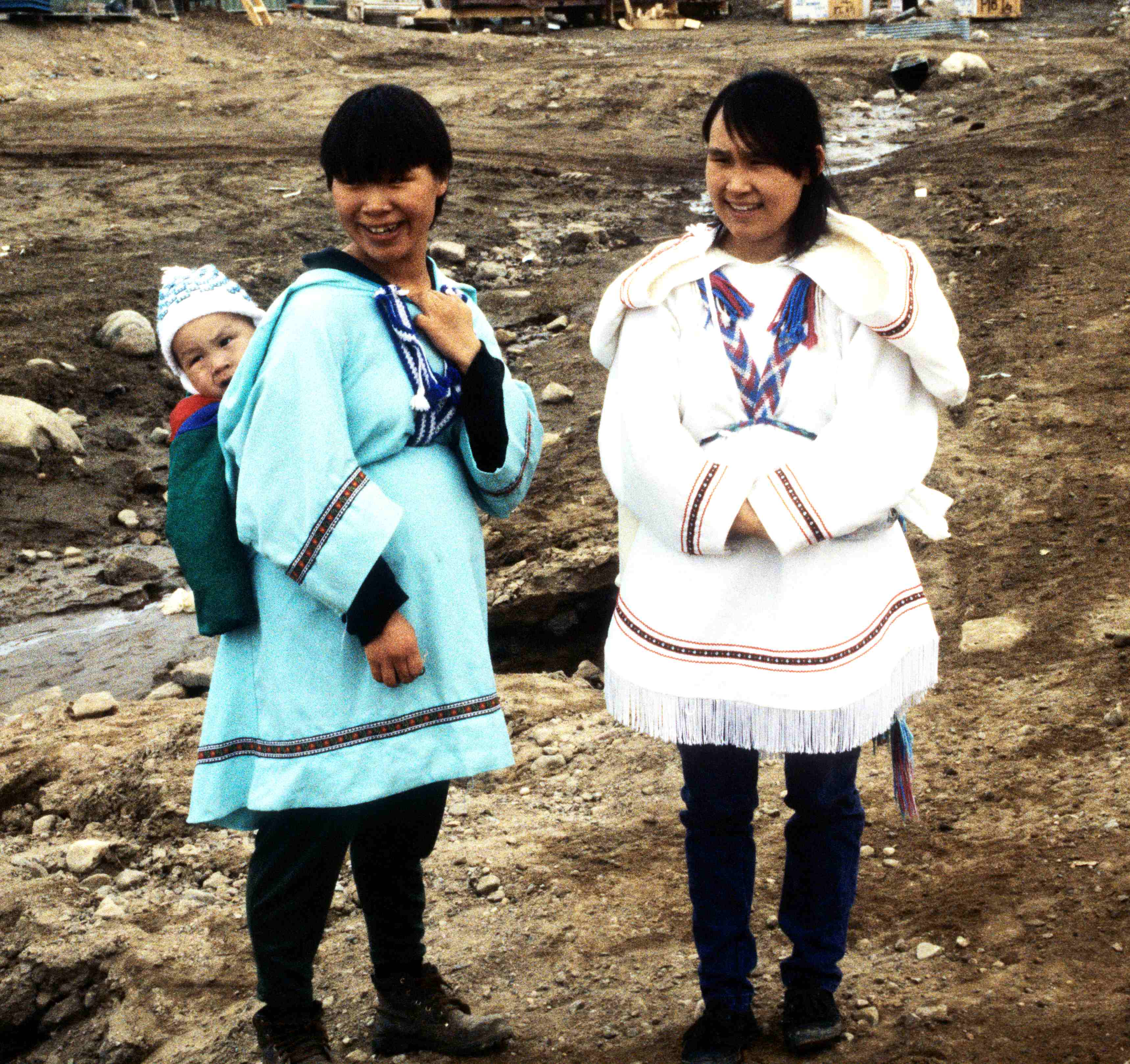
Two Inuit women wearing amautiit (skirted style, akuliq) in Nunavut (1995)

Cowichan sweater featuring the Thunderbird design

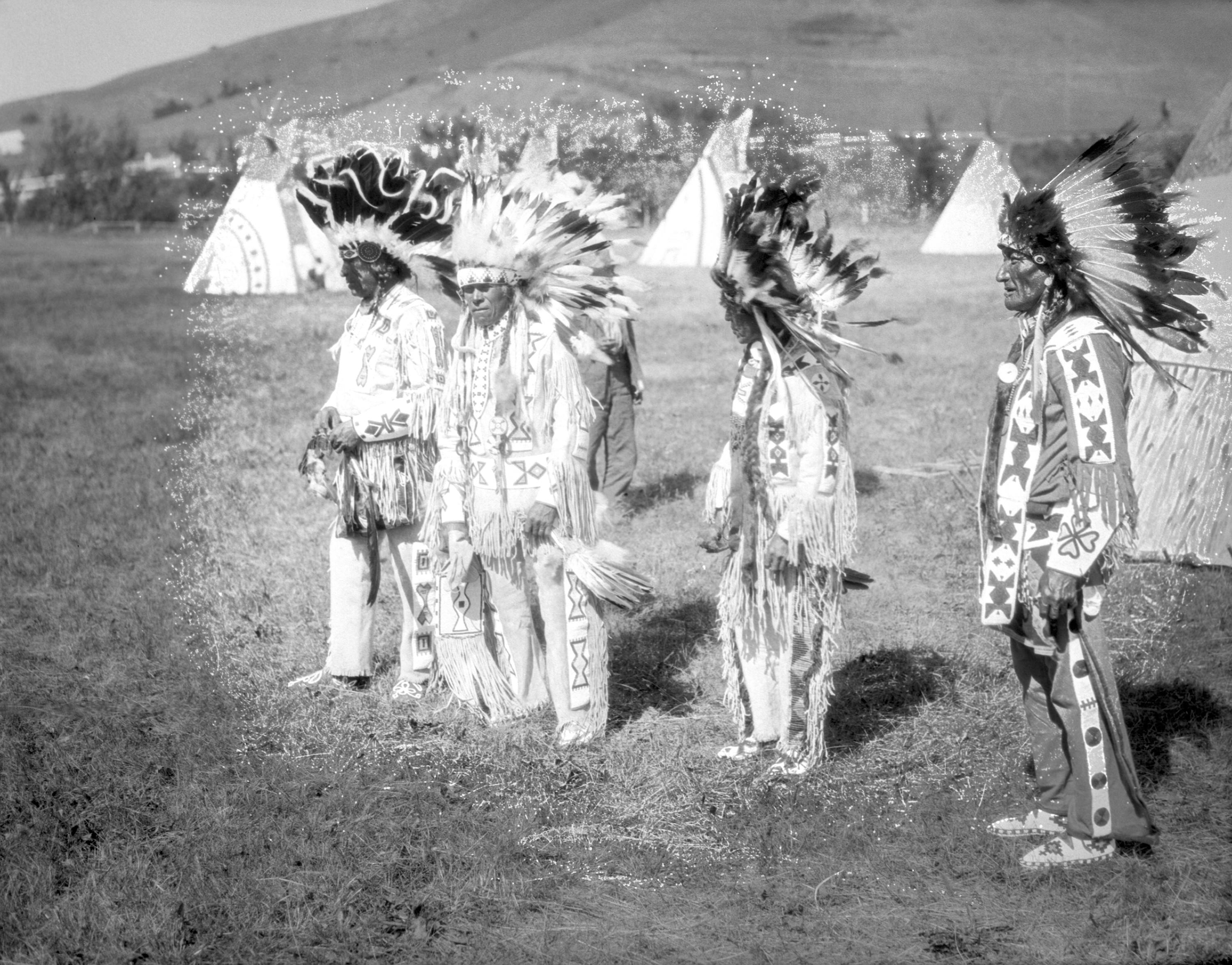
Unidentified Plains Cree at a powwow in Fort Qu'Appelle, Saskatchewan

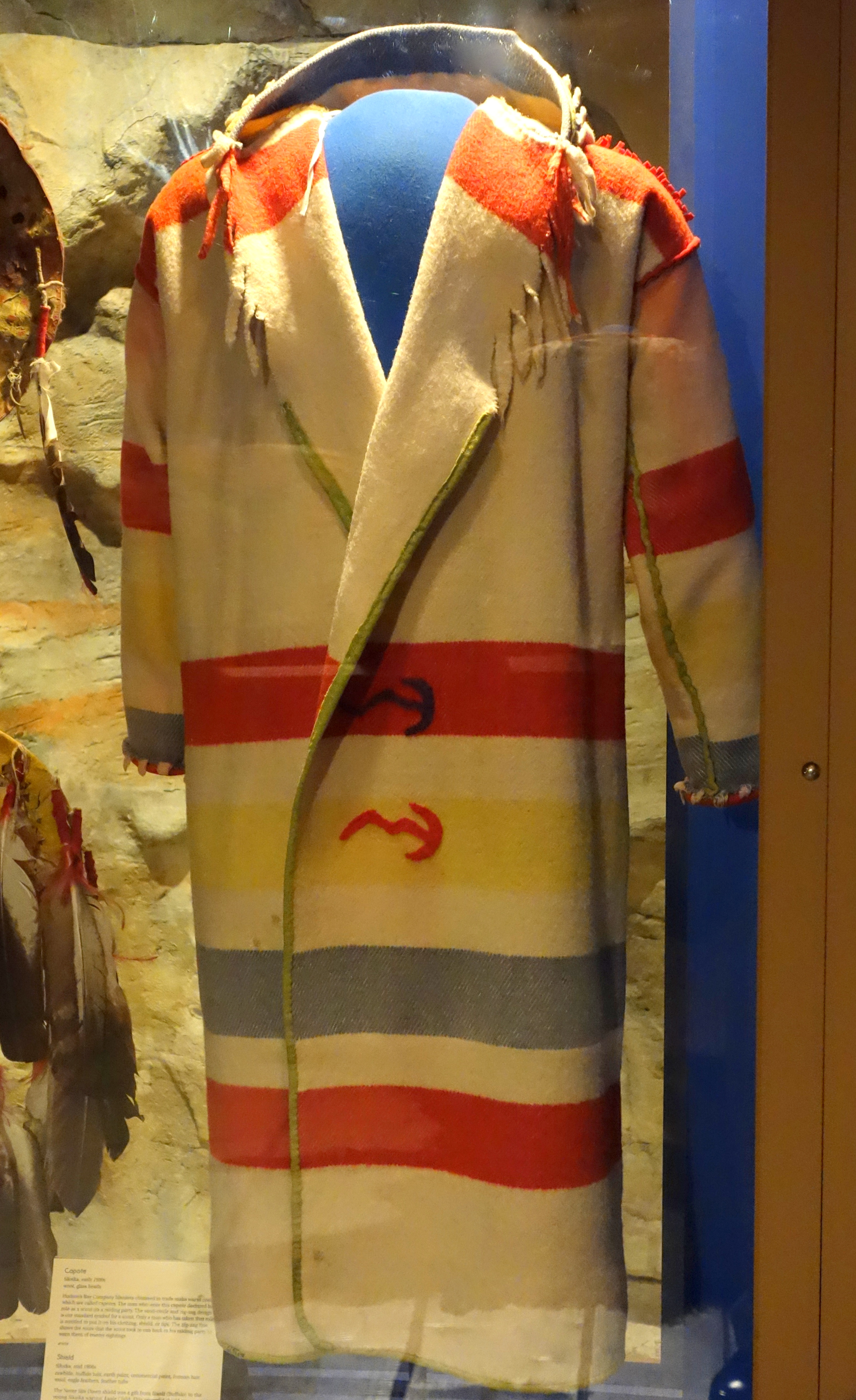
A Siksika Blackfoot capote made from a Hudson's Bay point blanket

In Canada, different regions have different traditional clothing. Nationally, Hudson's Bay Company began selling Hudson's Bay point blanket coat in 1922, blending the features of traditional mackinaw jackets and capotes. These point blanket coats came in a variety of colours and would become considered a "national dress".

The traditional dress of First Nations peoples, which is often called "regalia", may include the button blanket, buckskins, moccasins, Chilkat blanket, Cowichan sweater, and war bonnet. Traditional attire of the Métis includes the ceinture fléchée, capote, and moccasins. In Nunavut and other Inuit communities, traditional clothing includes the parka, mukluks, and amauti.

For lumberjacks of Quebec and Ontario, traditional logging wear includes mackinaw jackets or flannel shirts, with headgear being a tuque or trapper hat; a good example is seen with folk characters like Big Joe Mufferaw.

In the Maritimes, Acadians wear their traditional heritage clothing on special occasions like the Tintamarre. The Scottish background in Nova Scotia has brought the Nova Scotia tartan as folk wear in the form of kilts, aboyne dresses, and trews for Scottish highland dance competitions.

In Quebec and among French Canadians, traditional clothing includes the ceinture fléchée, capote, and tuque.

In the Prairies, cowboy costume is common for events such as the Calgary Stampede, and is often worn with Calgary White Hats.

Newfoundland – Traditional mummers dress in masks and baggy clothes in Christmas season celebrations; the Cornish influence has also brought yellow oilskins and sou'westers as typical wear in coastal areas.

===== Greenland =====
In Greenland, traditional attire includes the anorak.

==== United States ====
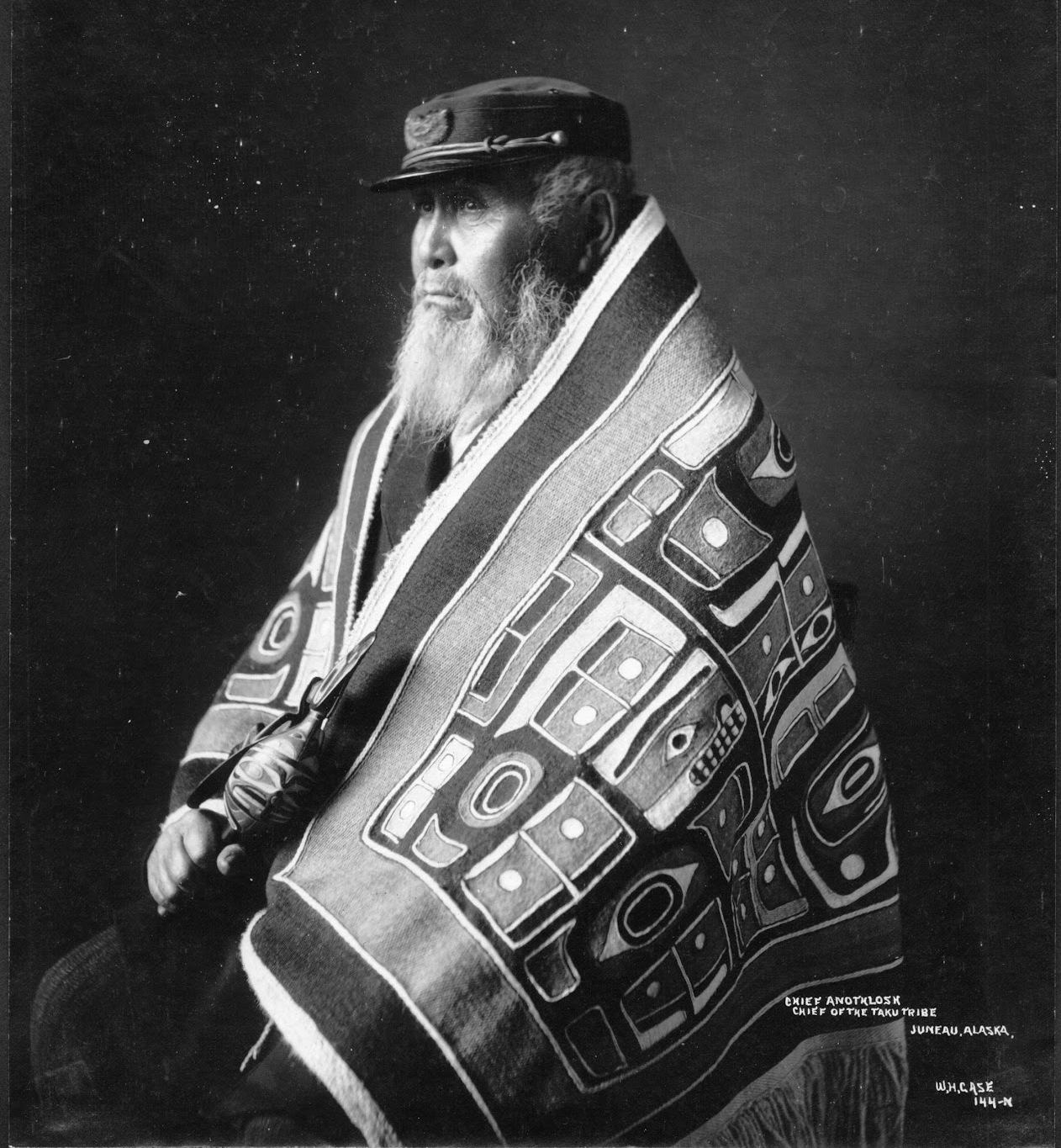
Chief Anotklosh (Taku) wearing a Chilkat robe (c. 1913)

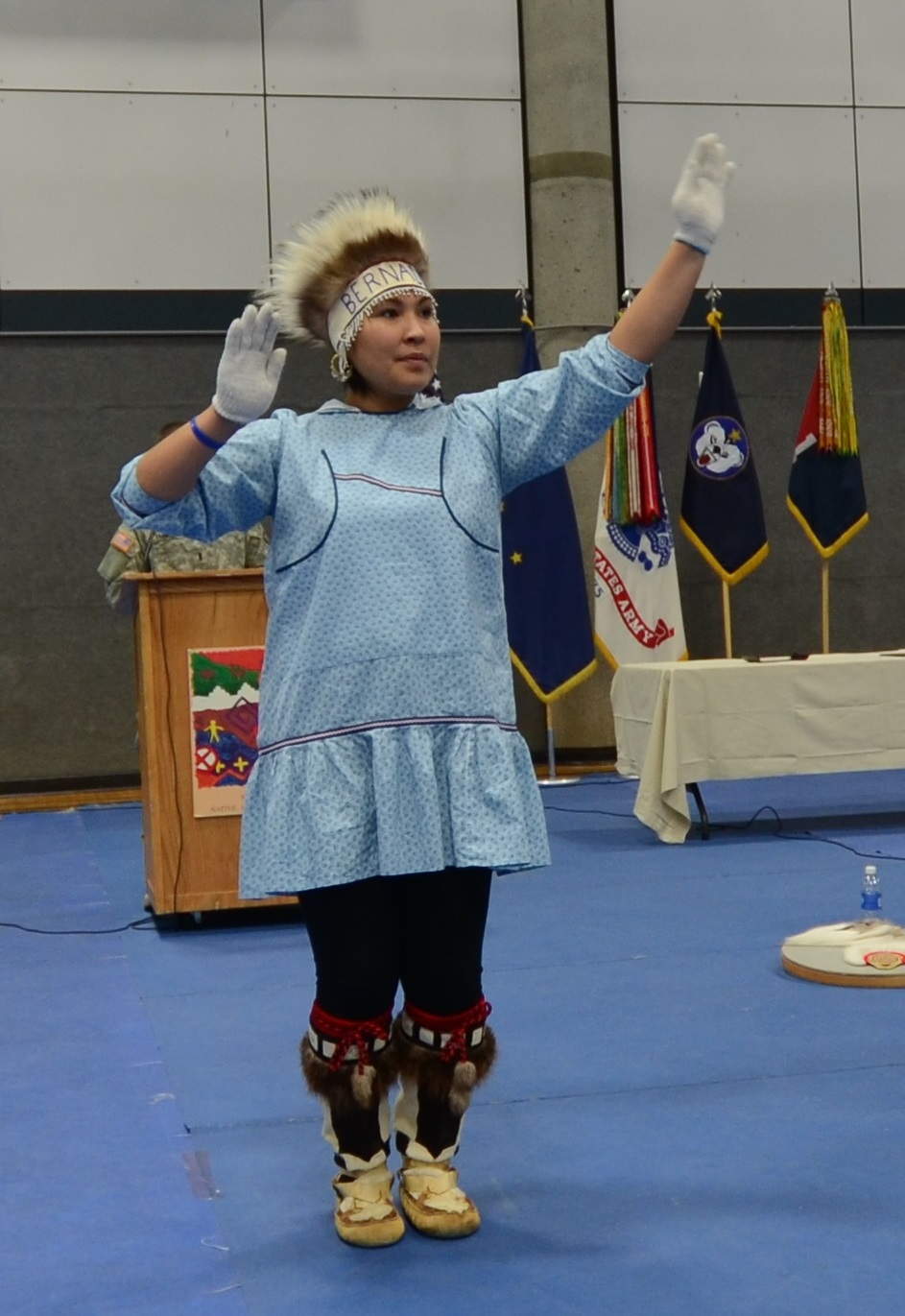
Alaska Native dancer performing in a kuspuk (2013)

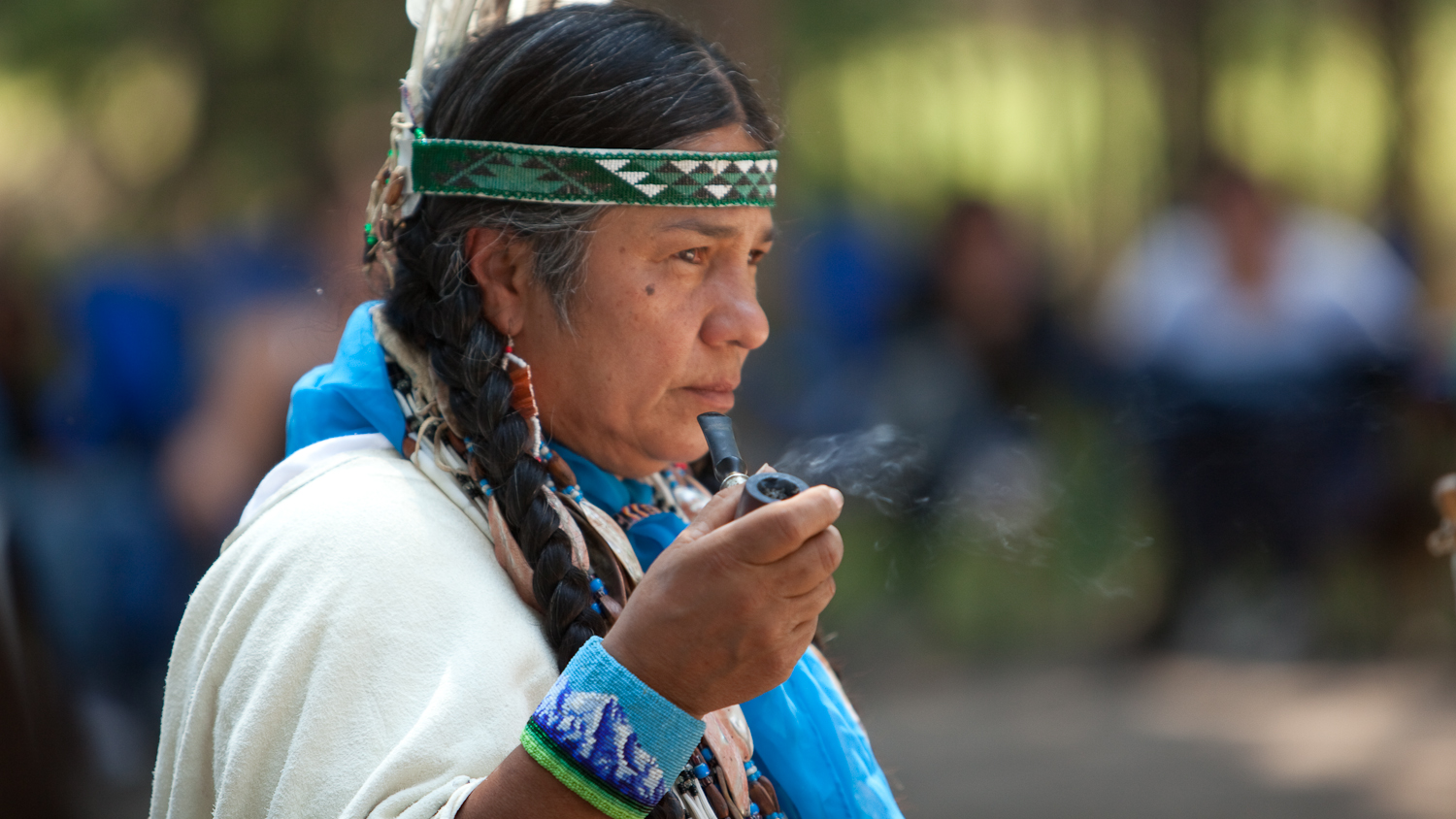
Winnemem Wintu chief Caleen Sisk in traditional dress (2009)

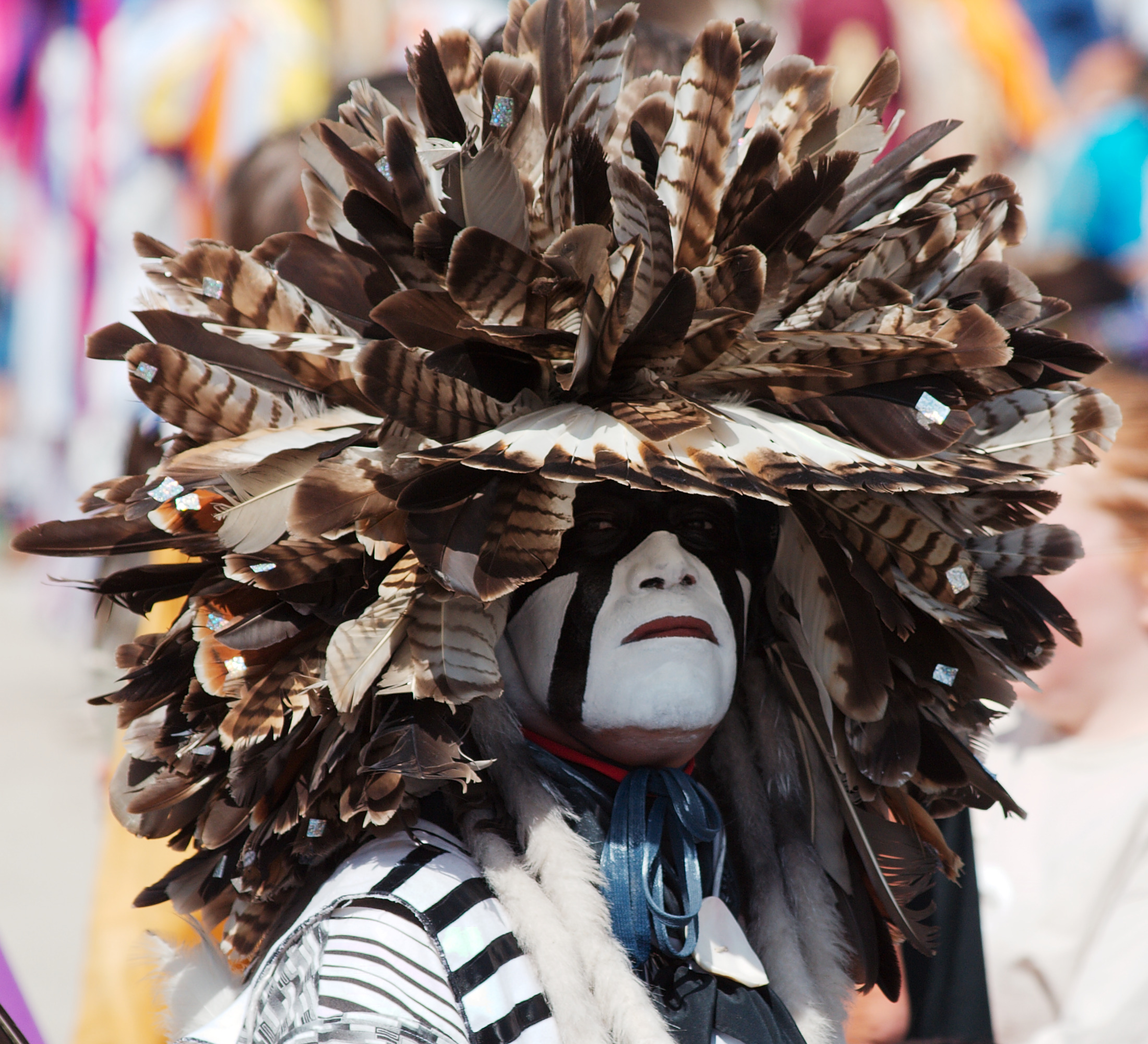
Cheyenne dog soldier wearing a feathered headdress (2008)

In the United States, different regions have different traditional clothing.

Styles of traditional Native American clothing vary. Traditional pow-wow regalia for Plains Indians may include moccasins, buckskins, glass beads, breech clouts, and war bonnets or roaches. For Native Americans of the Northeastern Woodlands, matchcoat and wampum are used. Among Alaska Natives, traditional attire includes kuspuks worn with dark pants and mukluks, as well as parkas. The clothing of the Yupʼik people is designed to keep the wearer warm and dry in cold weather.

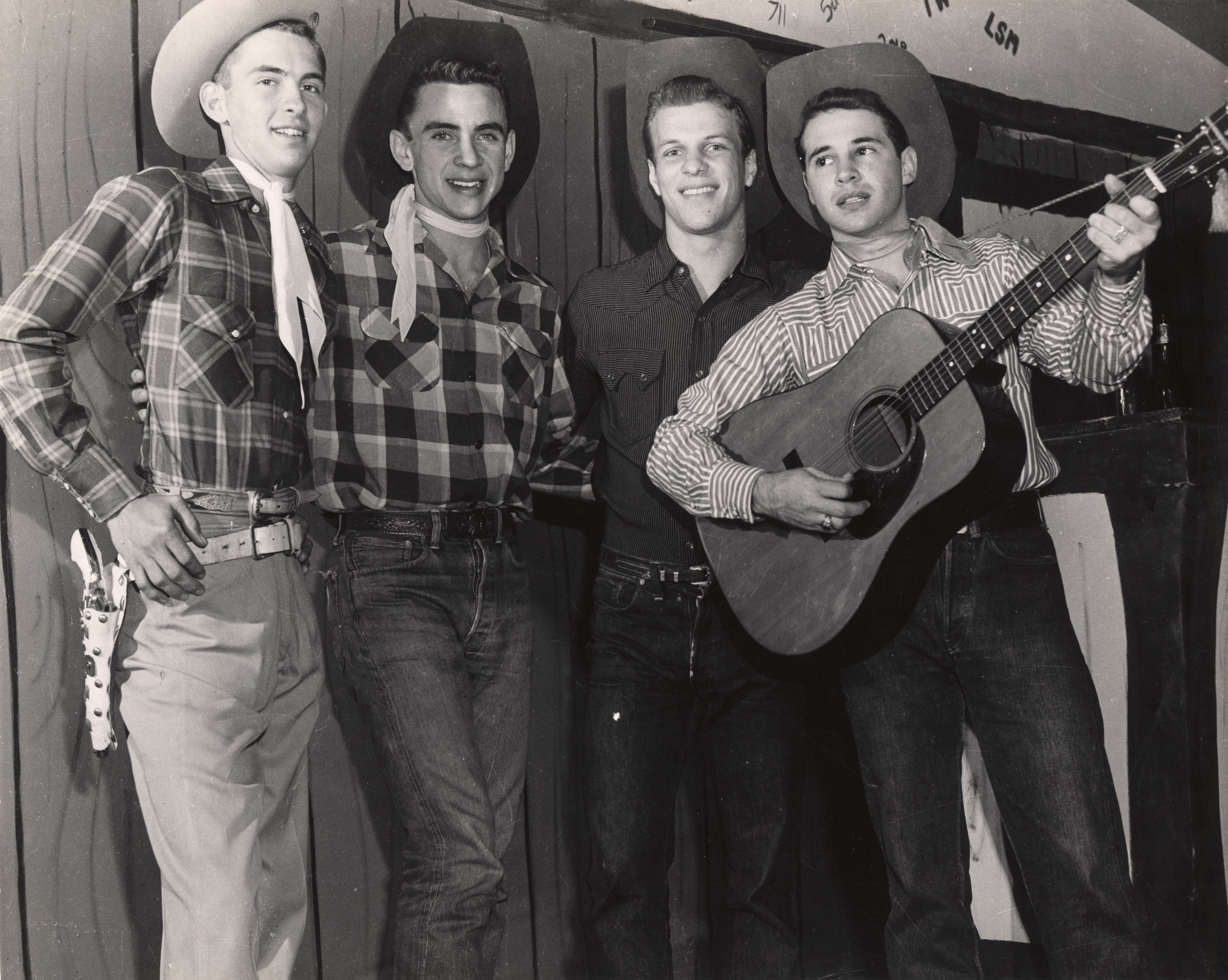
Texan folk costume comprising cowboy hats, jeans and checked western shirts (c. 1950)

Western wear is traditional dress in several areas of the United States, including Texas and the Southwest, and rural areas in the Midwest and the West. This attire, derived from Mexican vaquero and American pioneer garb, may include cowboy hats, Western shirts, cowboy boots, jeans, chaps, prairie skirts, and bolo ties.

Due to cold weather, clothing in northern areas—such as the Upper Midwest, Pacific Northwest, and northern New England—tends to include heavier materials. This may include flannel shirts or Buffalo plaid mackinaw jackets, and a knit cap or, in the case of the Upper Peninsula of Michigan, a Stormy Kromer cap. The attire of folk hero Paul Bunyan may represent this style.

In the Deep South, traditional attire includes white seersucker suits and string ties for men, and sun hats and large Southern belle-style dresses for women. The Cajun people of Louisiana traditionally wear the colorful capuchon for Mardi Gras celebrations. Historically, Creole women wore the tignon, mostly in plain or madras fabrics; it is now sometimes worn for heritage events or for cultural reasons. Gullah communities in the South Carolina Lowcountry and the Sea Islands preserve the traditional African-style clothing and culture.

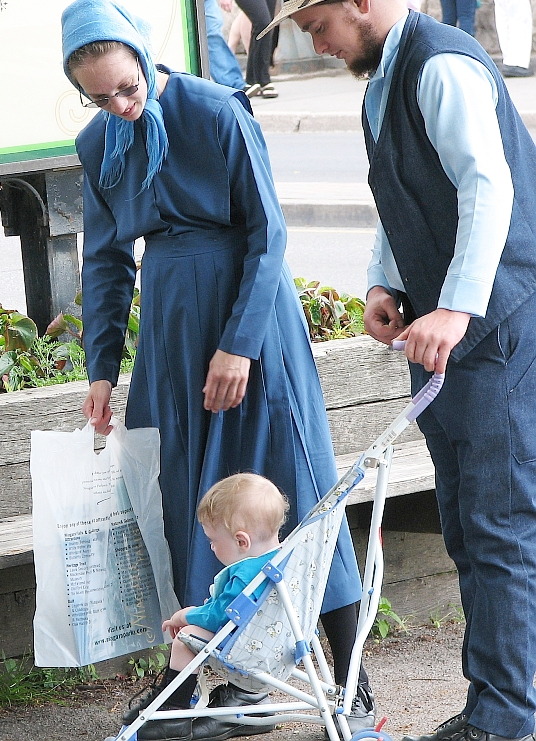
An Amish family in traditional plain dress

Summer residents of Nantucket will often wear Nantucket Reds. In Utah, Mormons may dress in 19th-century pioneer clothing for Mormon Trail–related activities and events. The Amish (mostly found in Pennsylvania, Ohio and Indiana) follow a style of plain dress.

=== South America ===
==== Argentina ====
In Argentina, traditional folk attire is the gaucho costume. Each province has a specific design of poncho, with the poncho salteño being the most recognized.

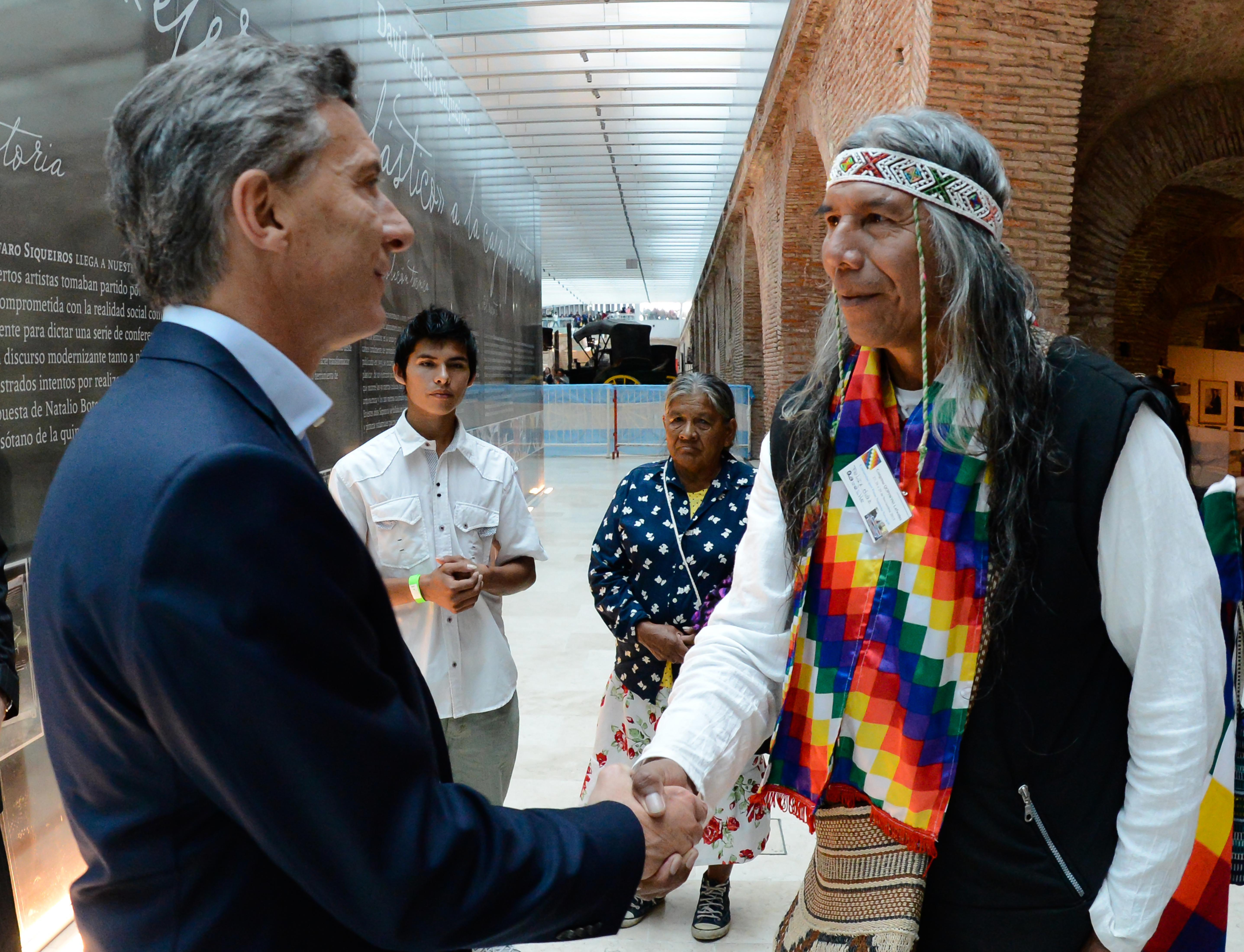
Félix Díaz, a Qom leader, meets with President Mauricio Macri wearing traditional dress

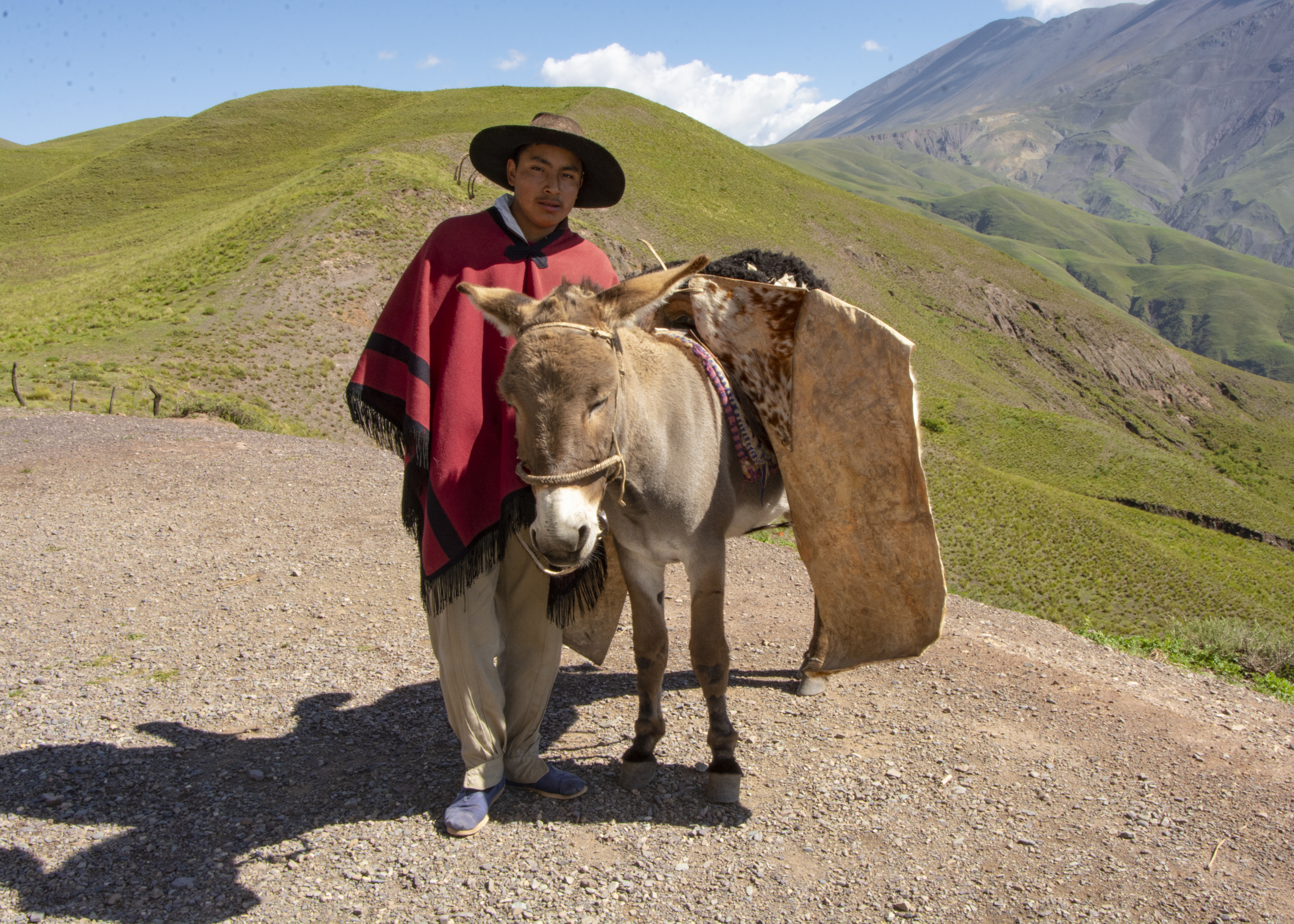
Argentinian man wearing Gaucho clothes

==== Bolivia ====
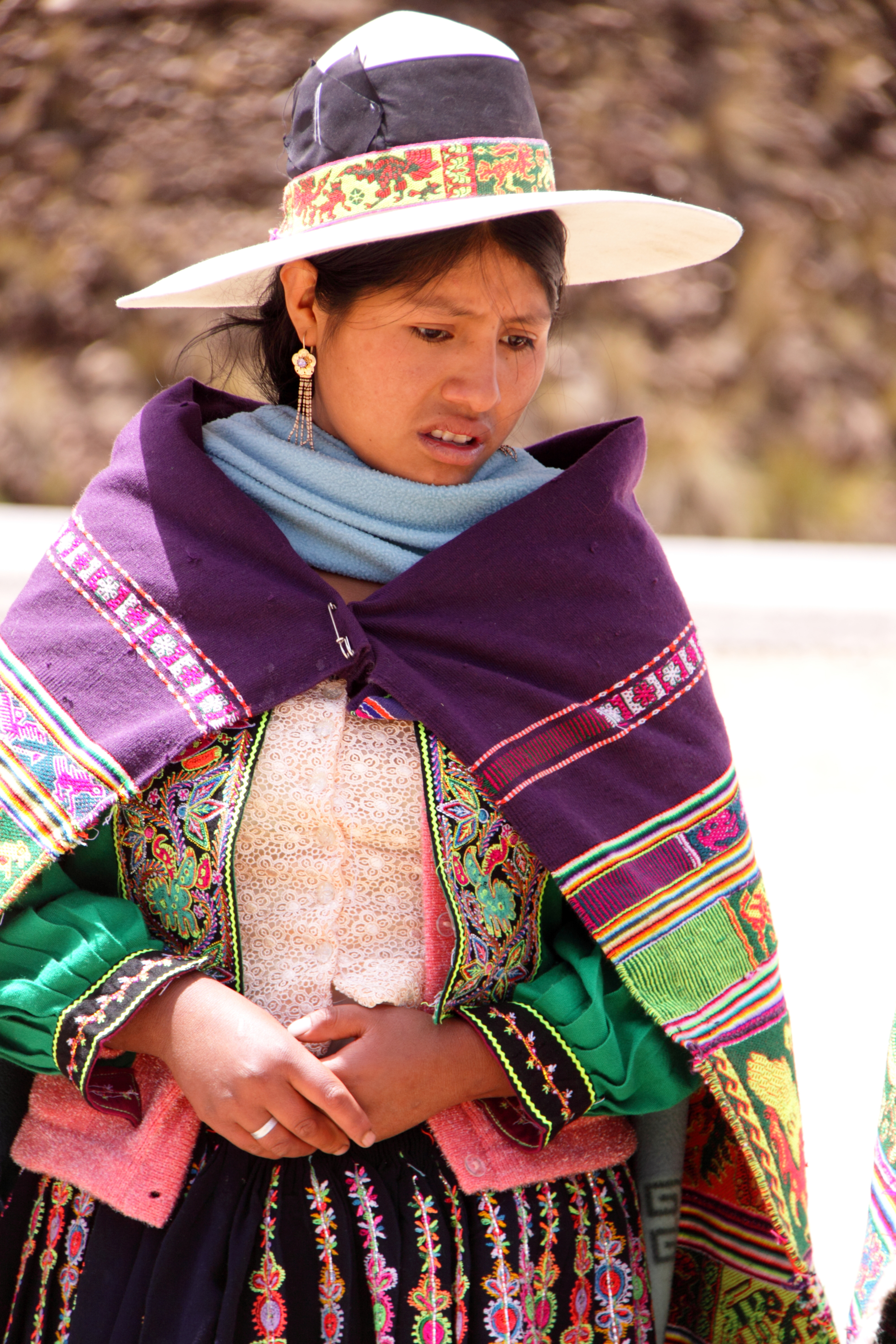
Indigenous woman in traditional dress near Cochabamba, Bolivia

In Bolivia, traditional clothing includes the poncho, chullo, and the Andean pollera.

==== Brazil ====
In Brazil, each region has its own traditional costume.

In many states within the Amazônia Legal region, Indigenous peoples wear traditional clothes specific to their ethnic groups. An example is the kushma, used by the Asháninka.

In Bahia, the traditional outfits are the baiana and abadá. In Rio de Janeiro, samba costumes are worn during the four days of Brazilian Carnival by members of samba schools. Outside of Carnival, the most traditional men's attire is that of the malandro carioca ('carioca rascal') or sambista, which includes white pants, a striped shirt, a white jacket, and a straw hat. In São Paulo, Goiás, and nearby states, Caipiras (Brazilian country folk) preserve traditional folk styles of clothing, which are often imitated during festa junina celebrations. In Rio Grande do Sul, the traditional attire is the gaúcho costume. In Pará, the typical clothing is that associated with carimbó, a popular dance from northern Brazil. In the northeastern sertão, cangaceiro clothing is traditional.

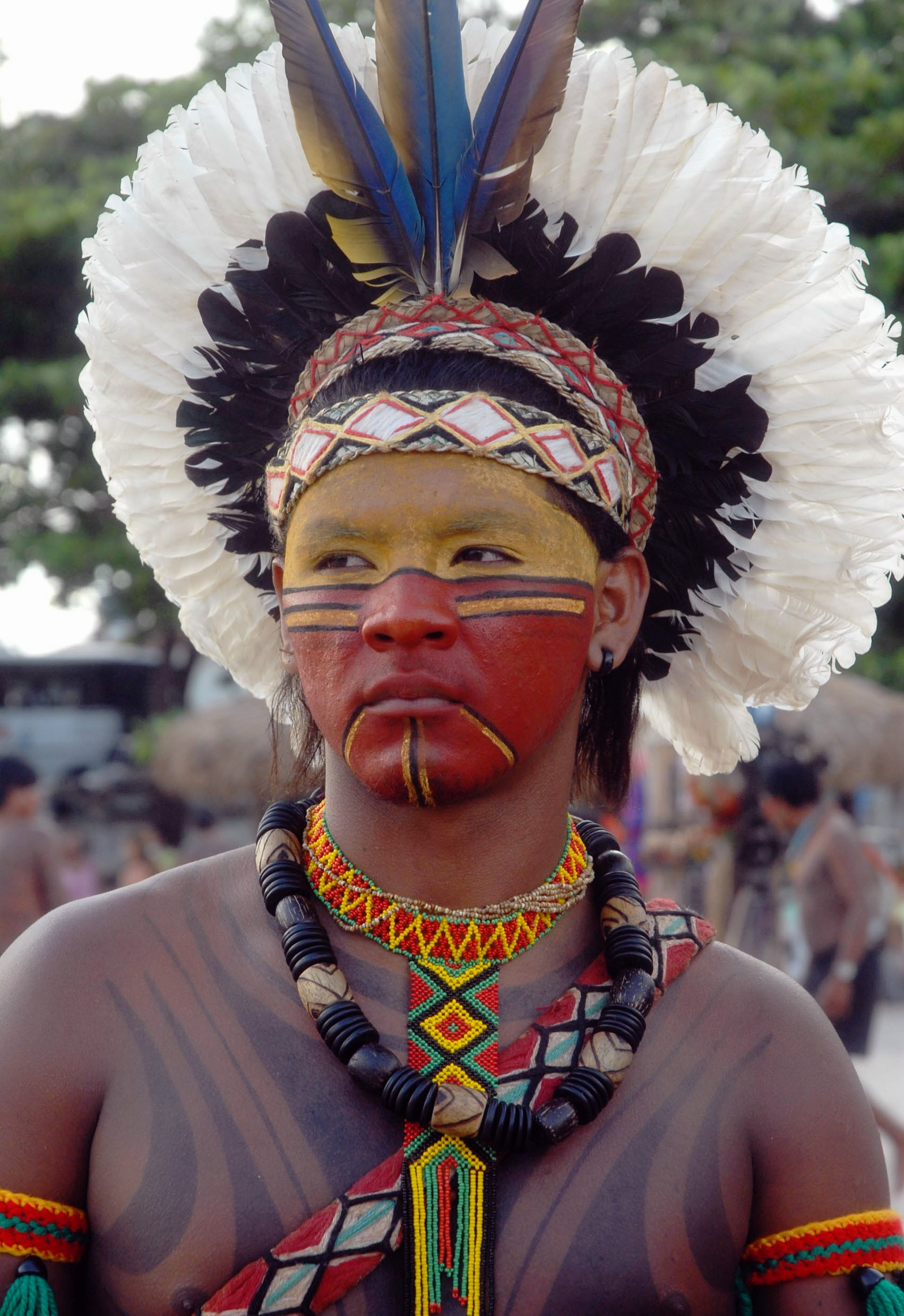
Pataxó man

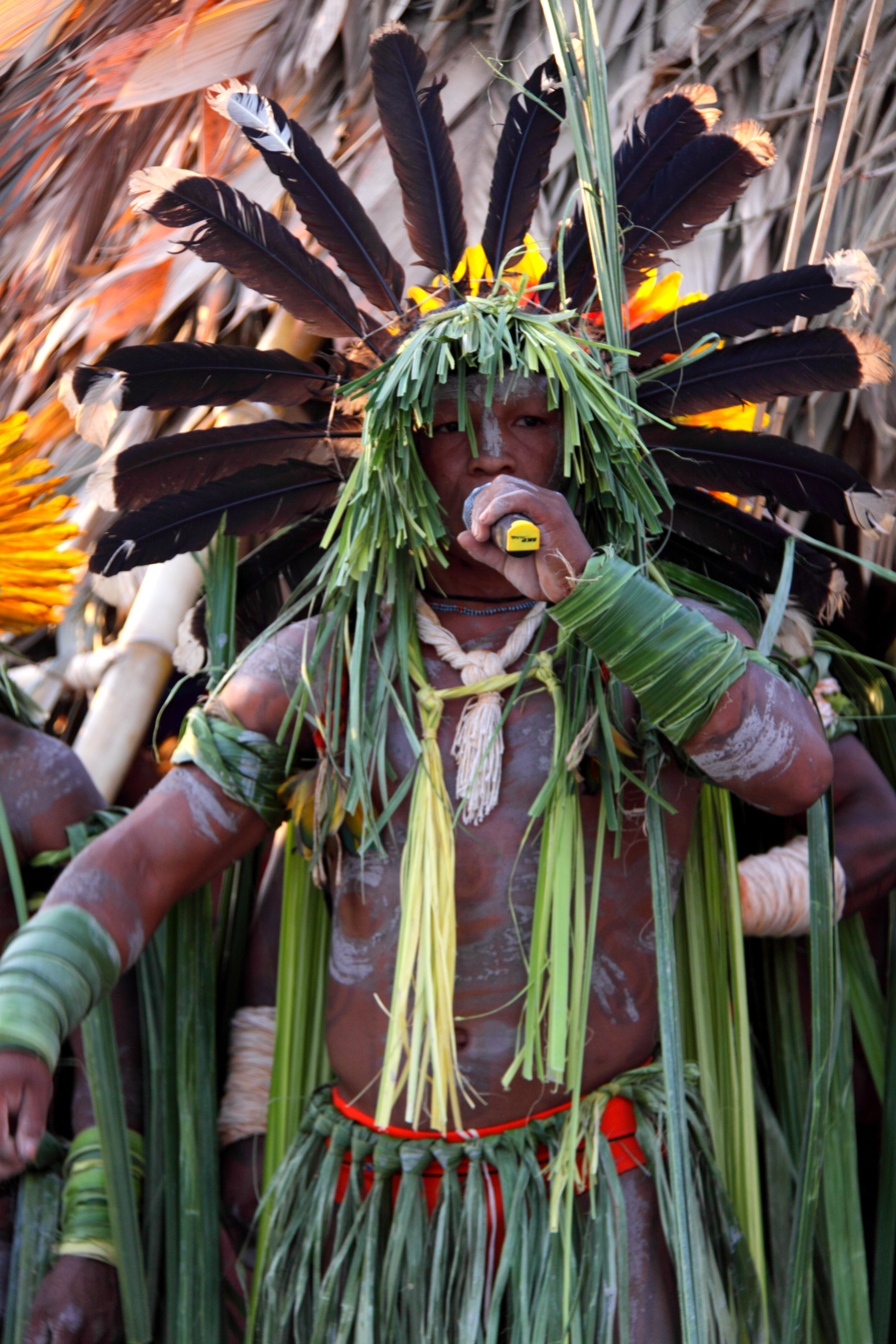
Enawene Nawe man

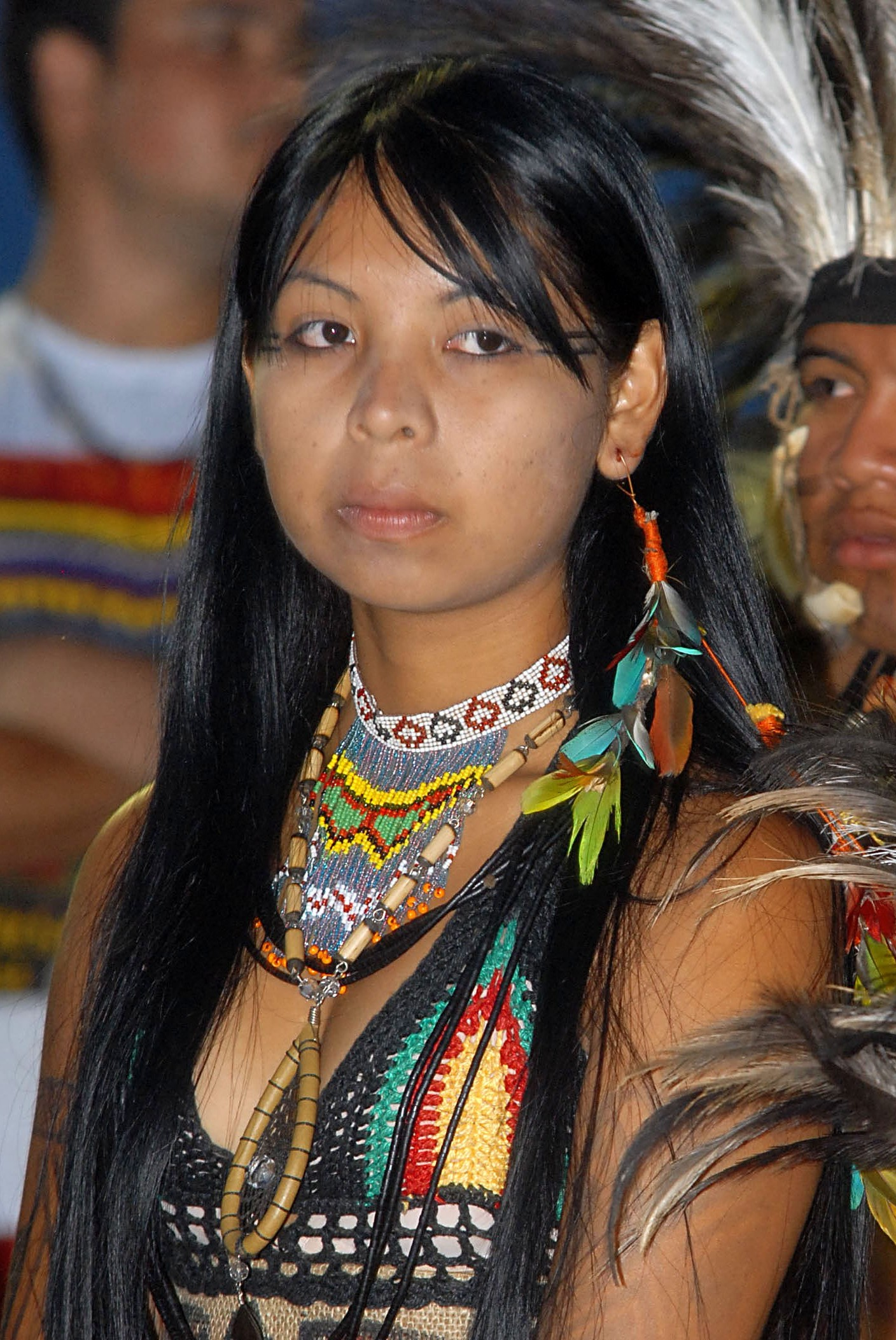
Terena woman

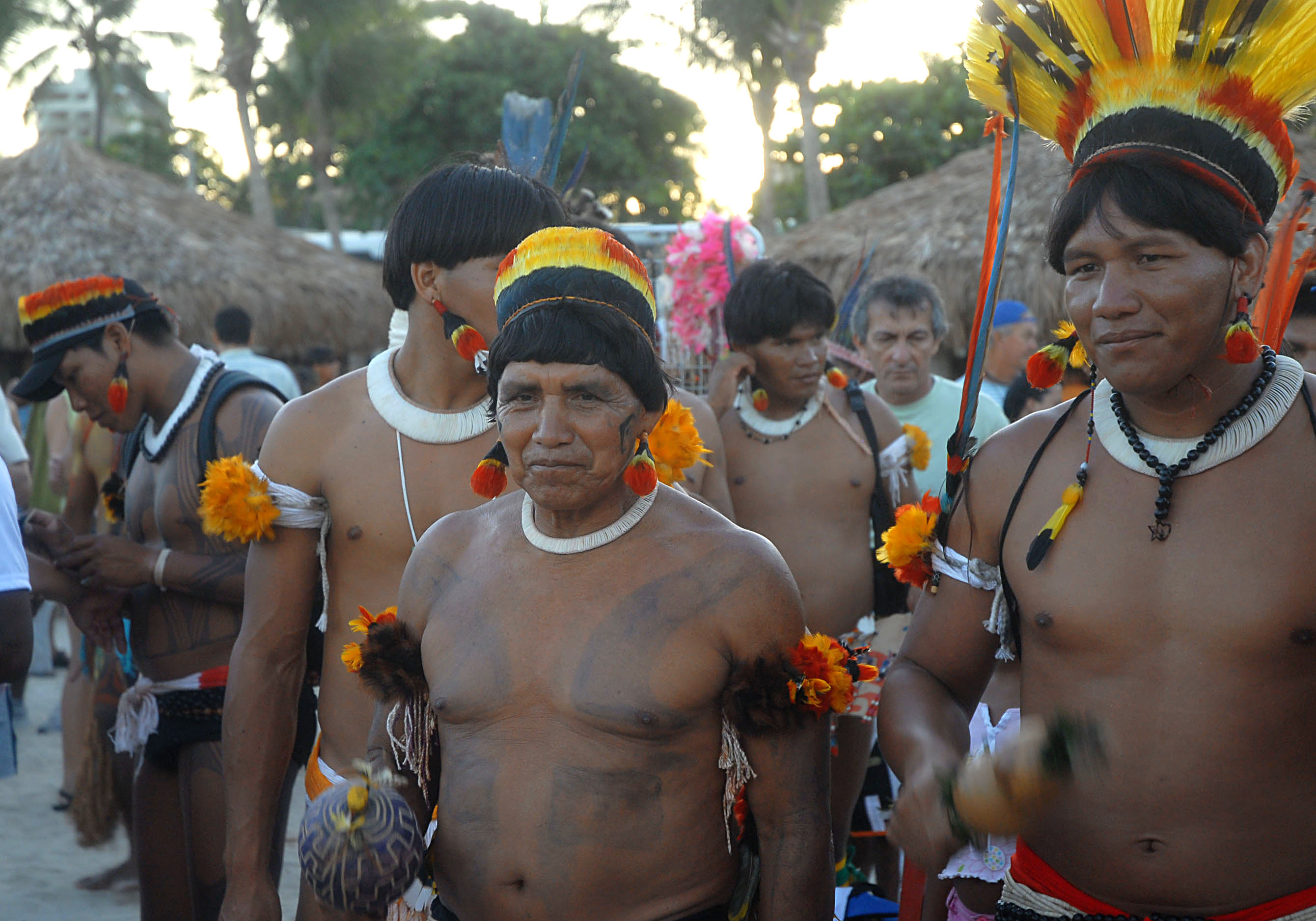
Kuikuro men

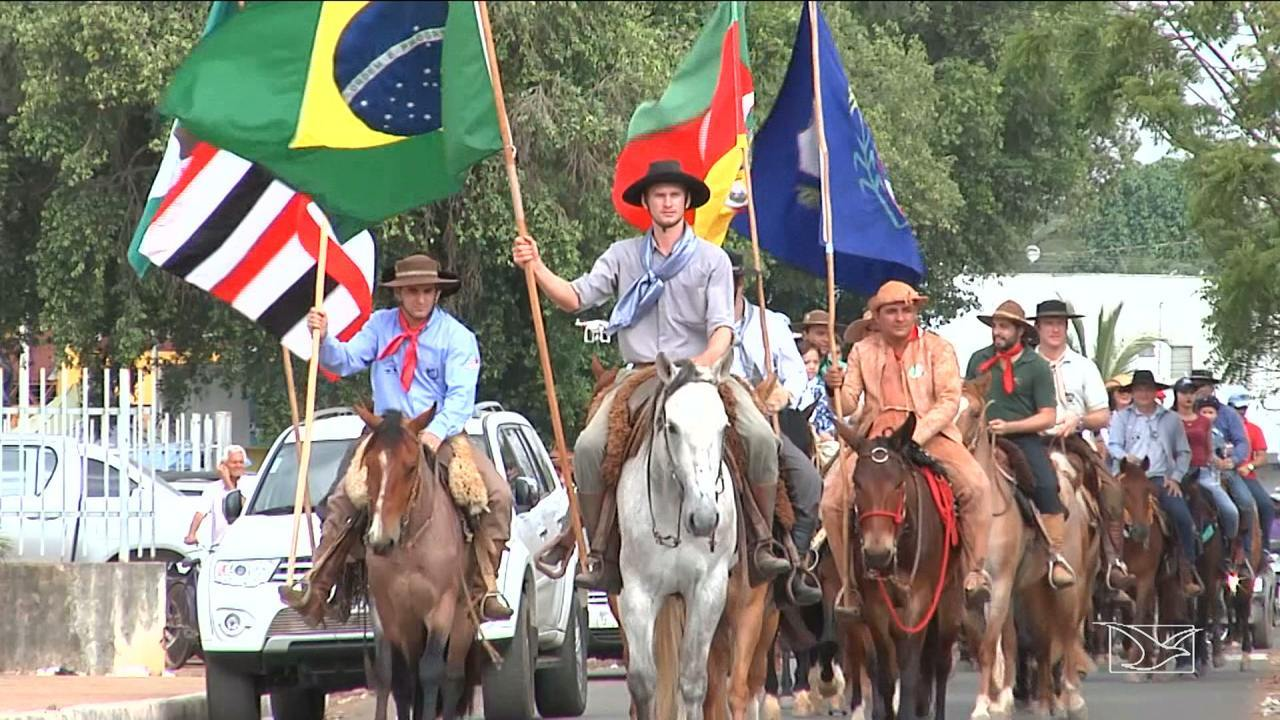
Brazilian gauchos from Rio Grande do Sul

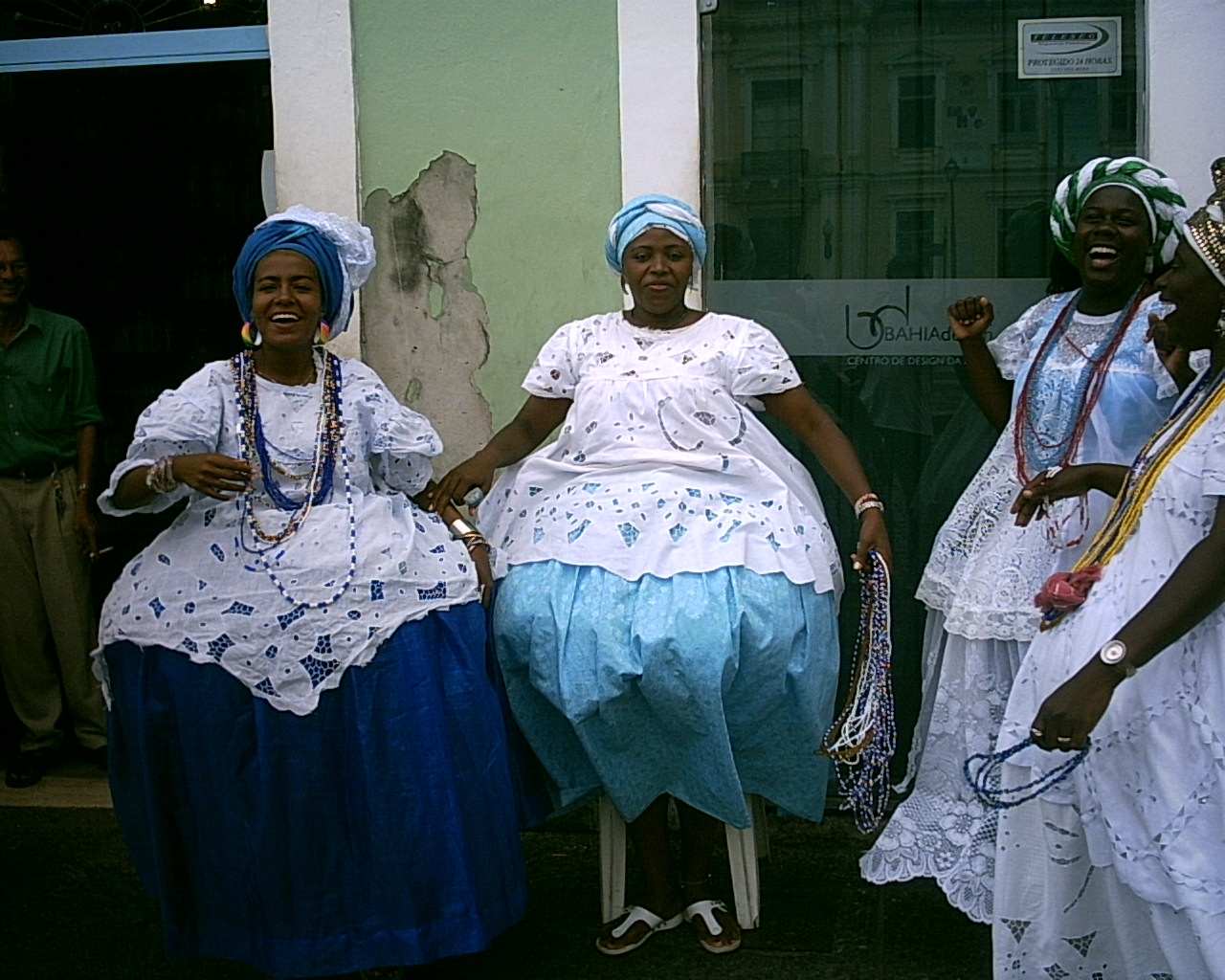
Women wearing baiana dresses in Salvador, Bahia

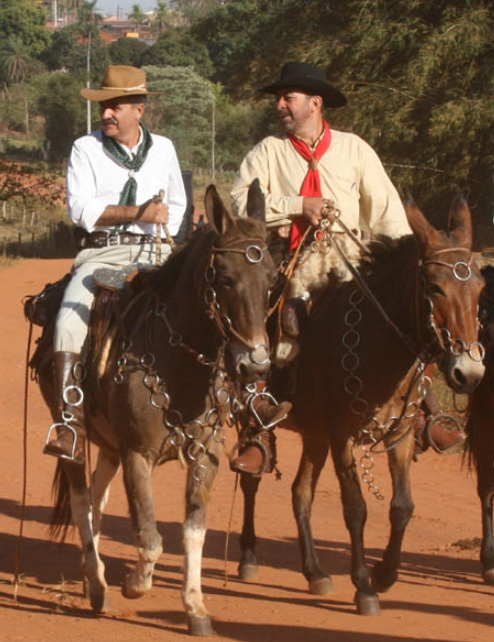
Caipira vaqueiros in traditional costumes in São Paulo.

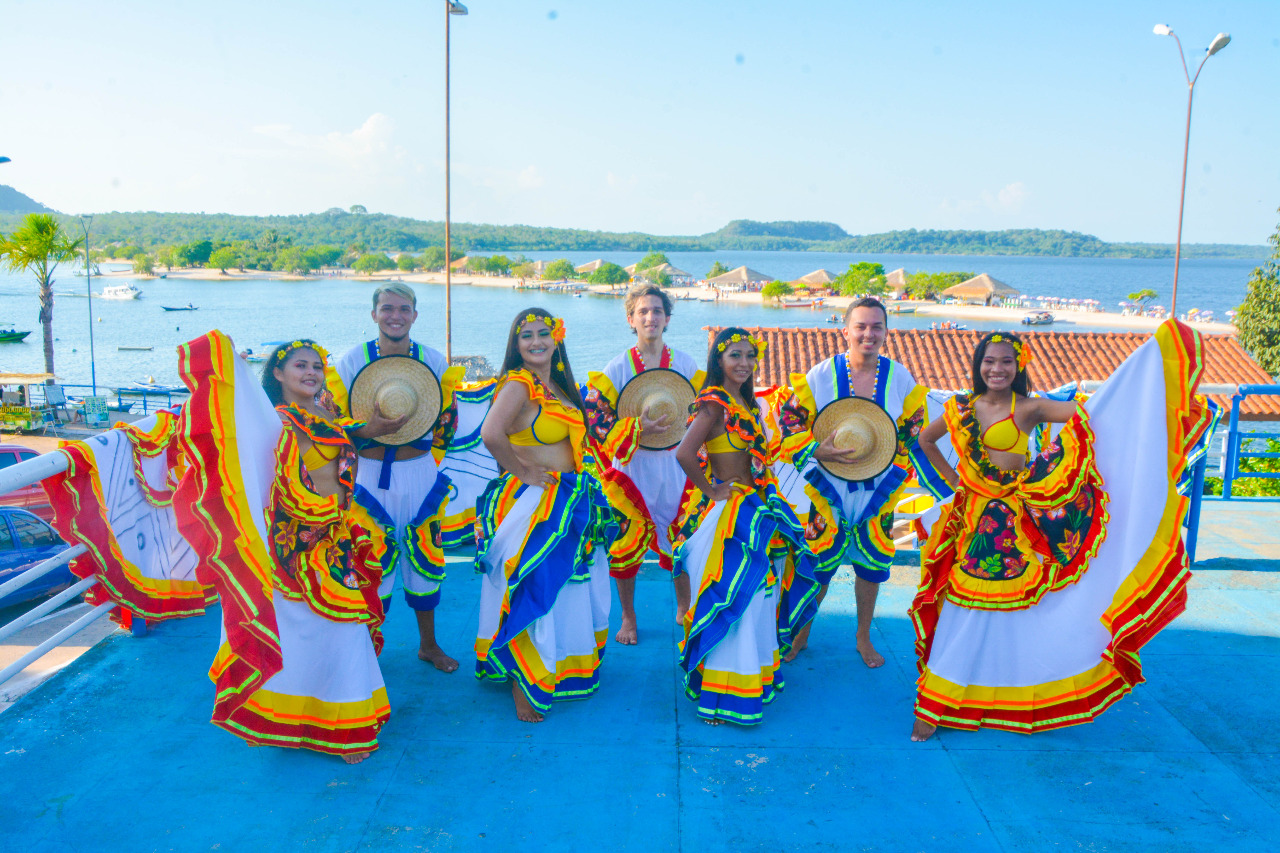
Group of Carimbó dancers from Santarém, Pará

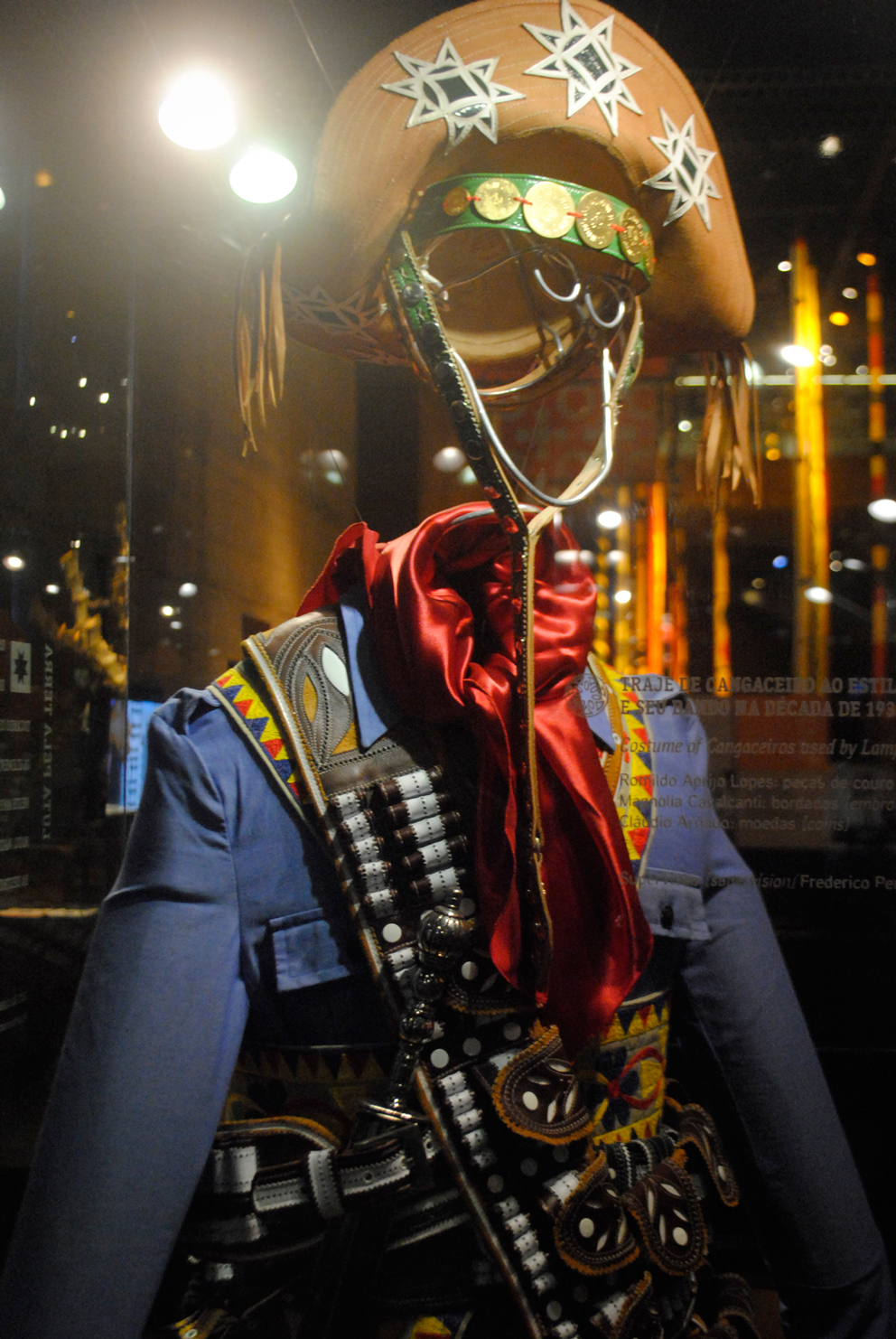
Cangaceiro clothing at the Cais do Sertão Museum, Recife, Pernambuco

==== Chile ====
In Chile, the traditional attire is the huaso costume, which includes a chamanto, chupalla, and poncho.

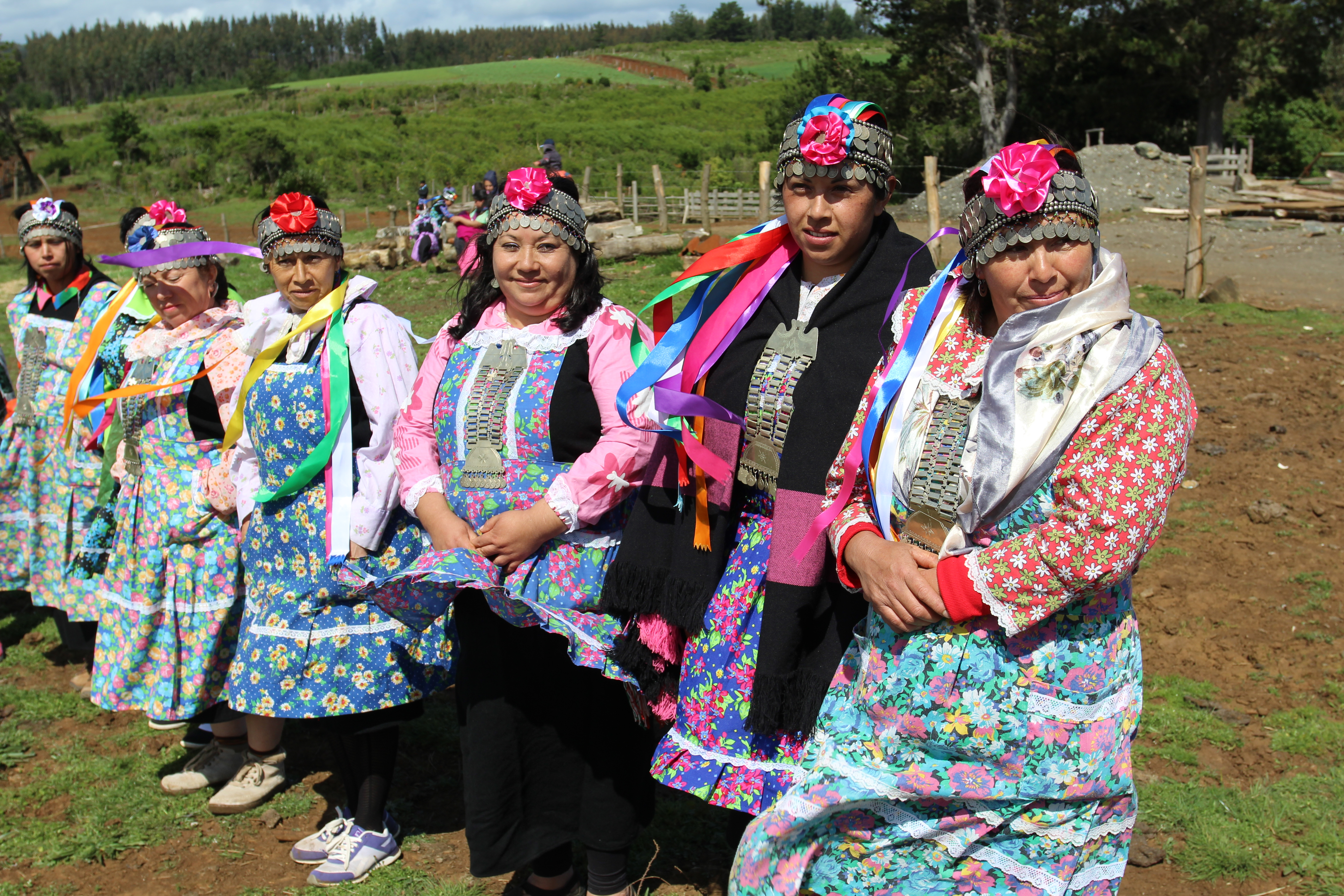
Mapuche women from Tirúa (2015)

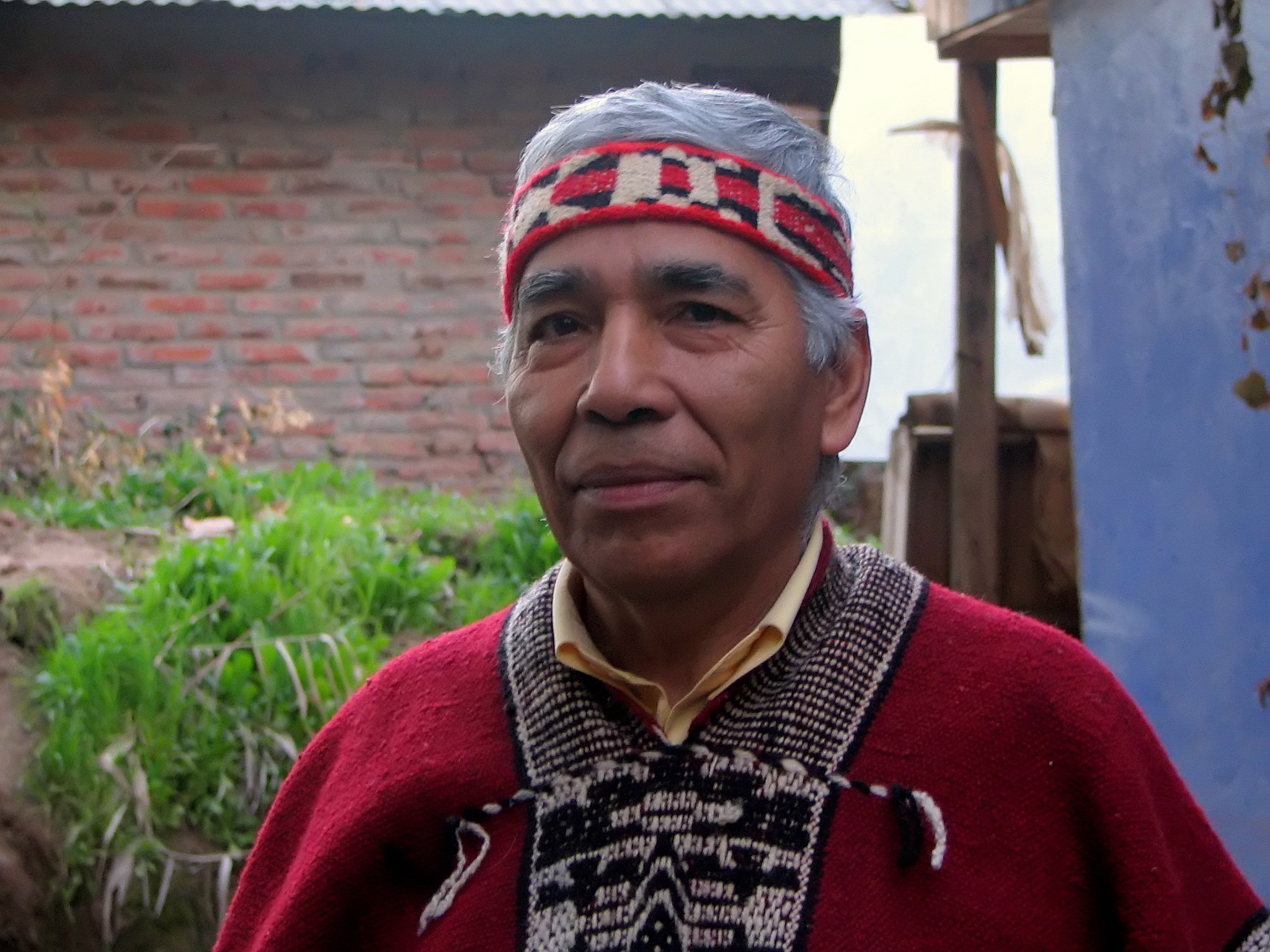
Mapuche man in Chile (2007)

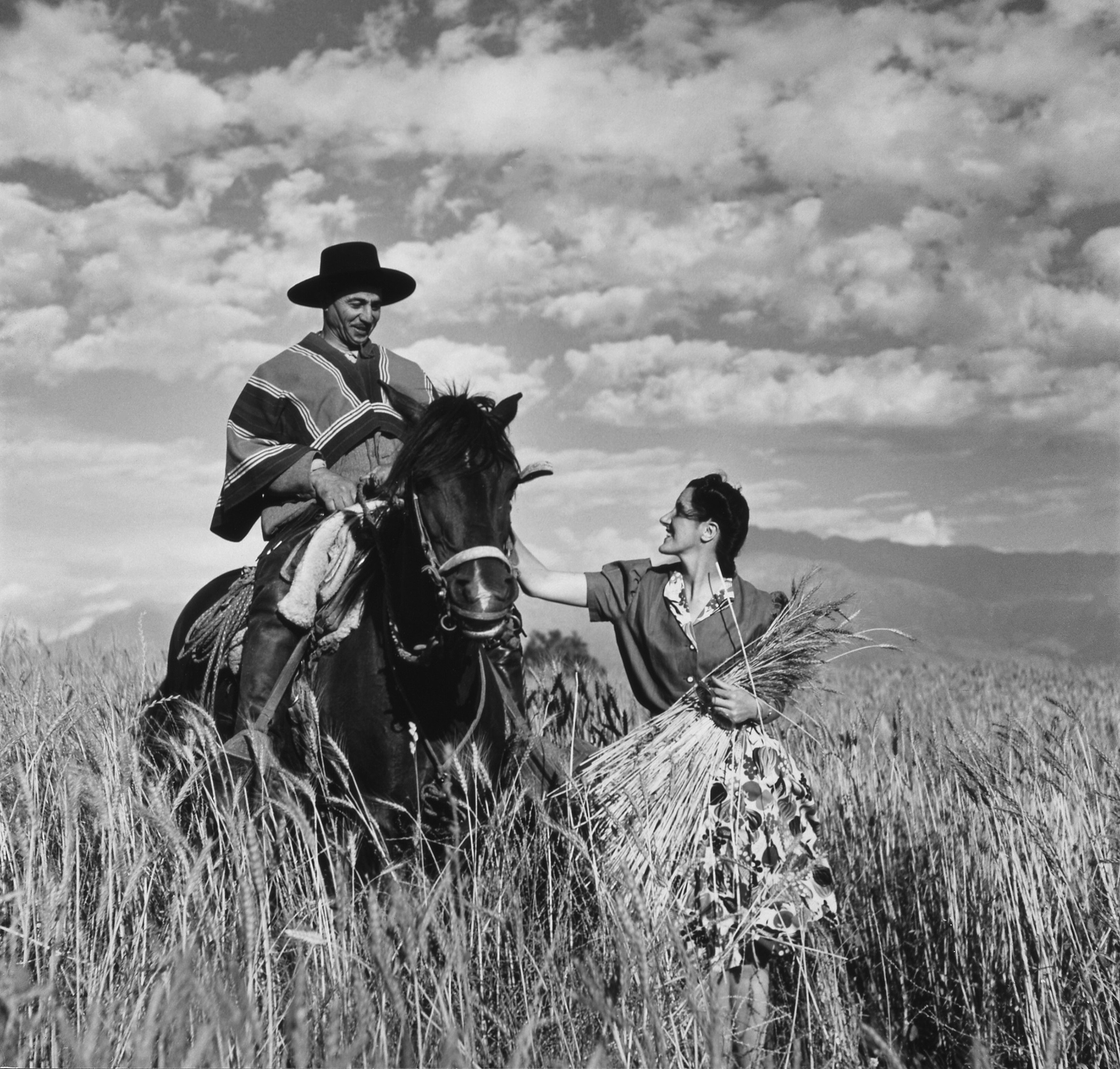
Chilean huaso man wearing a chupalla and chamanto (1940)

==== Colombia ====
Each region in Colombia has a distinct costume. Traditional male attire includes the sombrero vueltiao, ruana, white shirt, trousers, and alpargatas. Women's attire includes a blouse, cumbia pollera, sombrero vueltiao, and alpargatas.

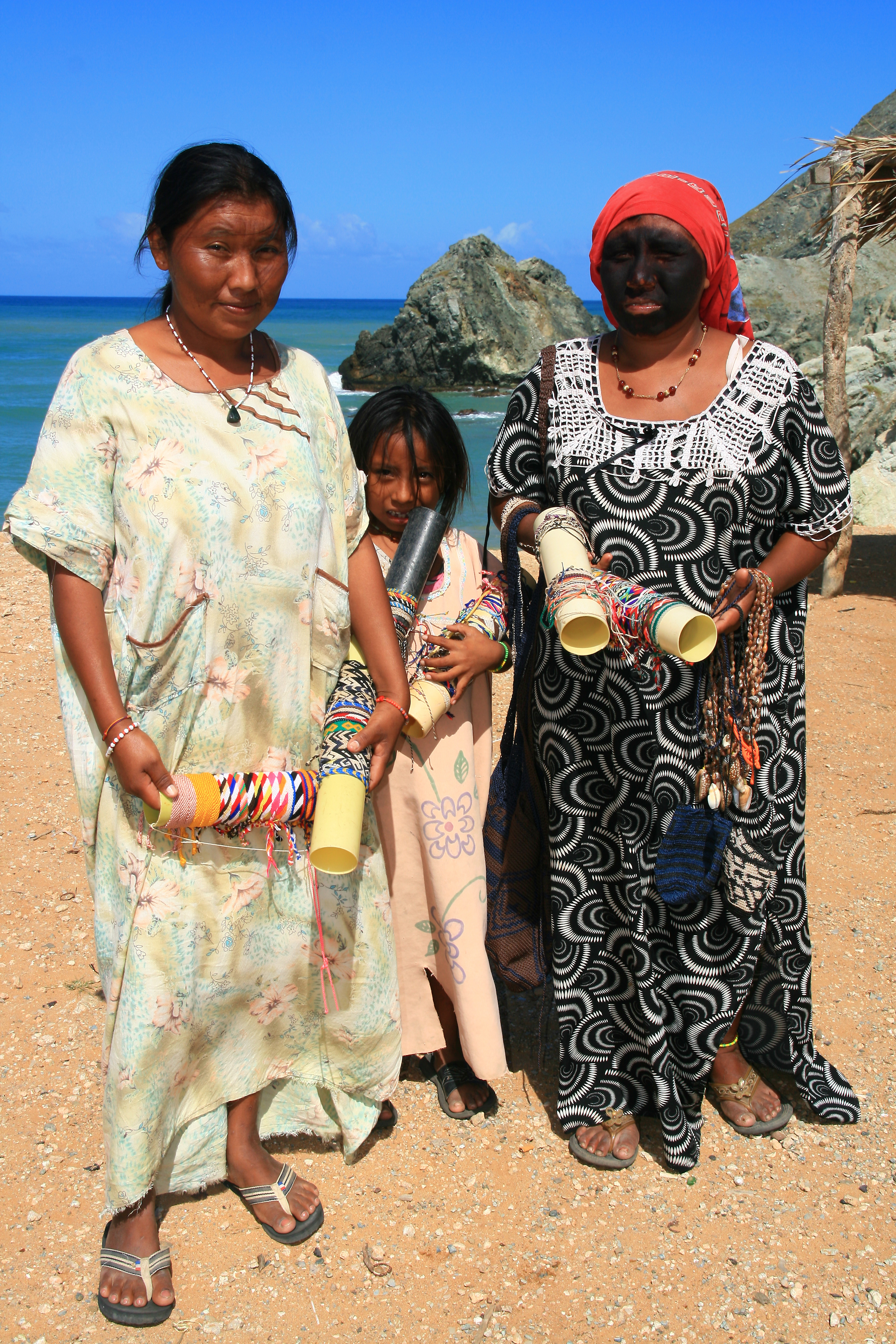
Wayuu women in the Guajira Peninsula, which comprises Colombia and Venezuela

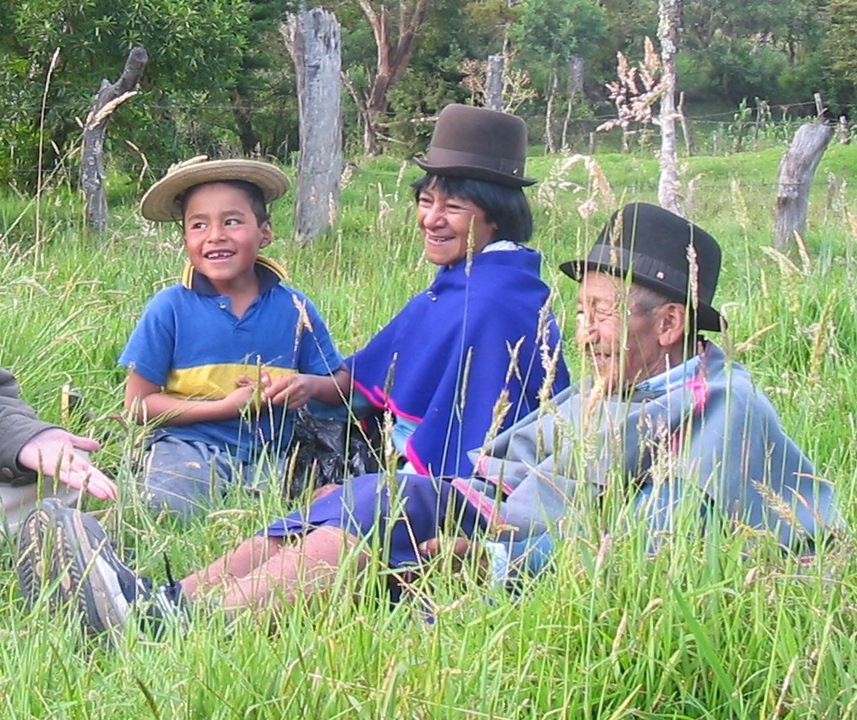
Guambía people relaxing in Colombia

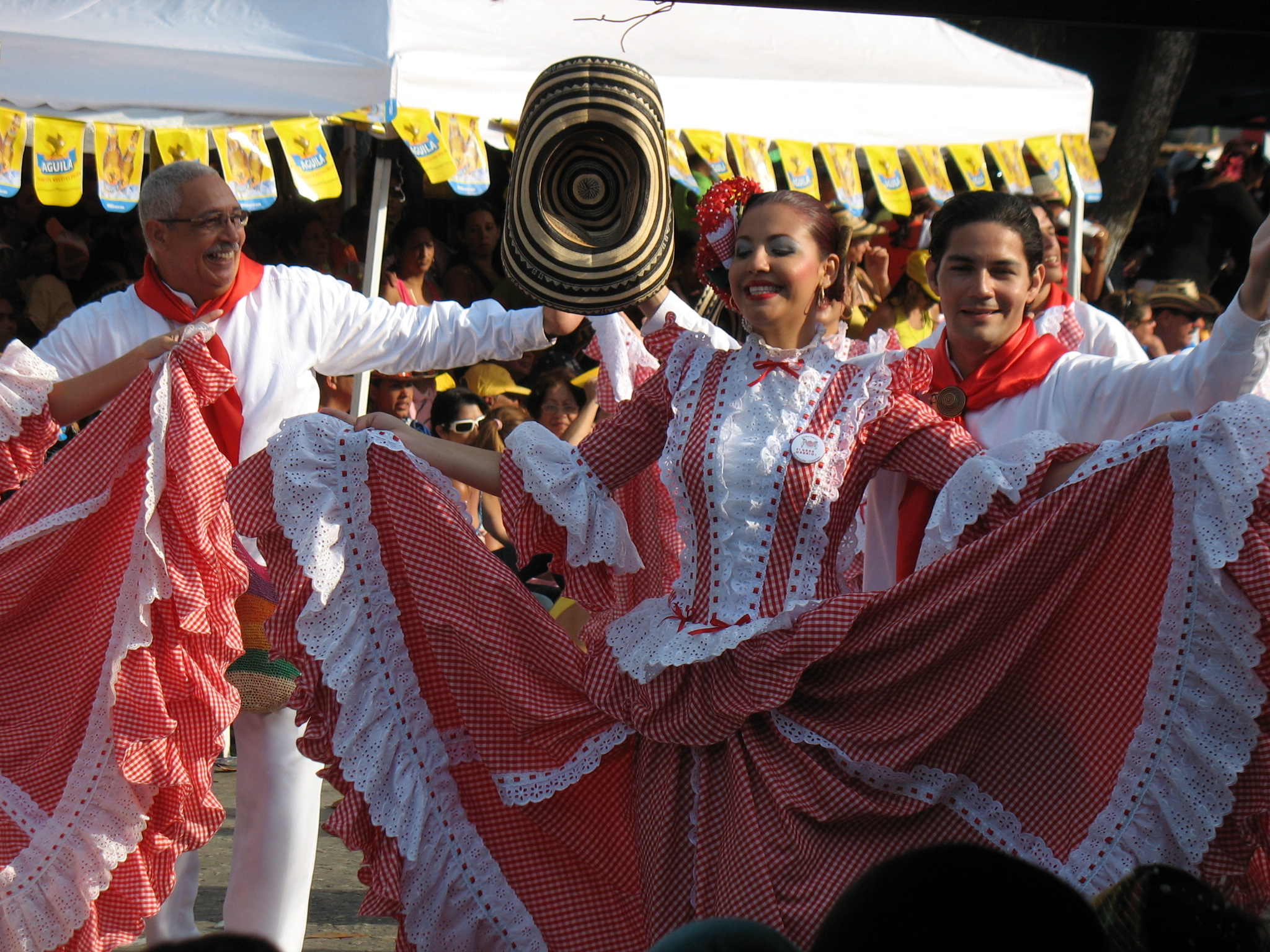
Cumbia dancer holding a sombrero vueltiao

==== Ecuador ====
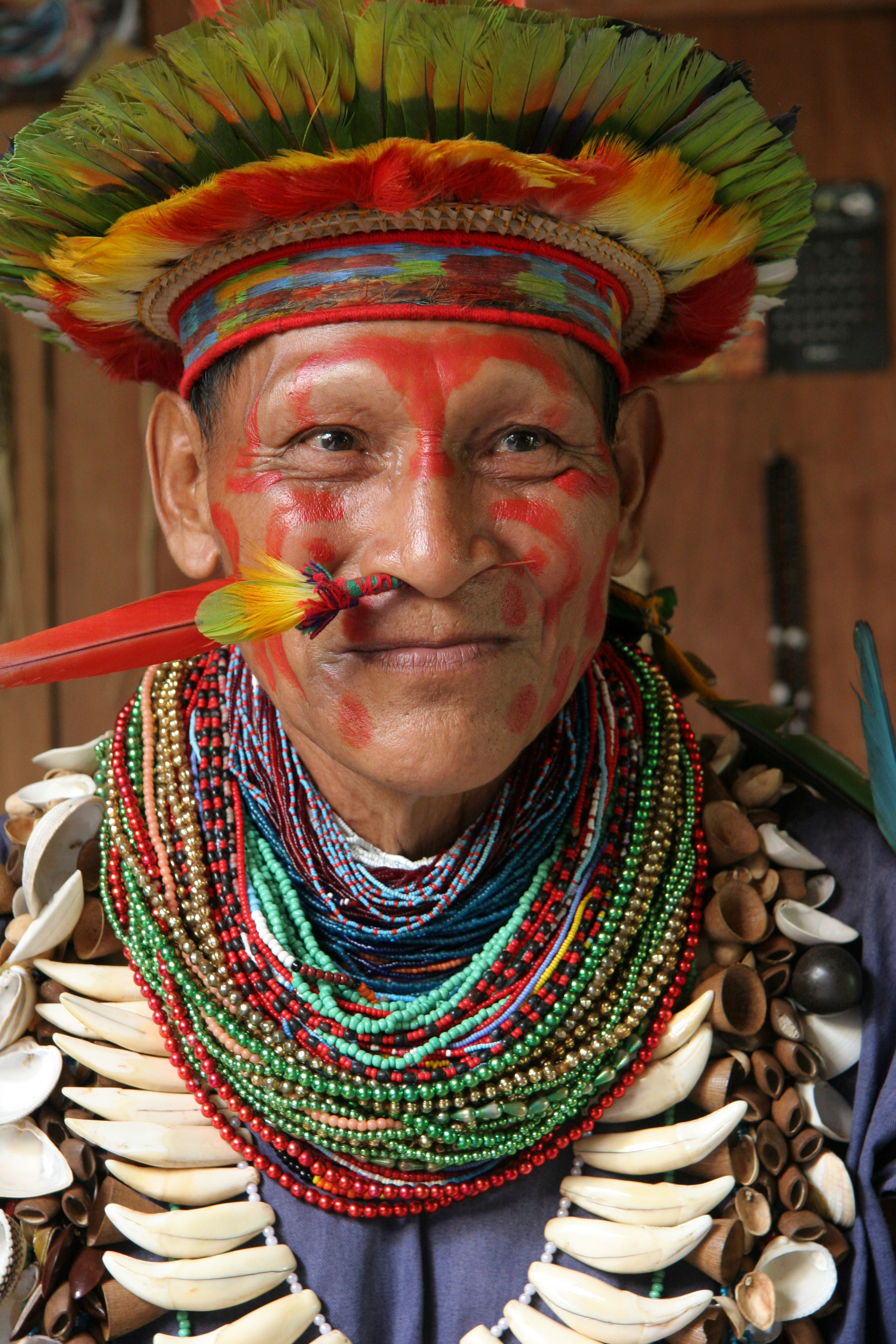
Shaman of the Cofán people from the Amazon rainforest in present-day Ecuador

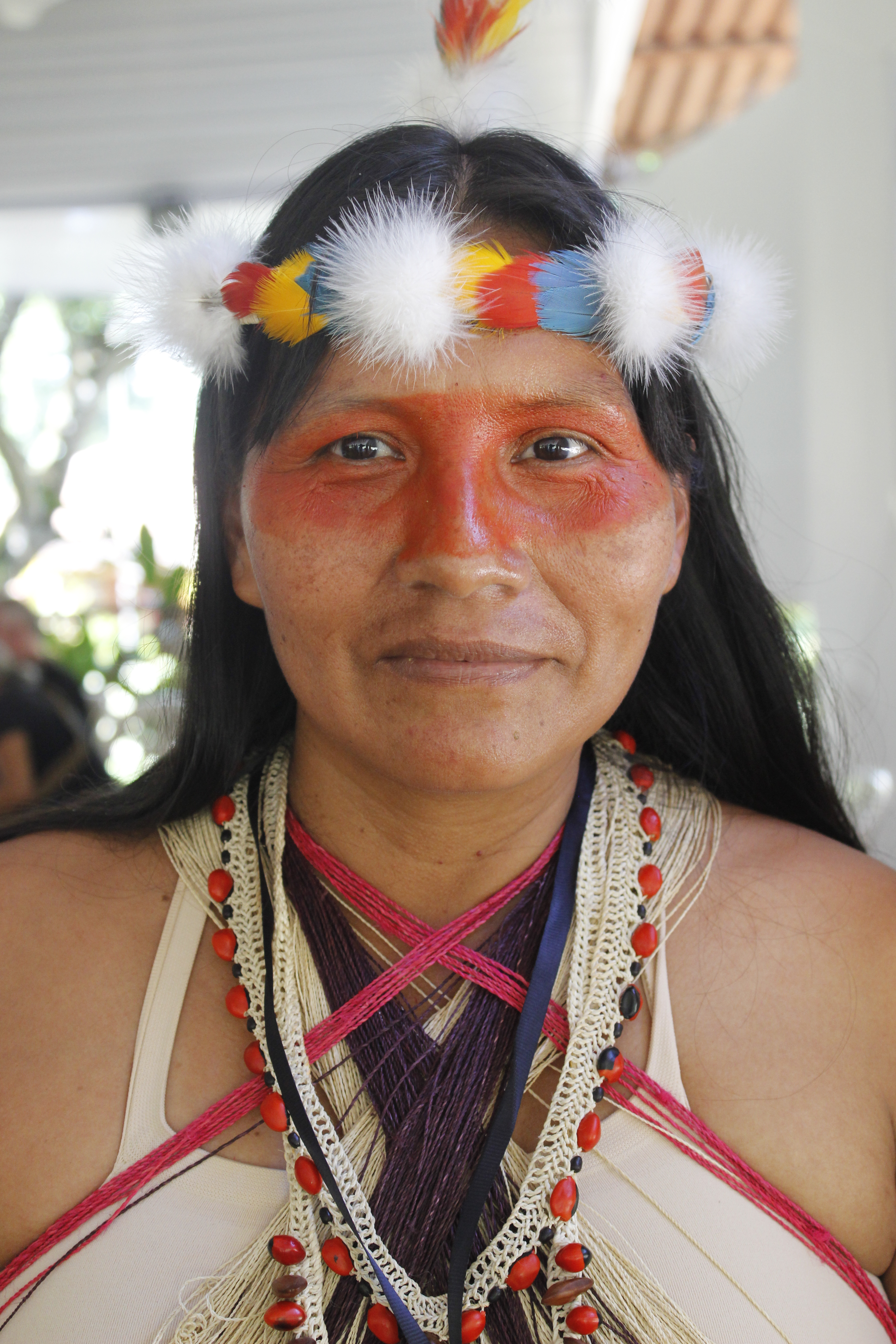
Alicia Cawiya, vice-president of the Huaorani Nation of Ecuador, in traditional dress

In Ecuador, traditional clothing includes the poncho and Panama hat.

==== Guyana ====
Guyana does not have a designated style of national dress. Each ethnic group wears its cultural clothing during important events or occasions. Afro-Guyanese men typically wear a dashiki or shirt jacket, and women wear a booboo. Indo-Guyanese men wear a kurta, sherwani, or churidar, while women wear a sari or lehenga. Each indigenous tribe wears its tribal clothing during cultural events or important occasions.

==== Paraguay ====
In Paraguay, traditional clothing includes the ao po'i.

==== Peru ====
In Peru, traditional attire includes the chullo, poncho, and Andean pollera.

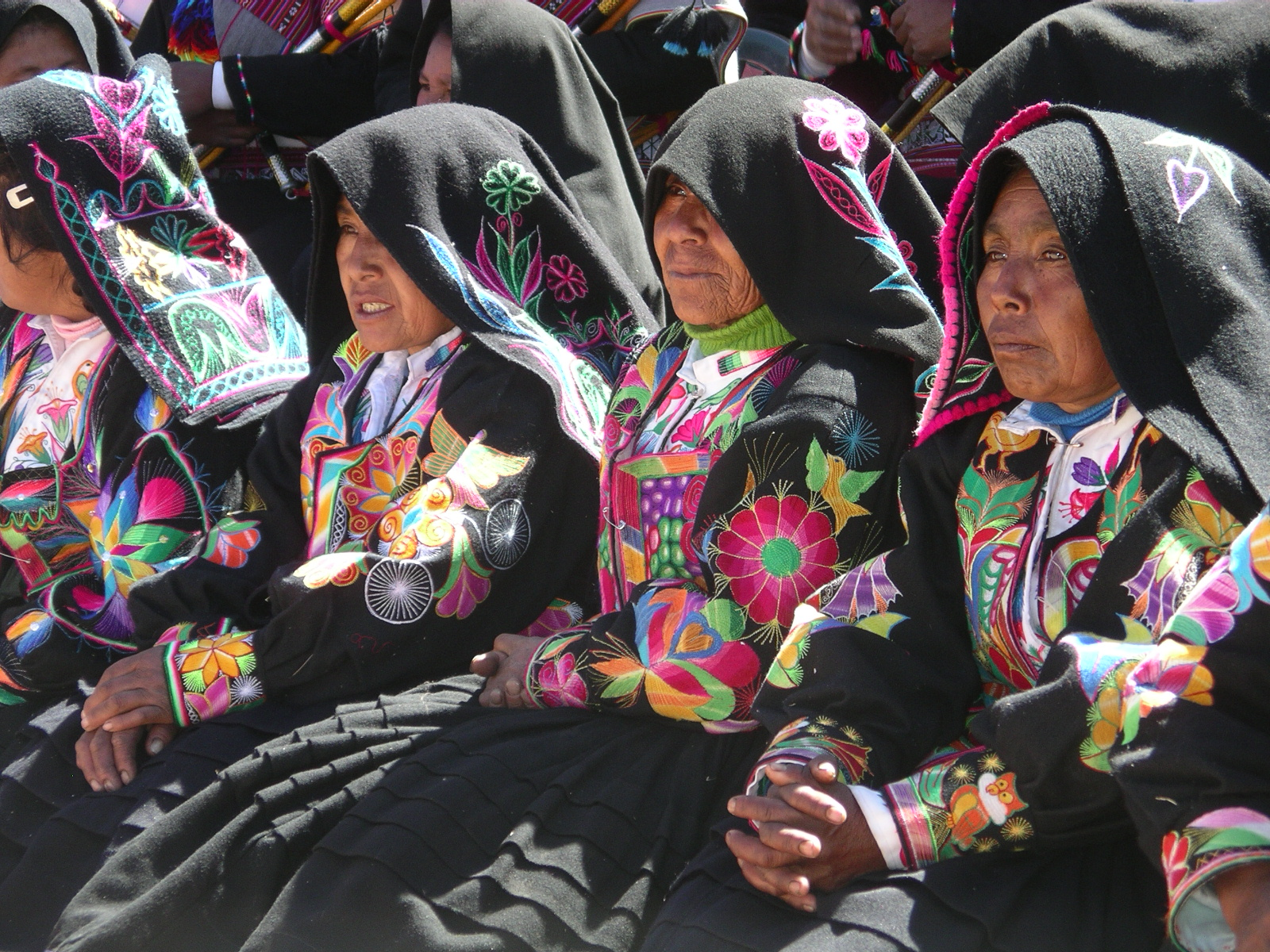
Quechua women in festive dress on Taquile Island, Lake Titicaca, Peru

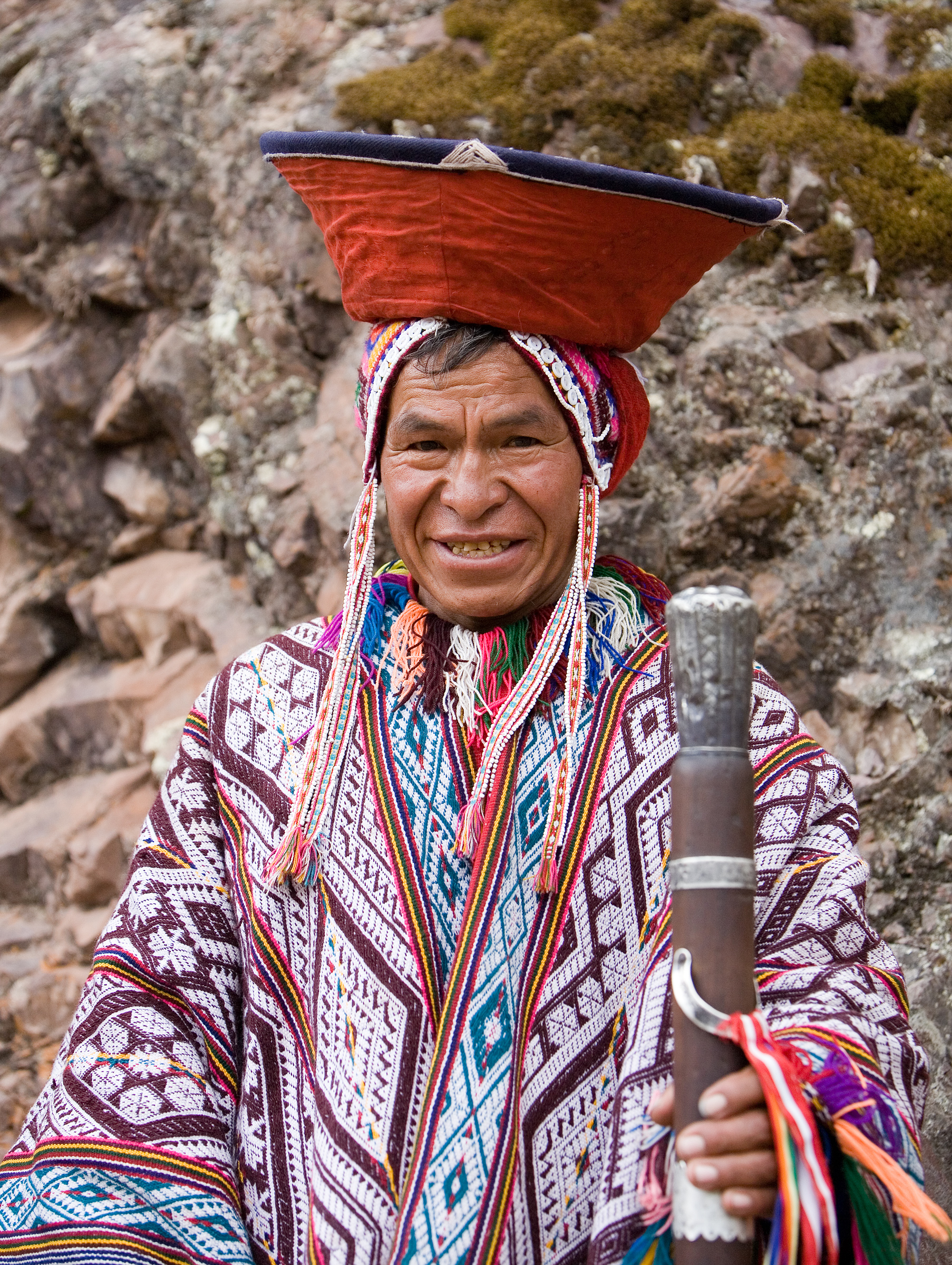
A Peruvian man in traditional dress

==== Suriname ====
In Suriname, traditional clothing includes the kotomisse and pangi cloth.

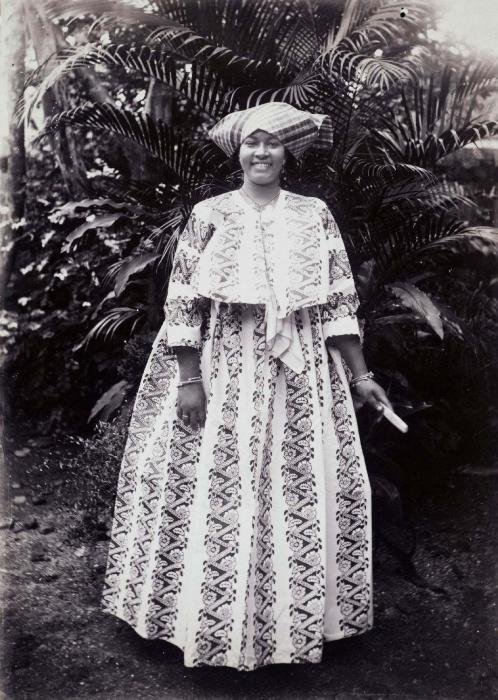
Surinamese woman wearing the traditional koto (c. 1910)

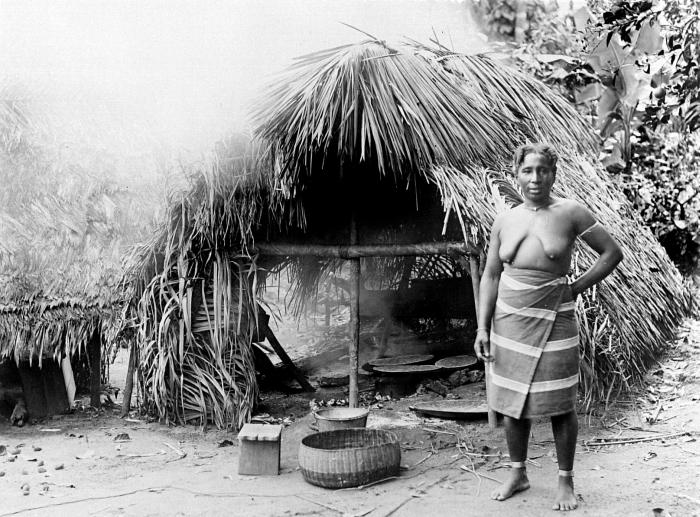
Maroon woman wearing a pangi in Suriname (ca. 1900–1910)

==== Other nations ====
In Uruguay, the traditional folk attire is the gaucho costume.

In Venezuela, traditional male attire is the llanero costume, which includes the liqui liqui and pelo e' guama hat. Traditional female attire includes the joropo dress and pelo e' guama hat.

== Asia ==
=== East Asia ===
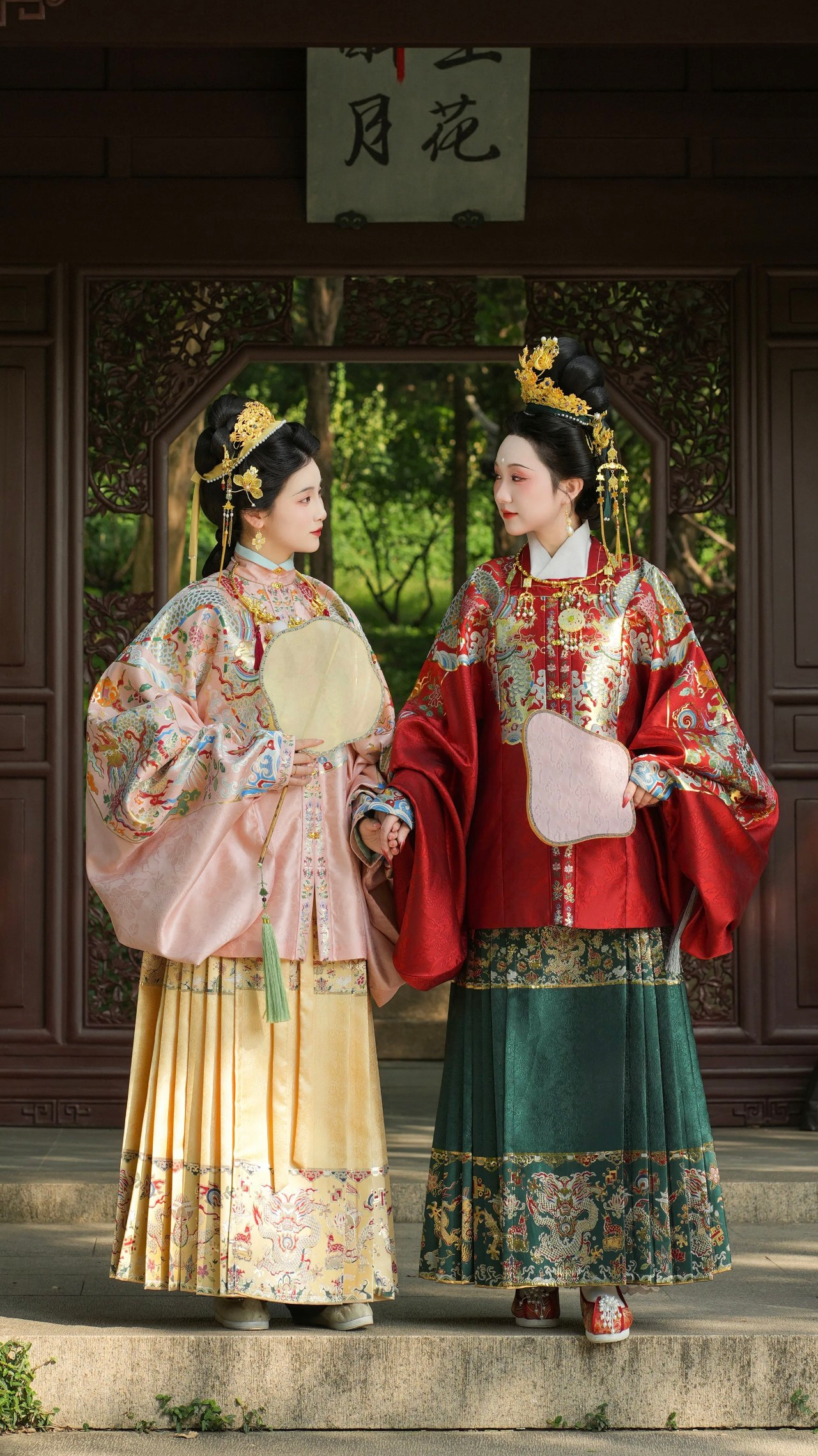
Chinese women wearing Hanfu

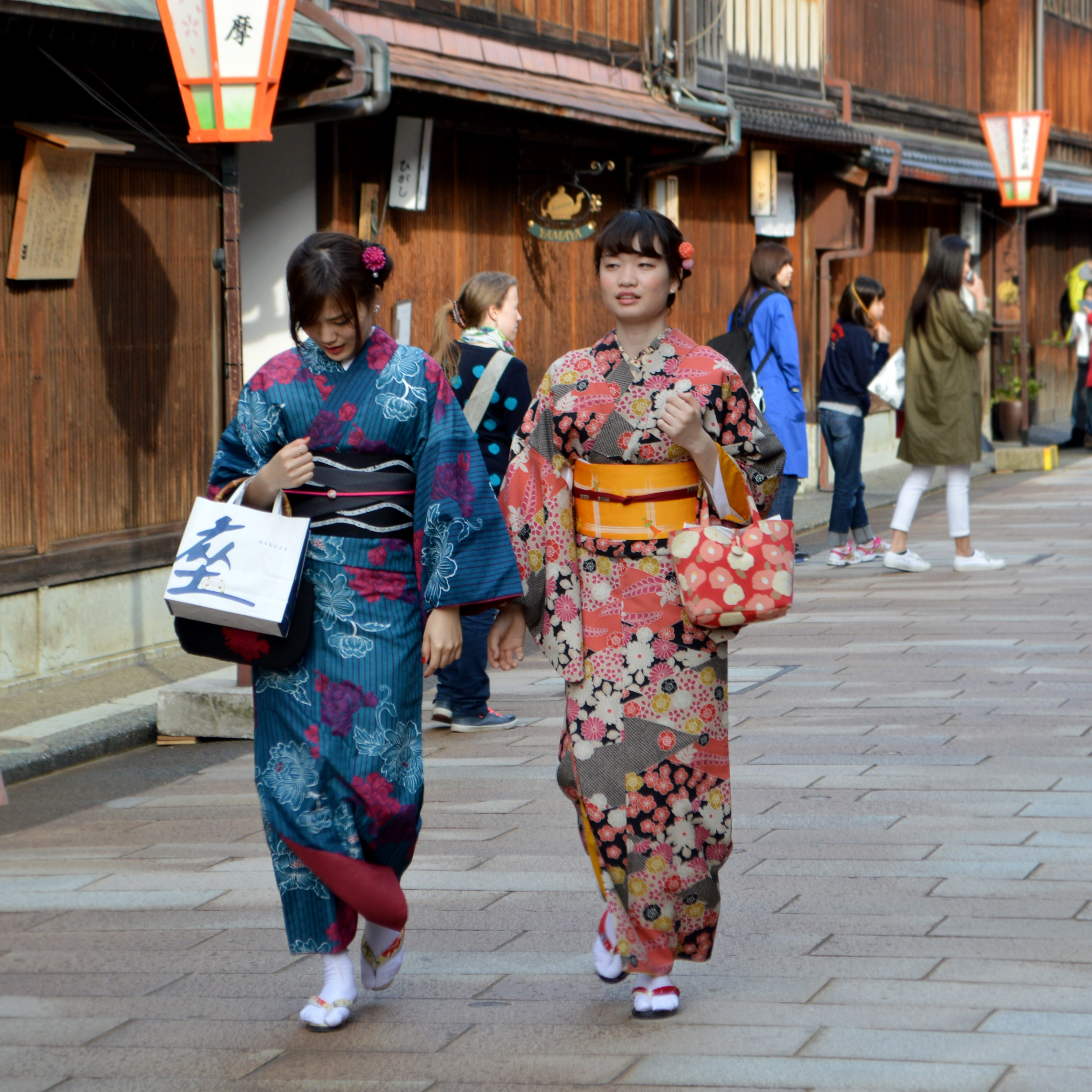
Women wearing Wafuku in Kanazawa

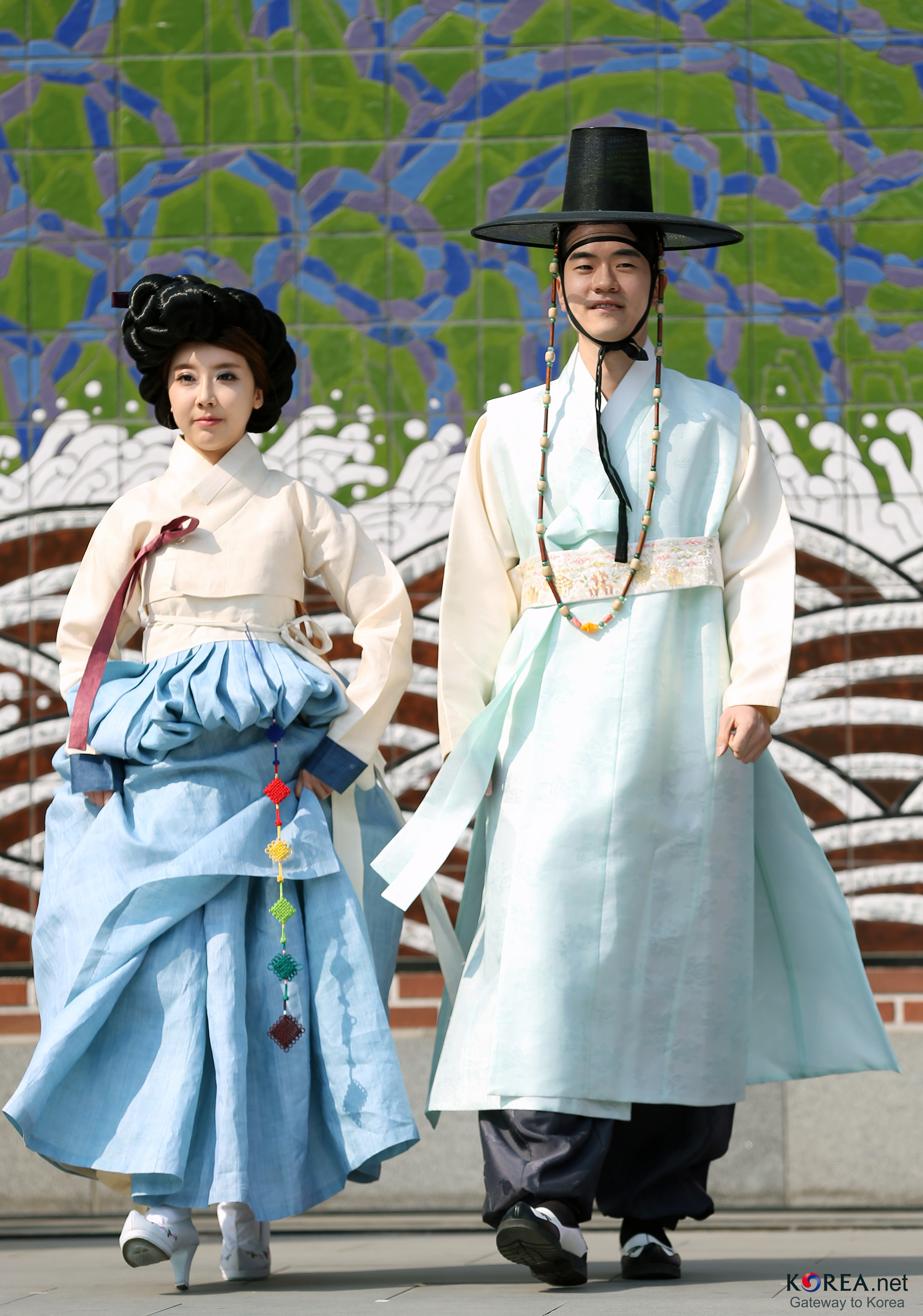
Korean wearing Hanbok

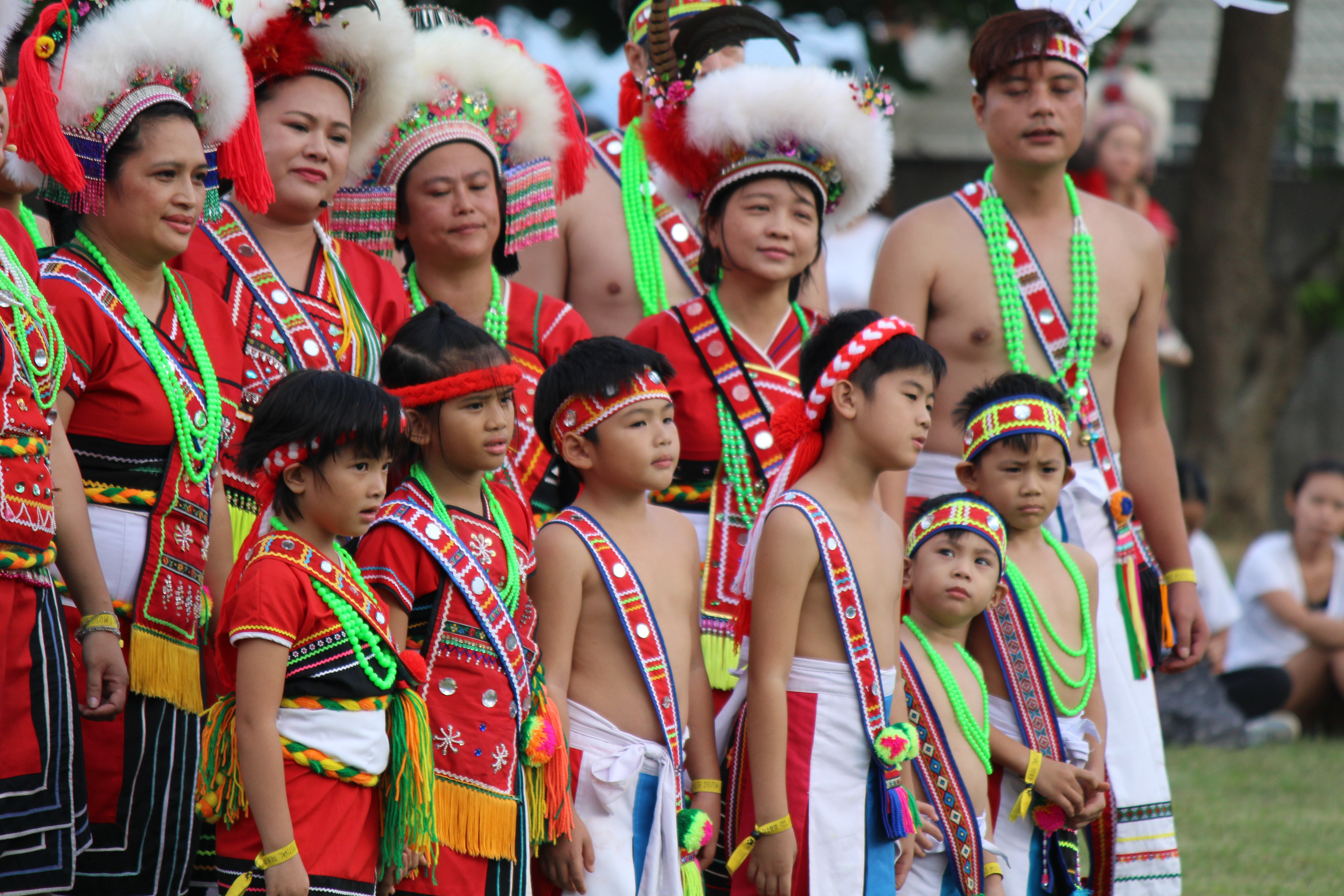
Amis/Pangcah dancers in Dulan, Taiwan

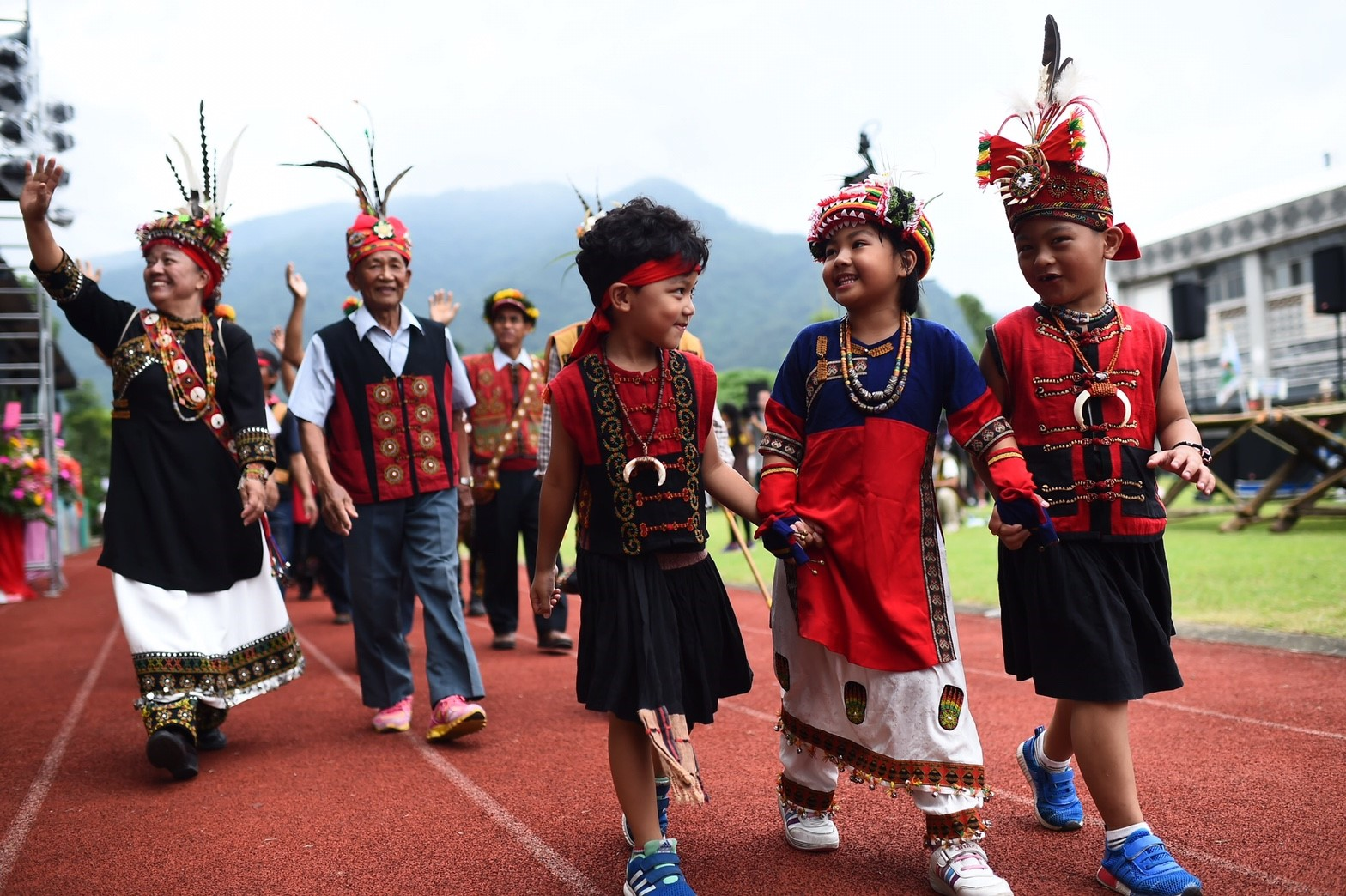
Paiwan and Rukai people celebrating a harvest festival in Sandimen, Taiwan

==== China ====
The ethnic clothings of the Chinese ethnic groups include mainly two forms as shanku and changshan, whereas modern Chinese gorvenmental representatives (both ROC and PRC) have been wearing Zhongshan suit for men and Qipao for women in international occasions as an ethnically non-specific option, dating back to the founding of Republican period.

Han Chinese, especially youths, has been raising the Hanfu Movement since the early 21st century by reviving the historical clothings of China before the Manchu Qing dynasty, termed hanfu, which encompasses styles like the shenyi or ruqun.

The Miao people, native to the sounthern hills of China, has their textile arts on their clothings.

==== Taiwan ====
Among Taiwanese indigenous peoples, traditional attire varies by group. The Rukai people wear garments like the ibibogo (a men's daily jacket) and the dalabu (a women's daily top). The Atayal people wear pearl-adorned shirts and skirts. The Bunun people use the design of the hundred-pace viper in their traditional dress.

==== Japan ====
In Japan, traditional attires are collectively referred to as Wafuku.

In Fukuoka Prefecture, traditional garments include the mizu happi and shime-komi. In Hokkaido, the Ainu people wear traditional clothing such as the tepa, a sacred belt called raun kut or upsoro kut, konci (hood), hos (leggings), and grass-skin jackets like tetarabe and utarbe. Ceremonial garments include the sapanpe and the matanpushi. Ryukyuans wear ryusou as traditional attire. In Okinawa Prefecture, the Kariyushi shirt is traditional clothing.

==== Korea ====
In South Korea, the traditional attire is the hanbok; it is known as the chosŏn-ot in North Korea. Modern hanbok are usually designed after the fashion established in the Joseon Dynasty, especially imitating the colorful styles of the nobility, though a pure white hanbok was a persistent national symbol for everyday wear. The hanbok consists of at least an overcoat po, jeogori, and a chima (skirt) for women and a vest and overcoat po, jeogori, and baji (trousers) for men. The upper garments are made to fit the torso closely, but not tightly, while the lower garments are much looser.

For babies and young children, Saekdongot is a style of hanbok worn for their first birthday and lunar new year from their first birthday until their seventh birthday.

Hanbok is worn for ceremonies and special occasions, such as weddings (with Hwarot) and festivals like Seollal.

==== Greater Siberia ====
Siberians nationalities have their traditional clothings.

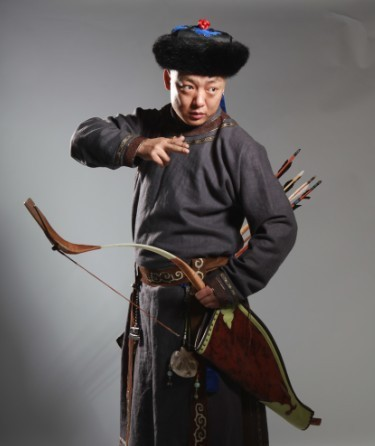
Akšan, Manchu singer and ulabun artist

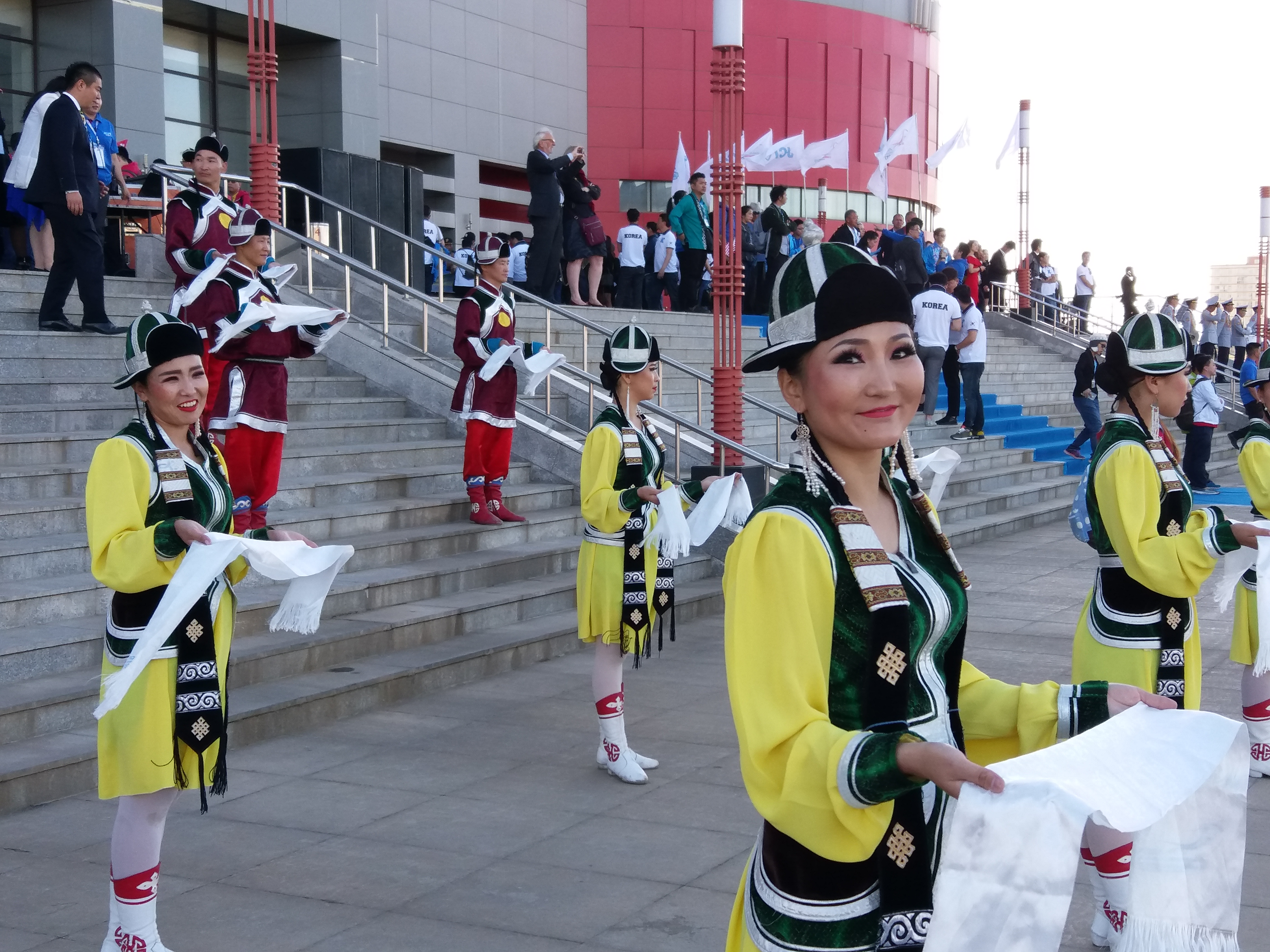
Mongolian deel

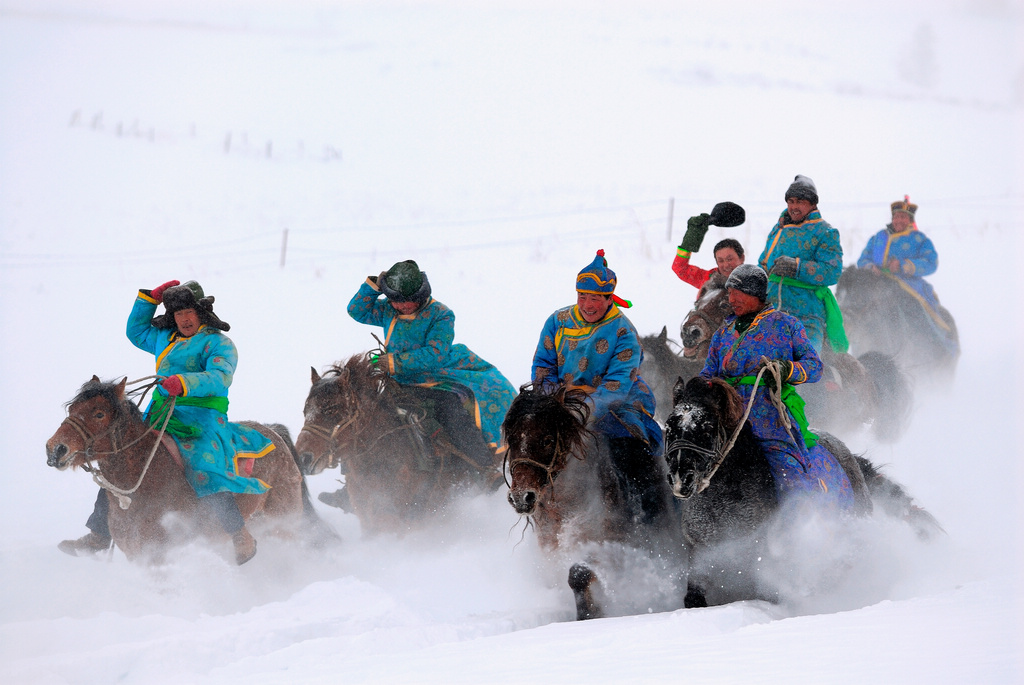
Tuvan horse-riders

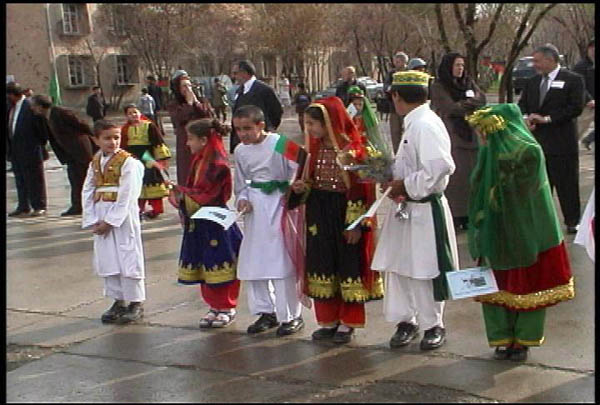
Afghan children wearing traditional clothes in Kabul

Mongolians wear the deel, which is featured in Buryatia, Tuva, Outer and Inner Mongolia.

In the Altai Republic, Southern Altaians wear items such as the ton (fur coat), sürü börük (cap), kaptal (overcoat). The chegedek (Altai-Kizhi) or chedek (Telengits) is a sleeveless cloak historically worn by married women; it is now used as bridal or festive attire.

In Manchuria, the Manchu people traditionally wore qizhuang, which includes the magua.

=== Central Asia ===
In the five states of Central Asia, as well as Afghanistan and Xinjiang, common are Chapan, khalat, tubeteika, turban, and paranja with women also wearing the saukele and kimeshek. Afghani Pashtun women may wear the firaq partug outside religious context.

=== Indian Subcontinent ===
A variety of cultural clothing common throughout the Indian subcontinent, including lehengas, cholis, salwar kameez, and dupatta

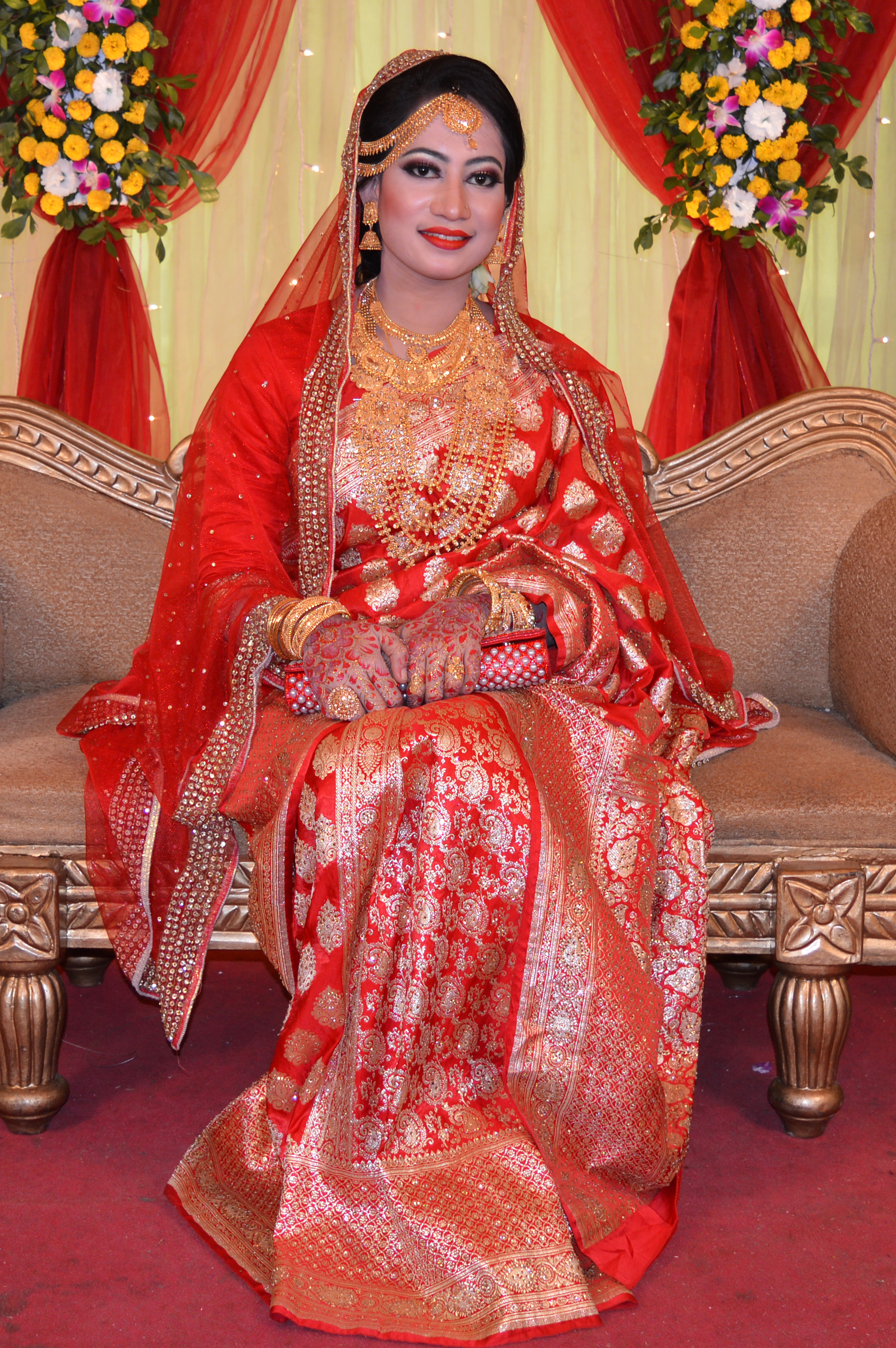
A Bangladeshi bridal handloom sari

In Indian subcontinent and Sri Lanka, men wear the achkan, dhoti, kurta, lungi, mundu, phiran, sherwani, and turban. Women's clothing includes the shalwar kameez, sari, patiala salwar, lehenga, choli, pathin, dupatta, and churidar. The mundum neriyatum is worn by the Malayali people of Kerala. The veshti is worn by Tamils. The Monpa people also have traditional clothing. selwar kamiz, orna, and kurtee.

==== Maldives ====
In the Maldives, men wear the Dhivehi mundu. Women's traditional clothing includes the dhivehi libaas, feyli, and buruga.

==== Tibetan Plateau ====
The Tibetan people, native to Tibet, traditionally wear the chuba.

Bhutan has sumptuary laws. The Driglam Namzha mandates what citizens should wear in public spaces. Bhutanese citizens must wear the traditional clothing of the Ngalop people, including a gho and kera for men and a kira and wonju for women, including for official business, schools and institutions, and official occasions and assemblies. The clothing of the Ngalop people also includes the toego and kabney for men, and rachus for women.

These restrictions apply when people are in or near "monastic fortresses (dzong), monasteries (gompa) and temples (lhakhang), and government buildings. Karin Altmann, a textile art scholar, describes the intent behind this law "to prevent specific features of Bhutanese culture from disappearing," and "to emphasize national identity", but it has contributed to conflict due to the ethnic and cultural diversity of Bhutan.

=== Southeast Asia ===
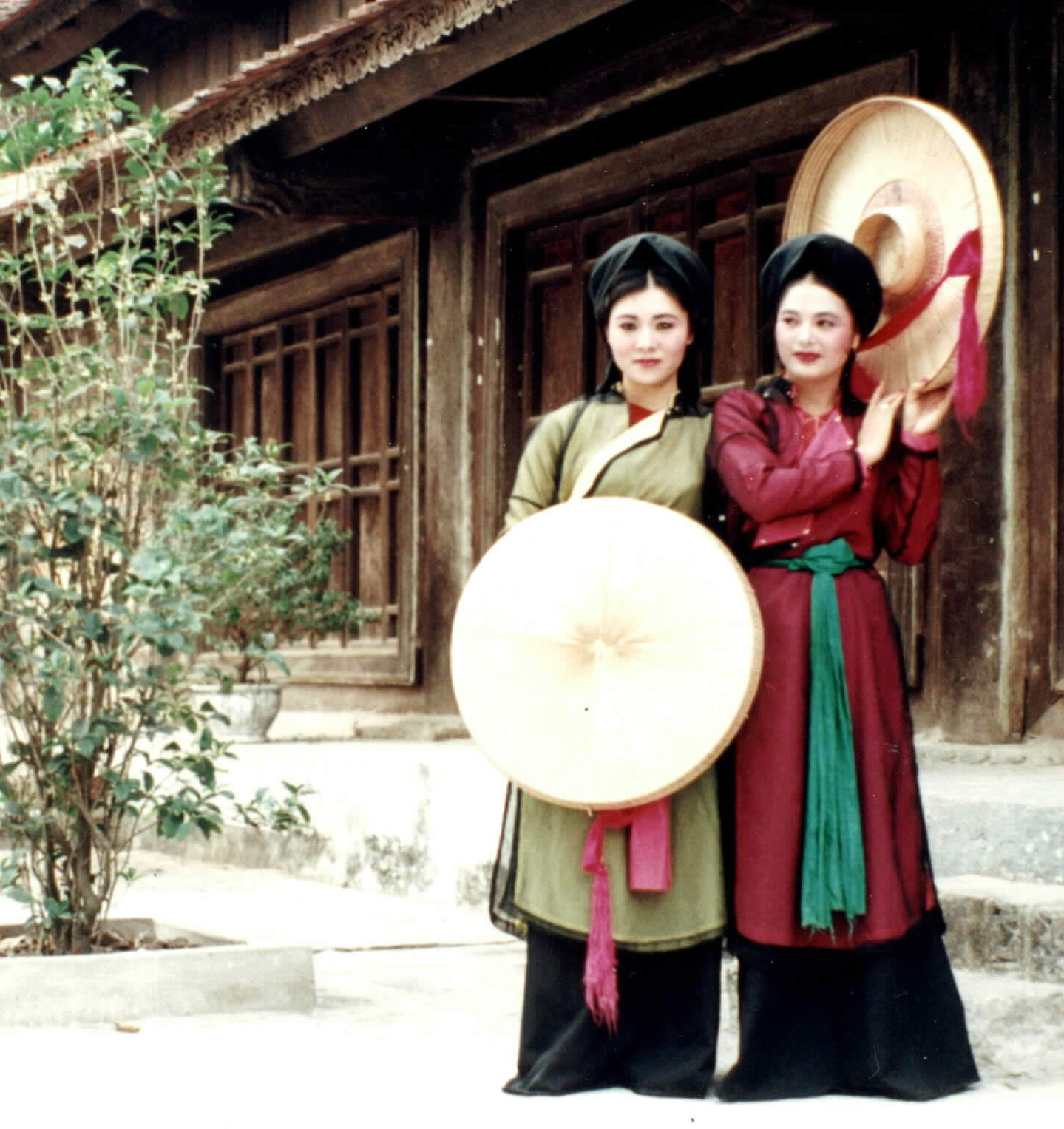
Áo tứ thân

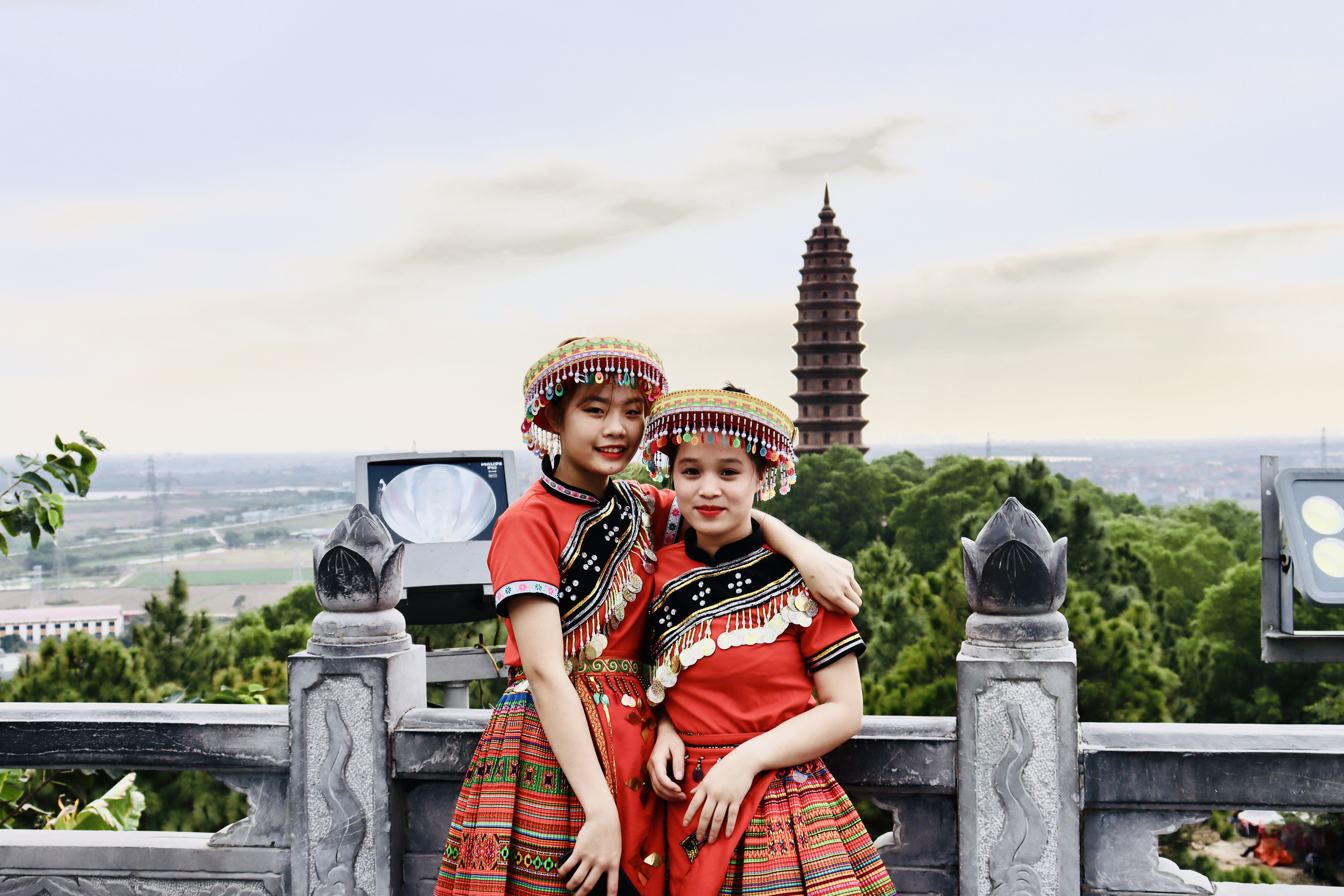
Hmong girls in Vietnam wearing traditional dress

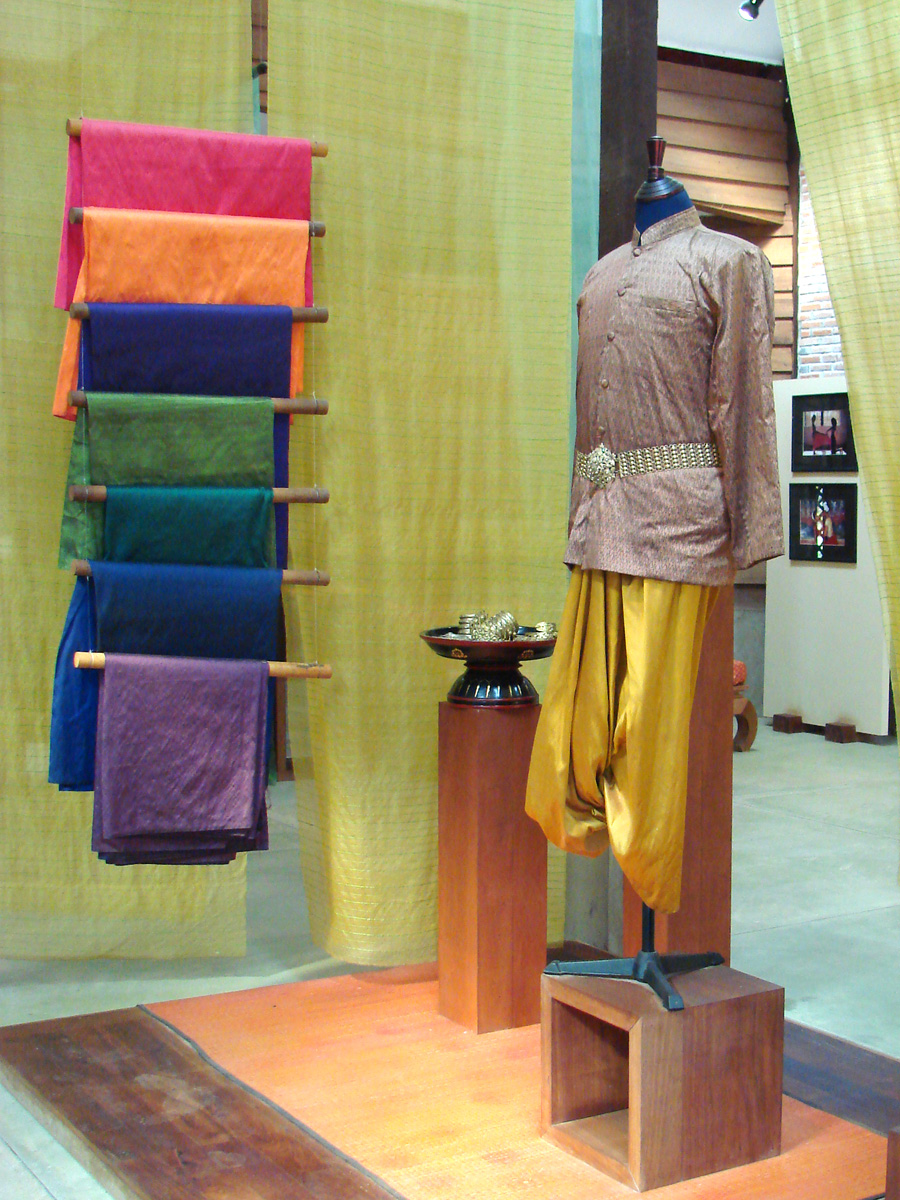
Cambodian Sompot Chong Kben

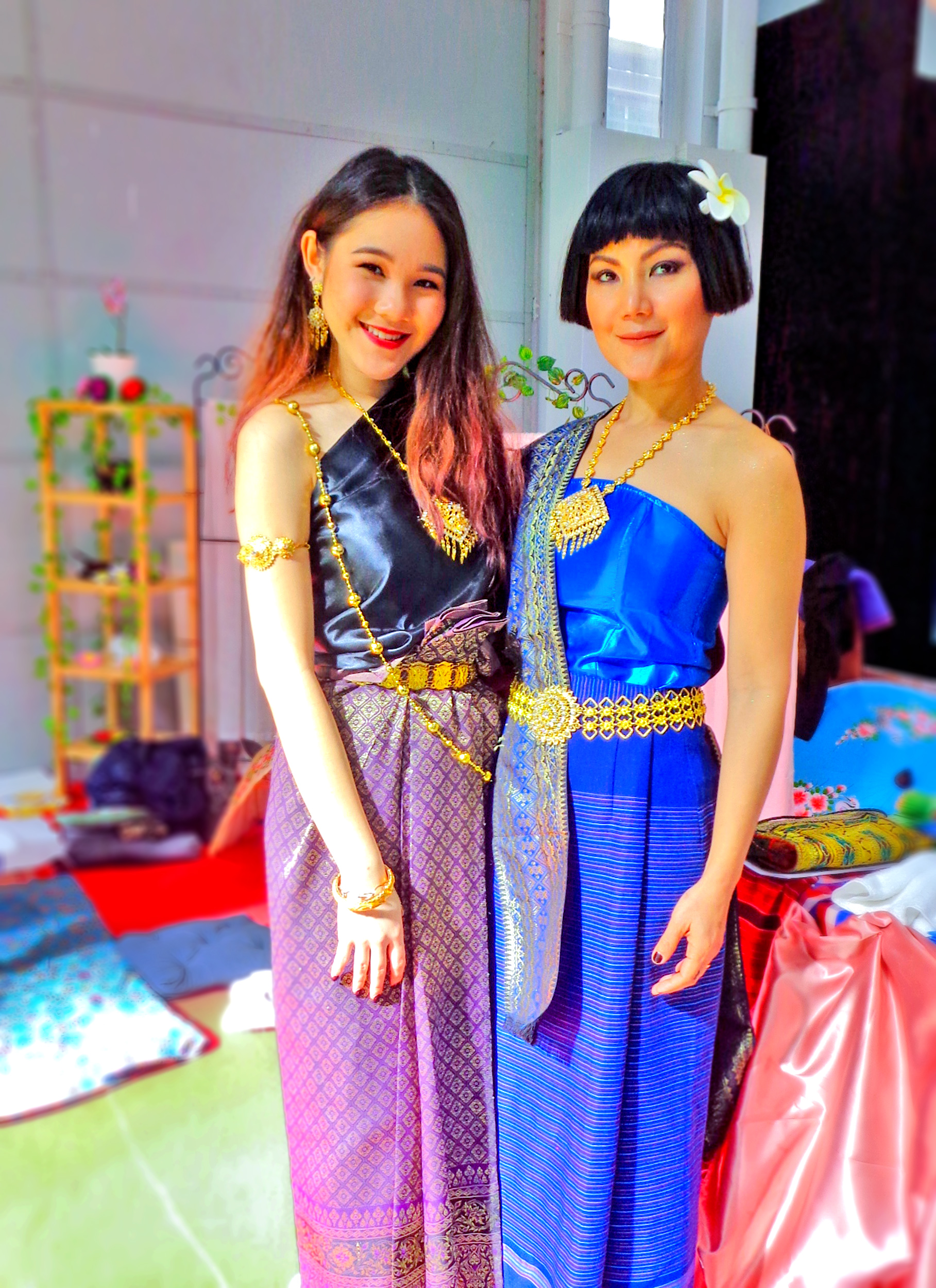
Thai traditional dress

==== Continental ====
In Cambodia, traditional attire includes the sampot, apsara, sabai, krama, and chang kben.

Traditional dress in Laos includes the xout lao, suea pat, pha hang, pha biang, and sinh.

Traditional male dress in Myanmar includes the longyi, gaung baung, and taipon. Female attire includes the thummy and eingyi.

In Thailand, chut thai (lit. 'Thai outfit') includes formal clothing such as the Thai Chakkri for women, and the suea phraratchathan for men. Both men and women may wear the Chong Kraben and sabai.

In Vietnam, traditional clothing includes the áo dài, áo tứ thân, áo bà ba, áo yếm, áo gấm, áo ngũ thân, as well as the obsolete áo giao lĩnh, áo trực lĩnh, áo viên lĩnh, áo đối khâm, and áo tấc.

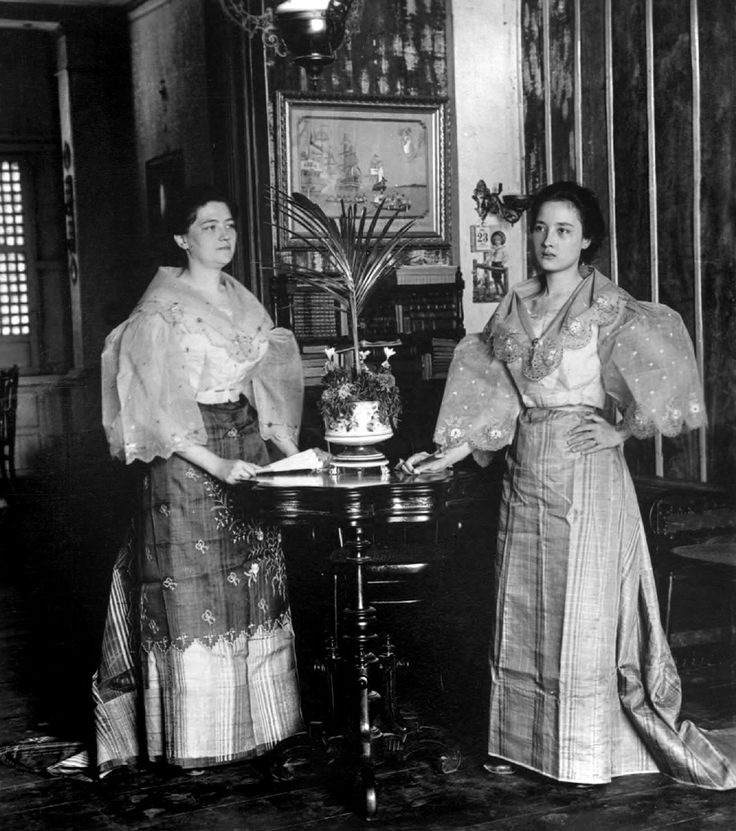
Filipina women wearing Maria Clara gowns (1899)

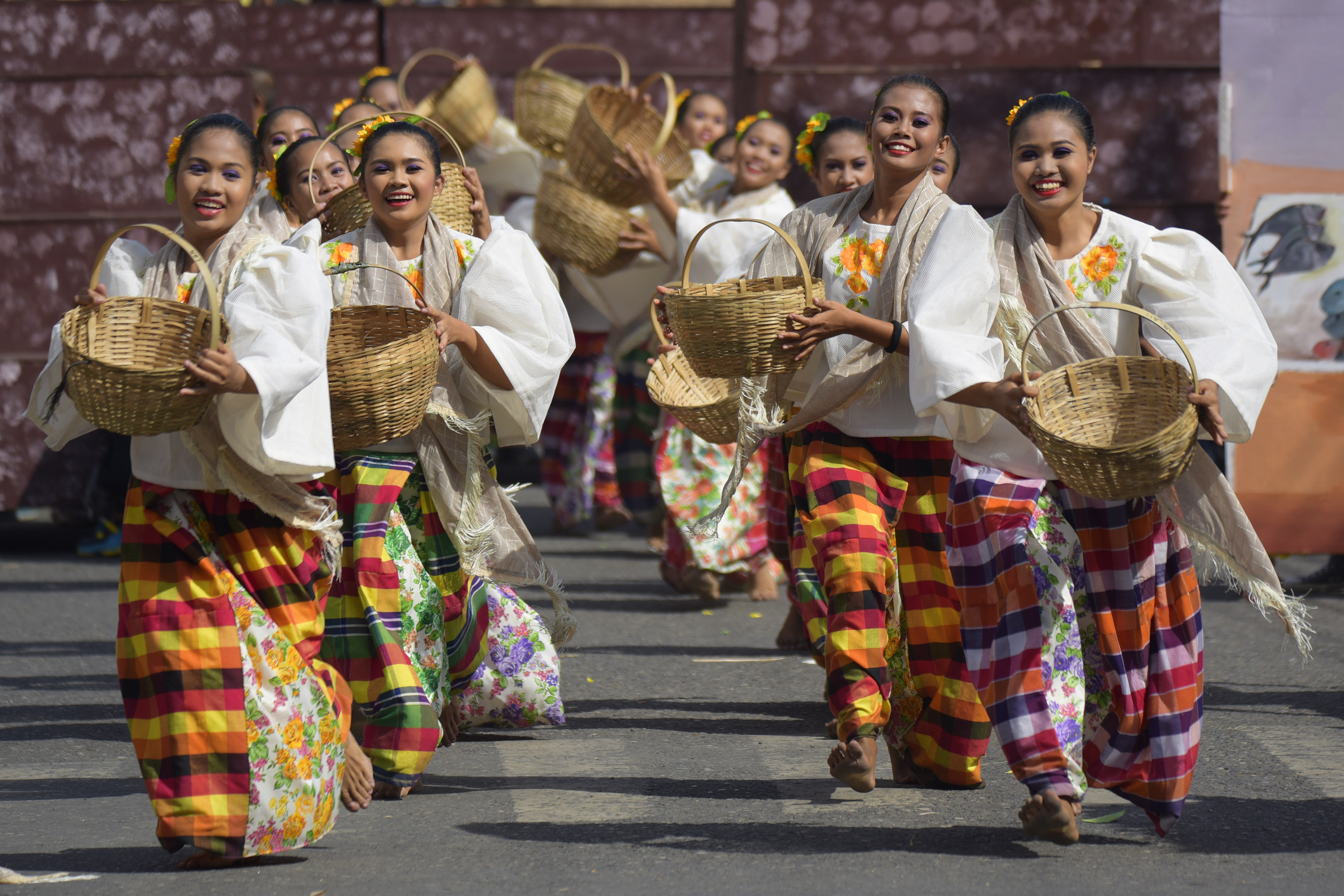
Visayan women wearing Baro't saya featuring their skirt patadyong while performing in festival dance

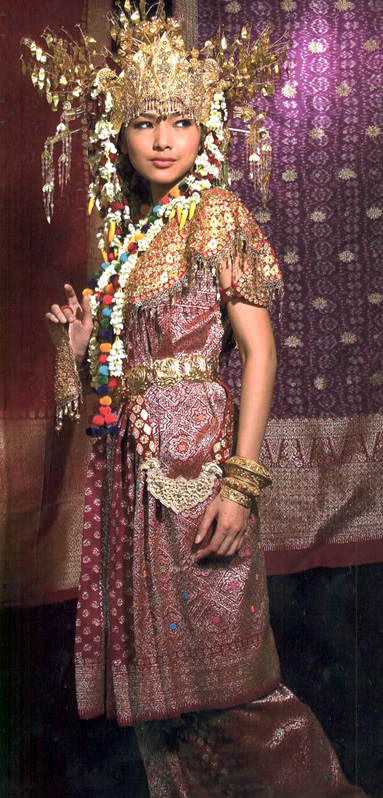
Indonesian girl wearing traditional Palembangese songket

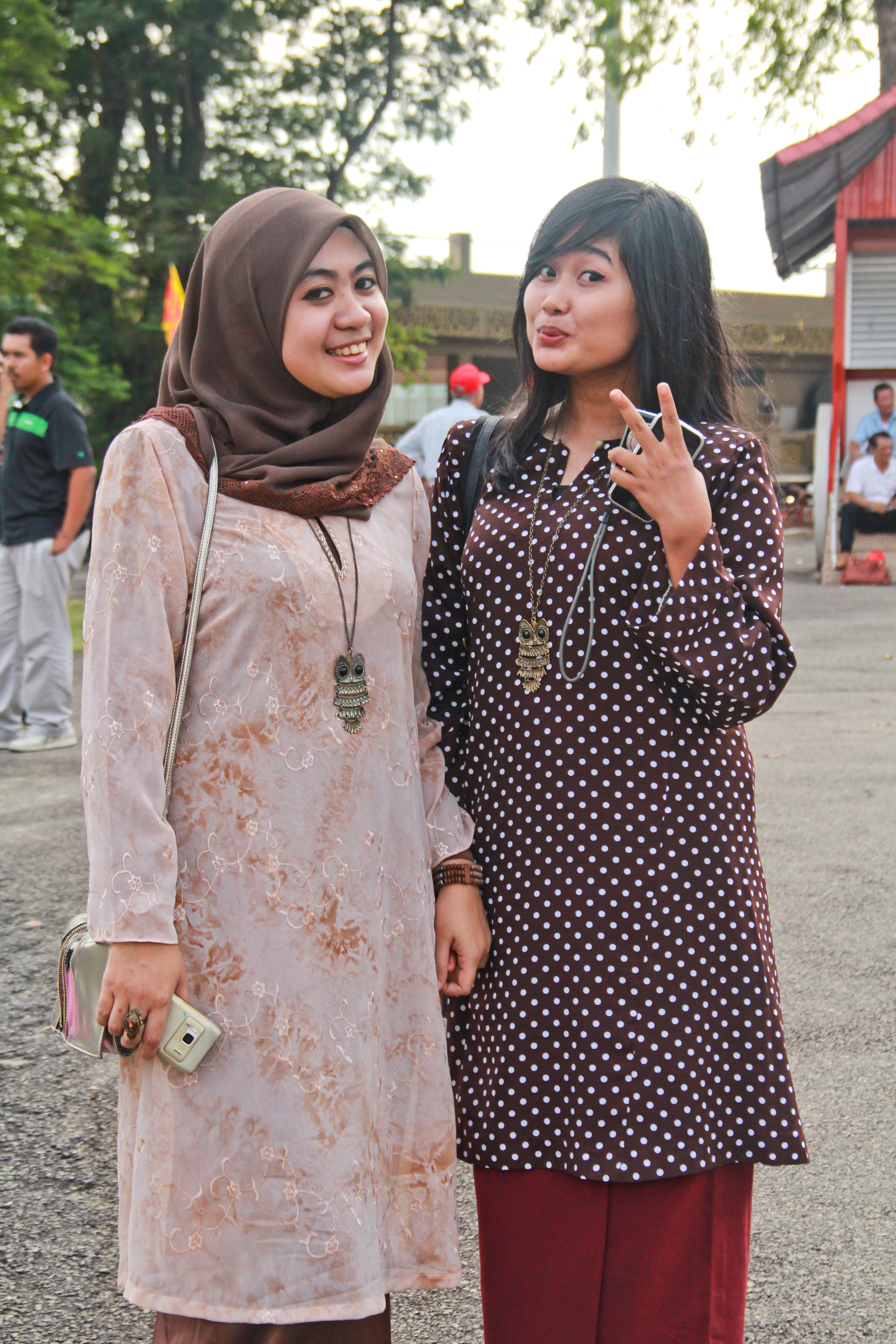
Malay women wearing Baju Kurung

==== Insular ====
Indonesia has many national and regional styles of clothing due to its cultural diversity. Among the Batak peoples, the ulos (tenun fabric) is traditionally worn. Javanese people wear garments such as the beskap, batik shirt, blangkon, songkok, and sarong for men; and the kebaya, tudung, and sarong for women. The Malay people traditionally wear the Baju Melayu, Baju Kurung, and songket. Among the Papua, the koteka is part of traditional dress.

Traditional clothing in East Timor includes the tais mane and tais feto.

In Malaysia, men traditionally wear the Baju Melayu and songkok, while women wear the Baju Kurung, baju kebarung (a kebaya/kurung hybrid), and tudung. Each state has its own baju style, including a distinct style for the Federal Territories.

In Brunei, traditional clothing includes the Baju Melayu and songkok for men, and the baju kurung and tudung for women.

In the Philippines, cultural attire for men includes the barong, while women wear the baro't saya, Maria Clara gown (or traje de mestiza), and terno. Other garments include the malong, patadyong, tapis, and salakot.

Cultural attire in Singapore varies. Among Chinese Singaporeans, traditional clothing includes the hanfu, cheongsam for women, and tangzhuang and changpao for men. Indian Singaporeans traditionally wear the sari for women, and the dhoti and kurta for men. Malay Singaporeans wear the Baju Melayu for men, and Baju Kurung and sarong for women. Peranakan women traditionally wear the kebaya; men traditionally wear the Baju Lokchuan.

=== Middle East ===
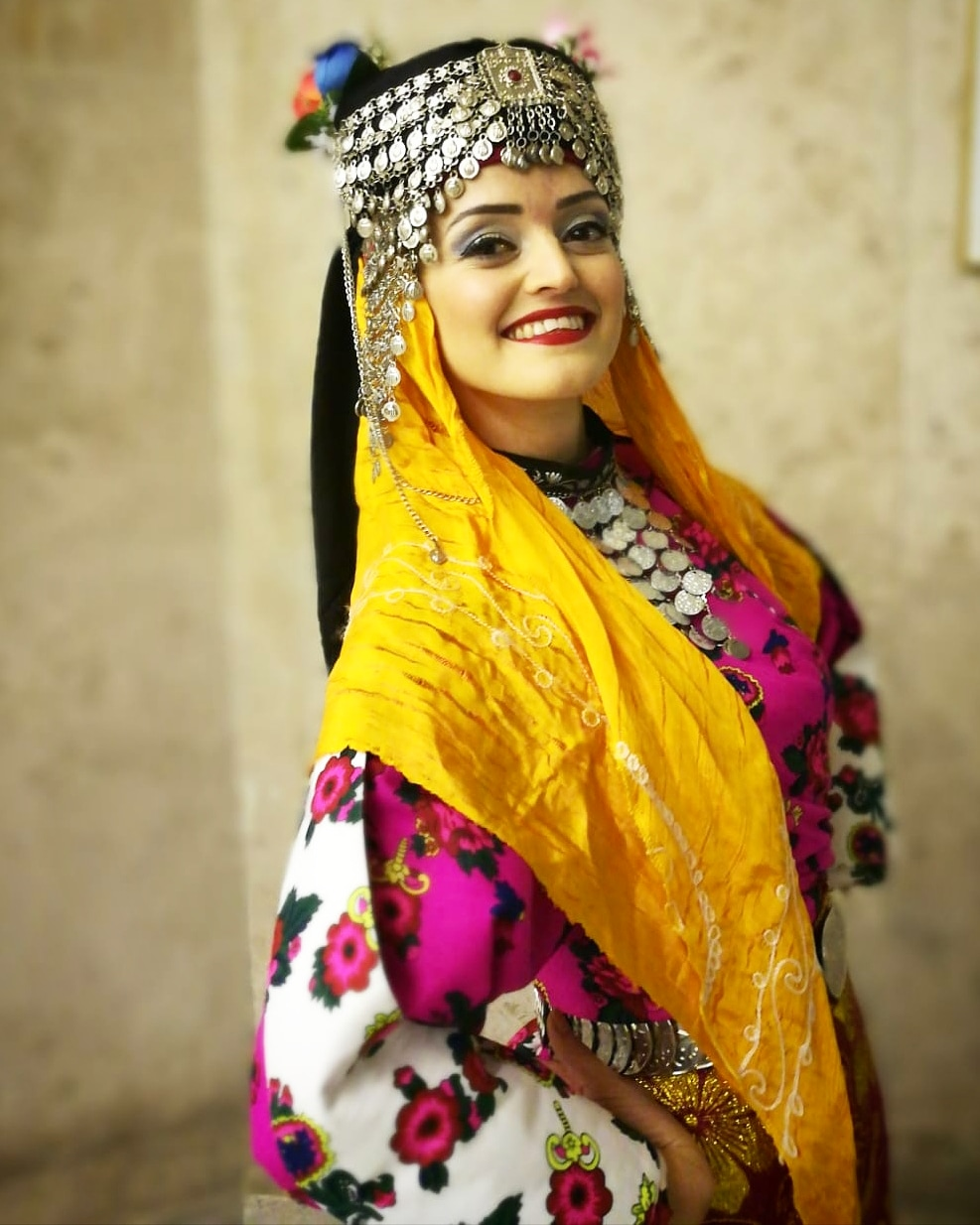
Turkish folk dancer

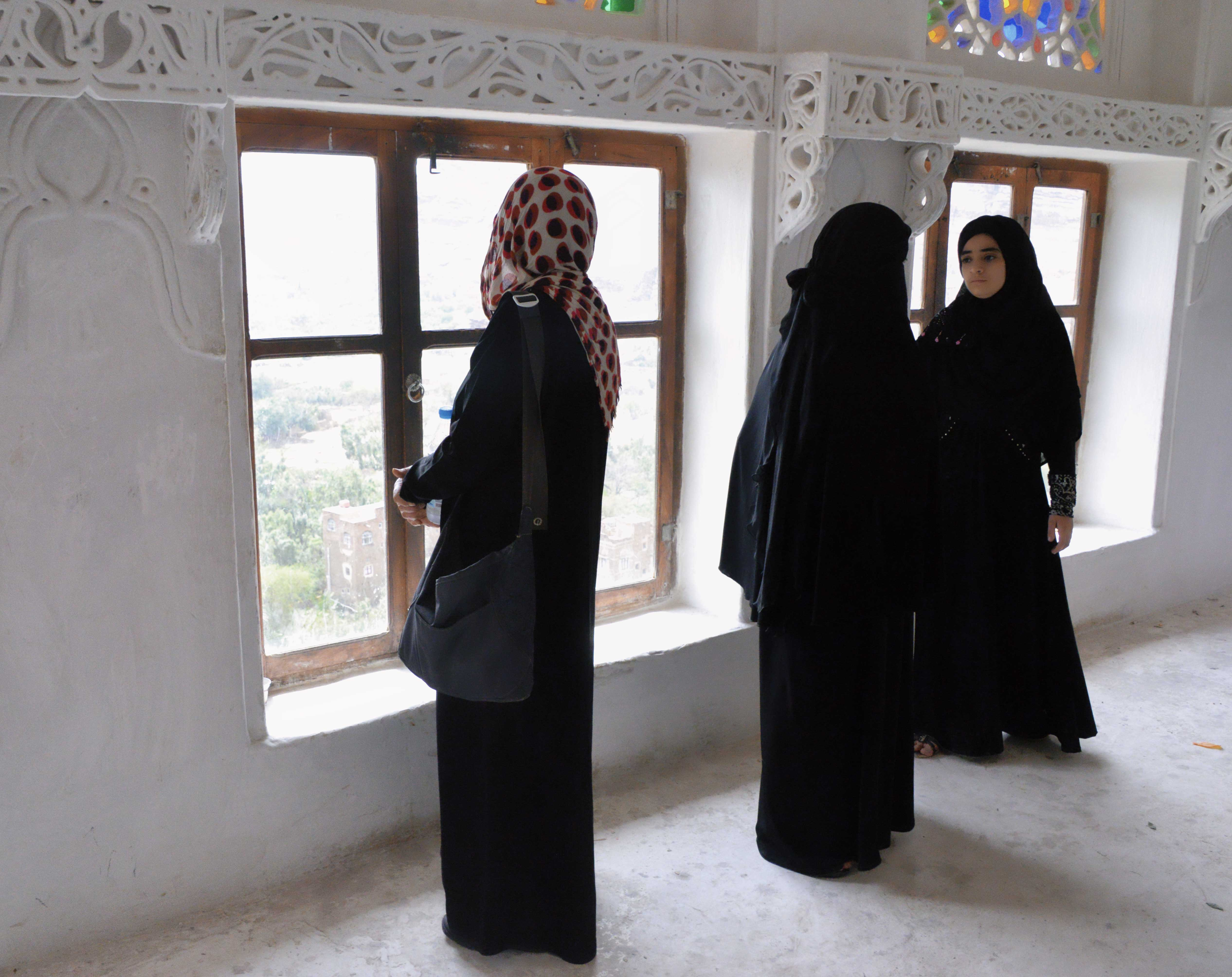
Yemeni women wearing abaya

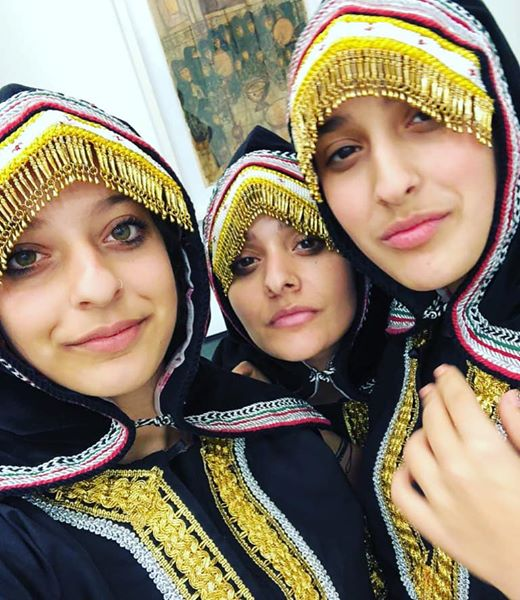
Traditional Yemenite Jewish gargush

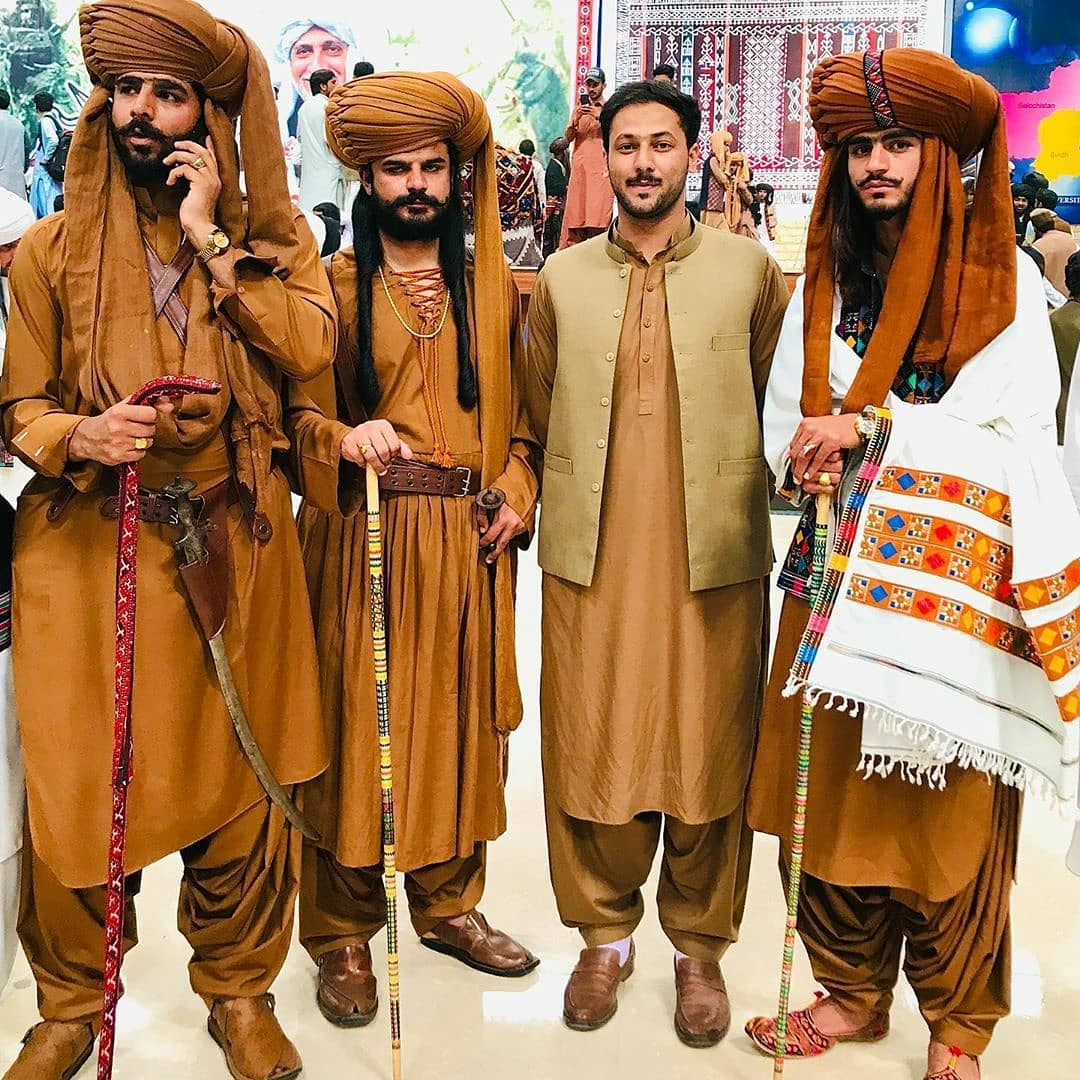
Baloch men wearing traditional dress, including shalwar kameez

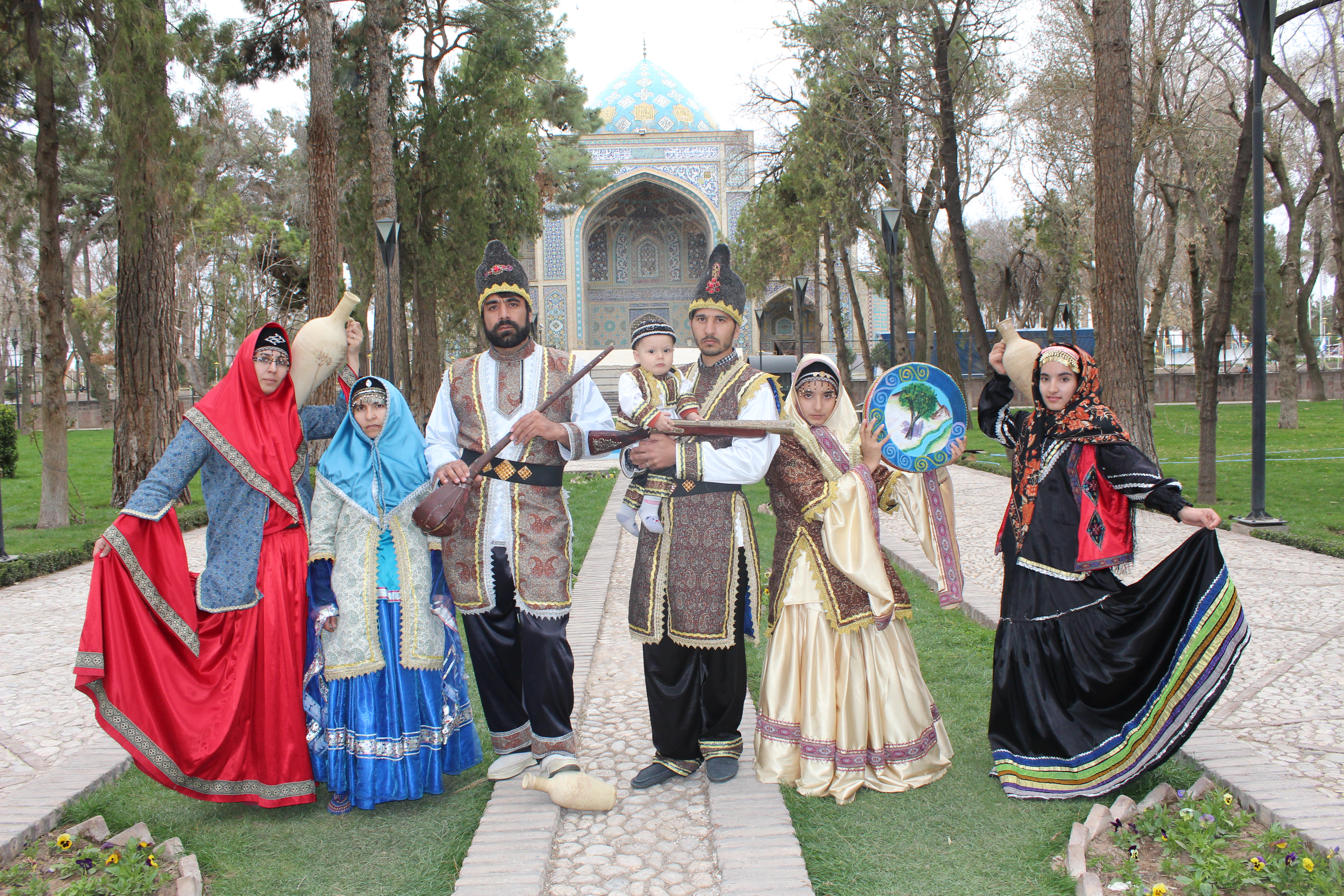
An Iranian family celebrating Nowruz in their traditional ethnic attire

==== Turkic ====
Traditional dress in Azerbaijan includes the arkhalig, chokha, kelaghayi, and kalpak.

In Turkey, traditional dress includes the kalpak, yazma, kaftan, turban, salvar, çarık, cepken-yelek, and boynuz kemer (horn belt).

==== Jewish ====
A national symbol of Israel is the tembel hat. Other traditional items include the sudra, gargush, the Hasidic rekel, the Sephardi kavese (hat), and biblical sandals.

Yemenite Jewish women also wear gargush.

==== Kurdish ====
Traditional Kurdish clothing or Cilûbergên Kurdî refers to the folk costumes of the Kurdish people. The traditions typically vary across different regions and tribes of Kurdistan, but it has some common elements. Historically, Kurdish clothing was more complex and varied, but it has evolved to a simpler form over time.

==== Arabic ====
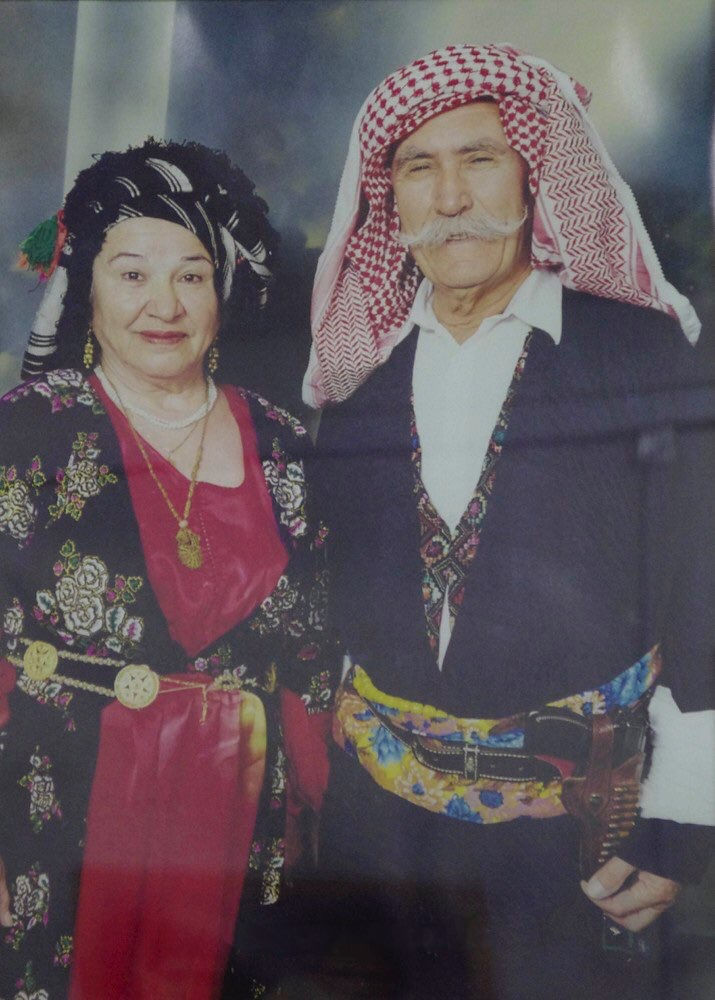
Kurdish couple in traditional dress

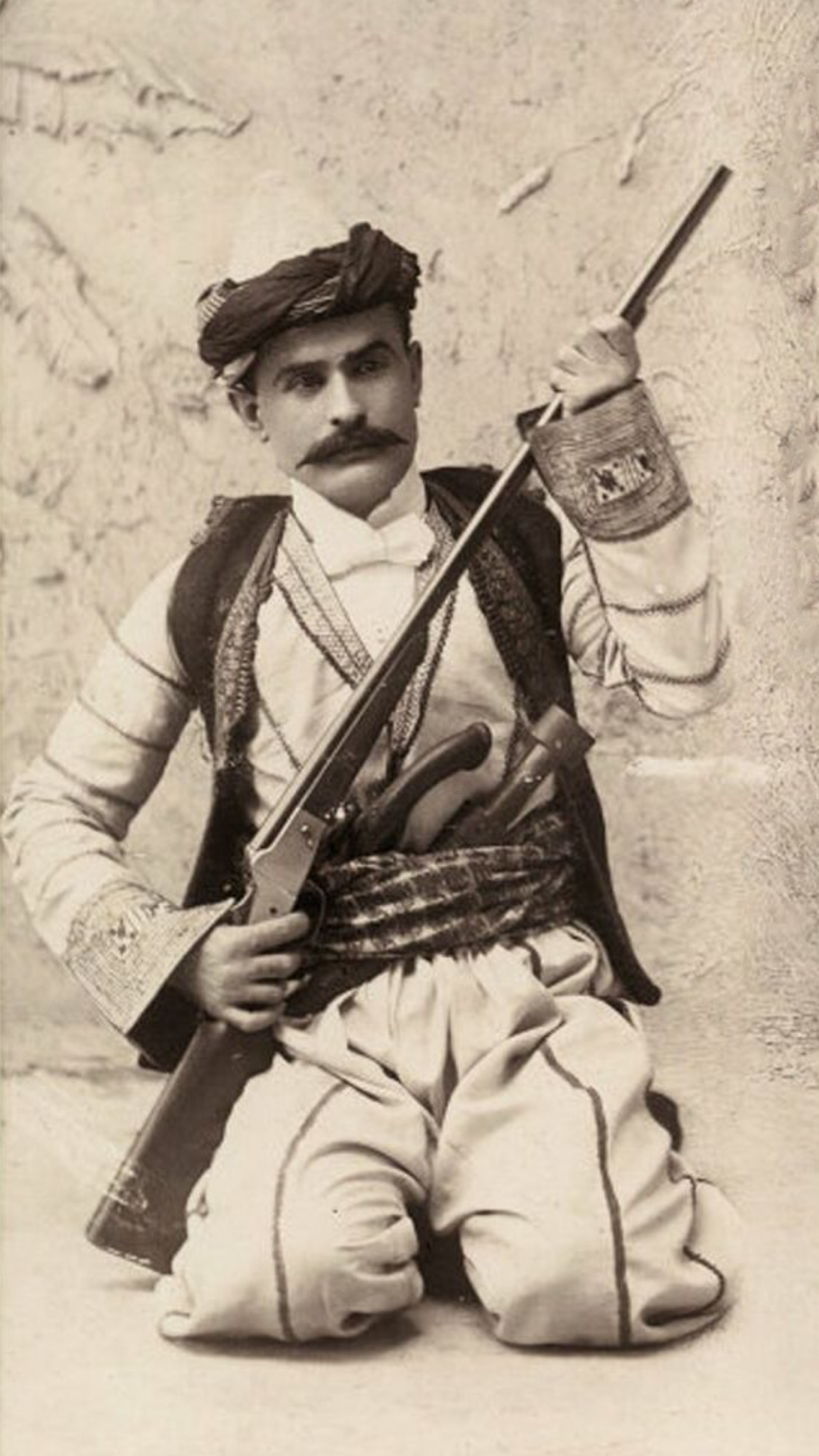
Kurdish man in traditional costume

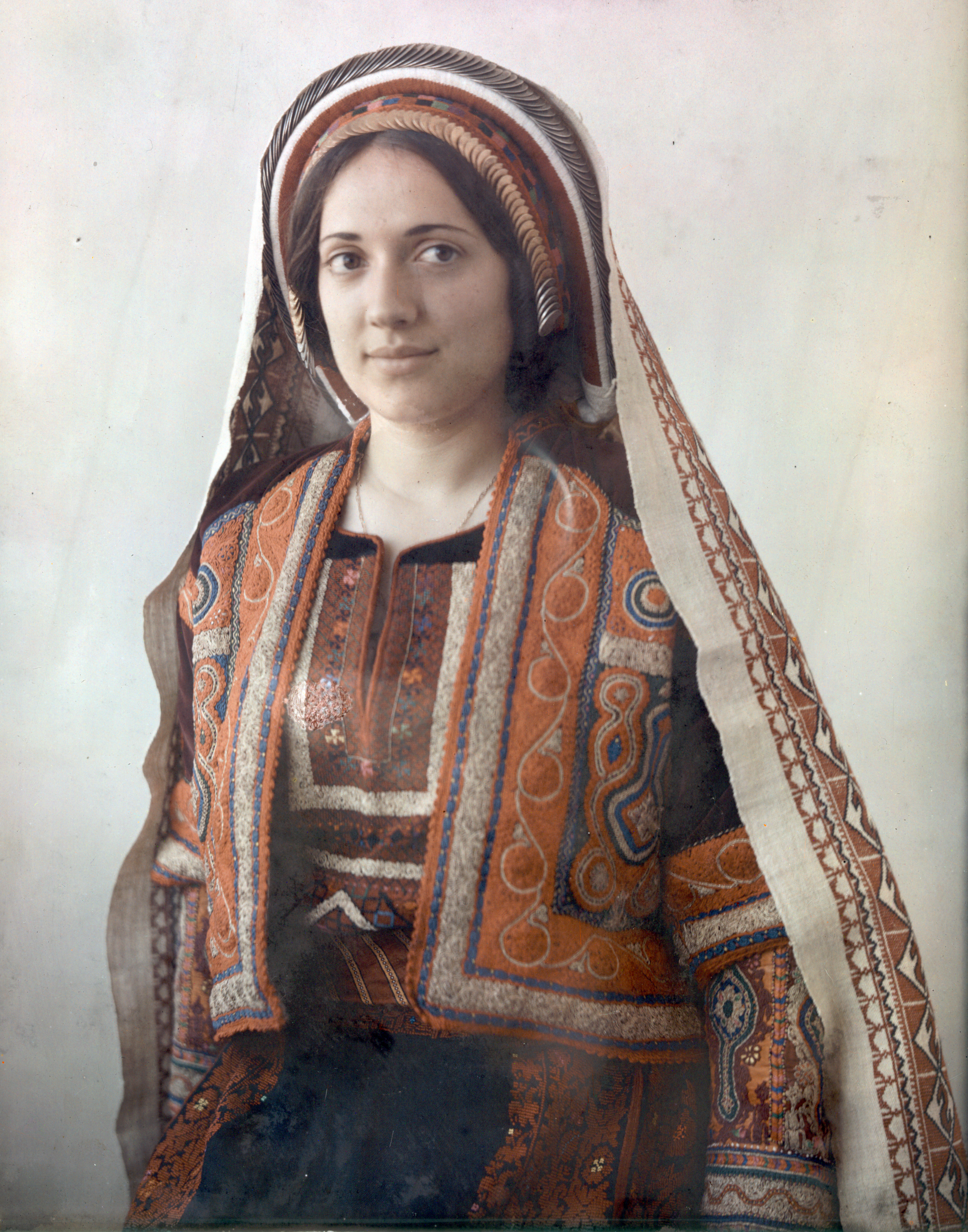
Ramallah woman wearing traditional Palestinian dress

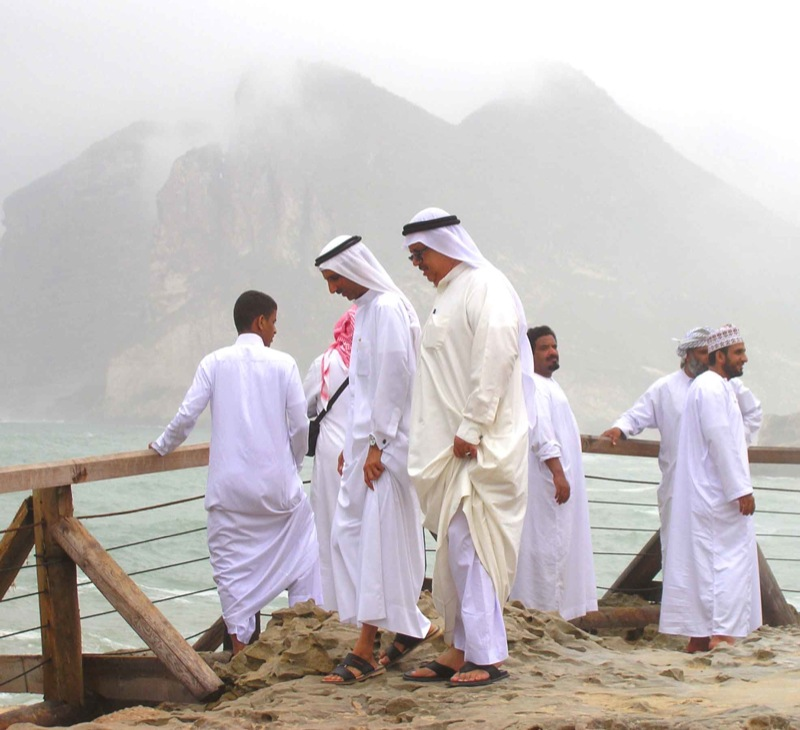
Gulf Arabs wearing traditional 'athwaab and headwear in Oman

Common Arabic clothing includes abaya, bisht, dishdasha, kandura, sirwal, thawb, with headwears like agal, keffiyeh, kufi, and turban.

In Iraq, traditional attire also includes the chador, Hashimi dress, and Kurdish clothing.

Traditional clothing in Jordan includes the keffiyeh, bisht, thawb, and Bedouin attire.

In Lebanon, men also wear taqiyah cap.

In Oman and Yemen, khanjar and izaar are also worn.

== Europe ==
=== Balkan nations ===
Greek folk dress

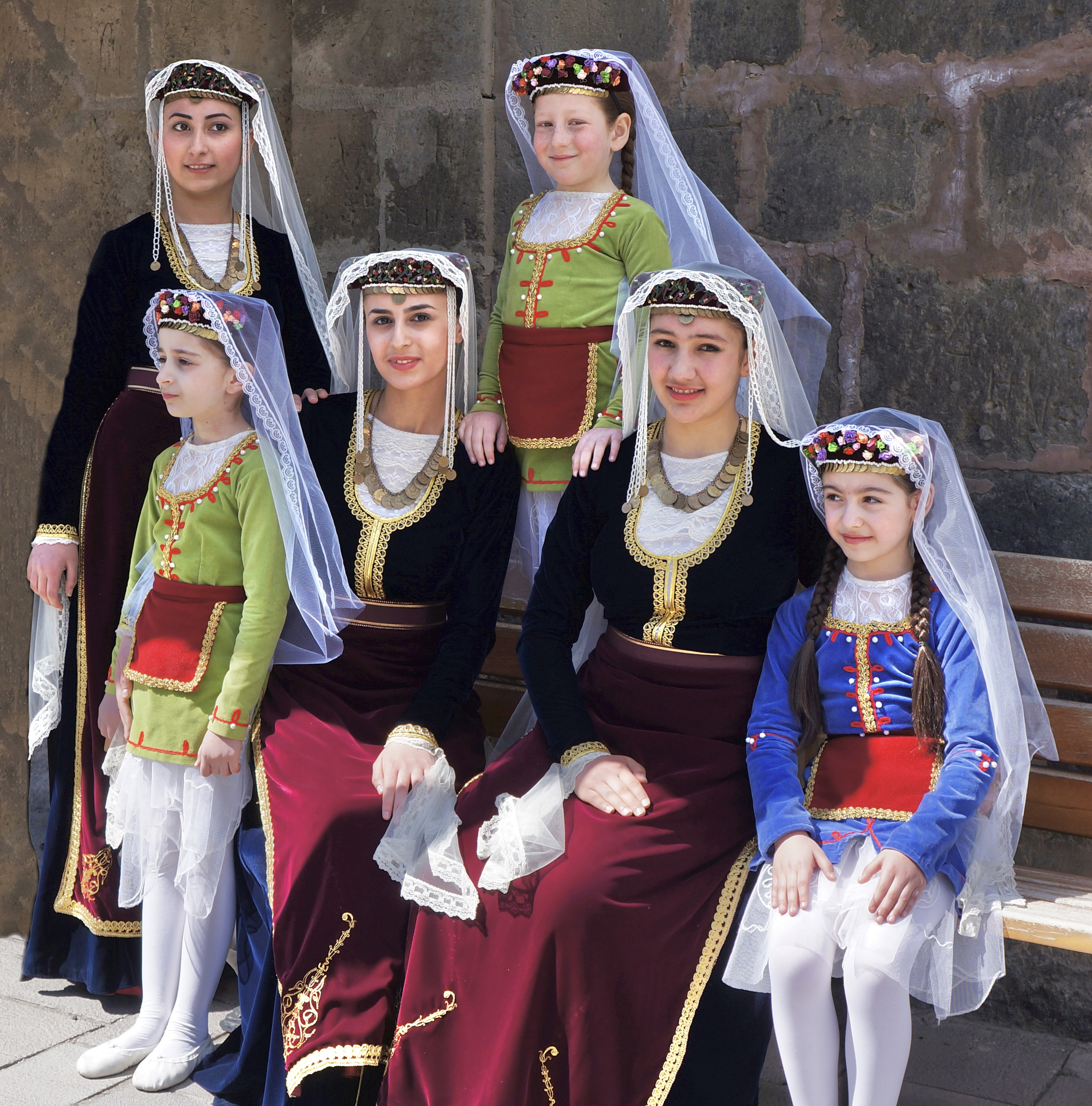
Armenian women wearing arkhaligs

Traditional clothing in Greece includes the fustanella, breeches (vraka), and the Amalia costume. The Greek fisherman's cap is commonly worn in coastal villages by the Aegean Sea.

In Cyprus, traditional clothing includes the zimbouni (waistcoat), vraka (men's breeches), and saiya (women's formal festival dress); but in Northern Cyprus, traditional garments include the cepken (yelek vest), salta, yazma, potur, and boynuz kemer.

Traditional clothing in Albania includes fustanella, tirq, xhamadan, and opinga.

In Malta, a traditional women's garment is the għonnella.

=== Caucasian nations ===
In Armenia, traditional attire (taraz) includes the arkhalig (long jacket), arakhchin, burka, chokha, kalpak, papakha, and shalvar.

In Georgia traditional dress includes the chokha, which has varying regional designs. The papakha is also a traditional garment.

In Ossetia, traditional dress includes the chokha.

In Russian Caucasus republics such as Chechnya, North Ossetia-Alania, and Adygea, the chokha, papakha, and ushanka are traditional.

=== Germanic nations ===
==== Germanosphere ====
Every state in Germany has its own version of regional costume (tracht). Bavaria's lederhosen and dirndl are widely recognized. So has Austria, Liechtenstein and German-speaking Switzerland, with the best-known from Tyrol, Austria. The best-known Swiss folk dress comes from the German-speaking cantons of Appenzell, Bern, and Zug.

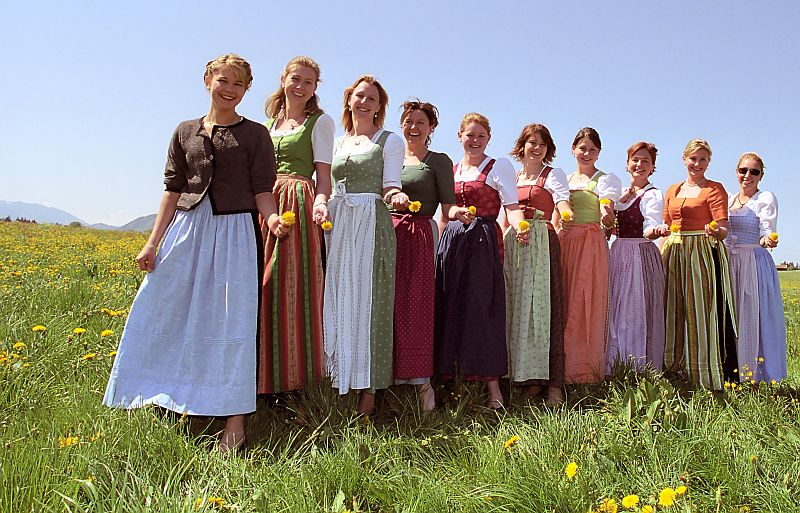
Young women in German dirndls

==== Low Countries ====
In Belgium, the bleu sårot is a traditional garment in Wallonia.

In the Netherlands, many areas, villages, and towns used to have their own traditional clothing. In the 21st century, only a few hundred people still wear traditional dress daily, mainly in Staphorst, Volendam, and Marken. Outside of the Netherlands, the most well-known parts of Dutch folk costumes are the Dutch woman’s bonnet and klompen. In North Brabant, the poffer is a traditional garment.

==== British Isles ====
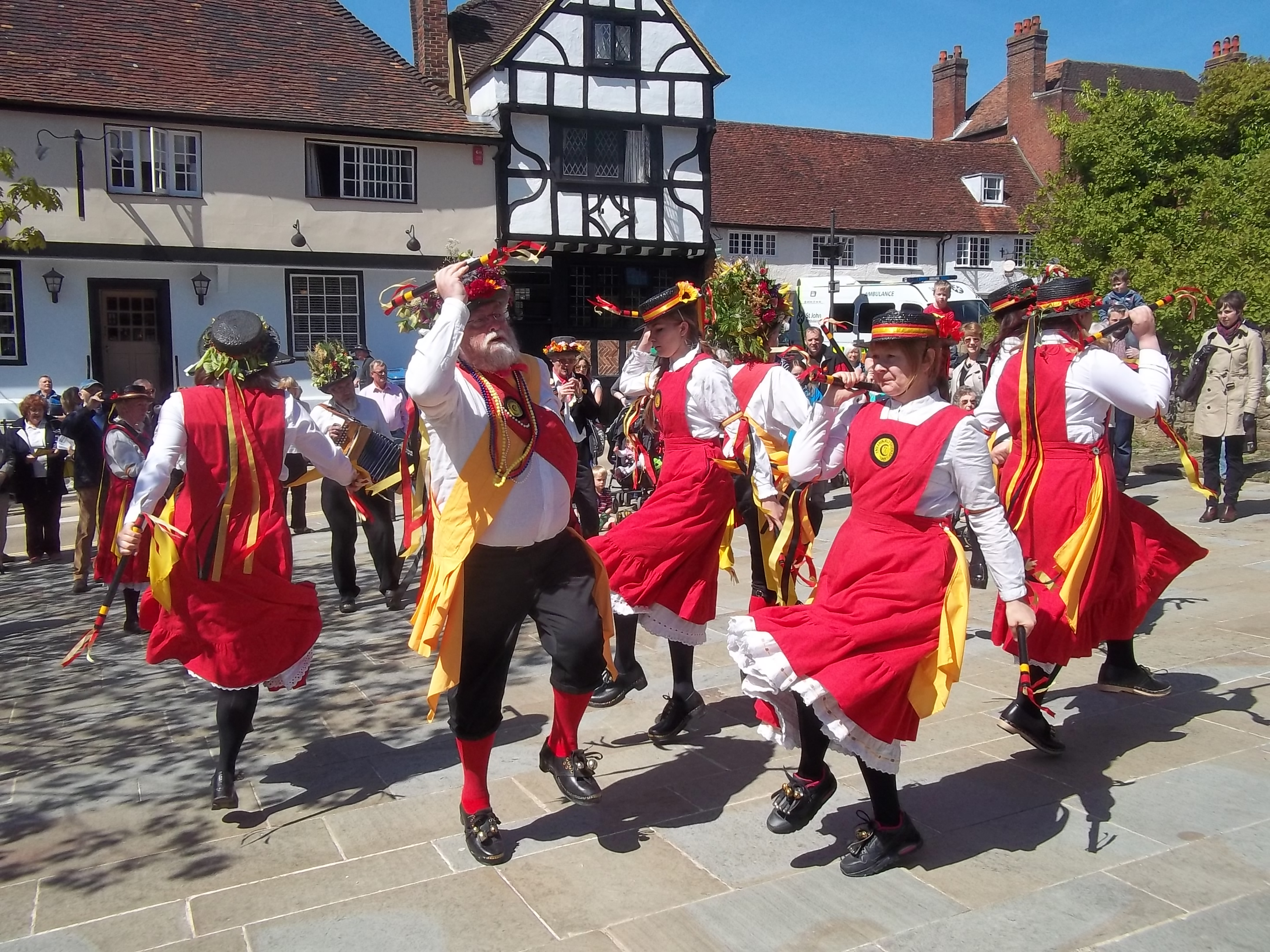
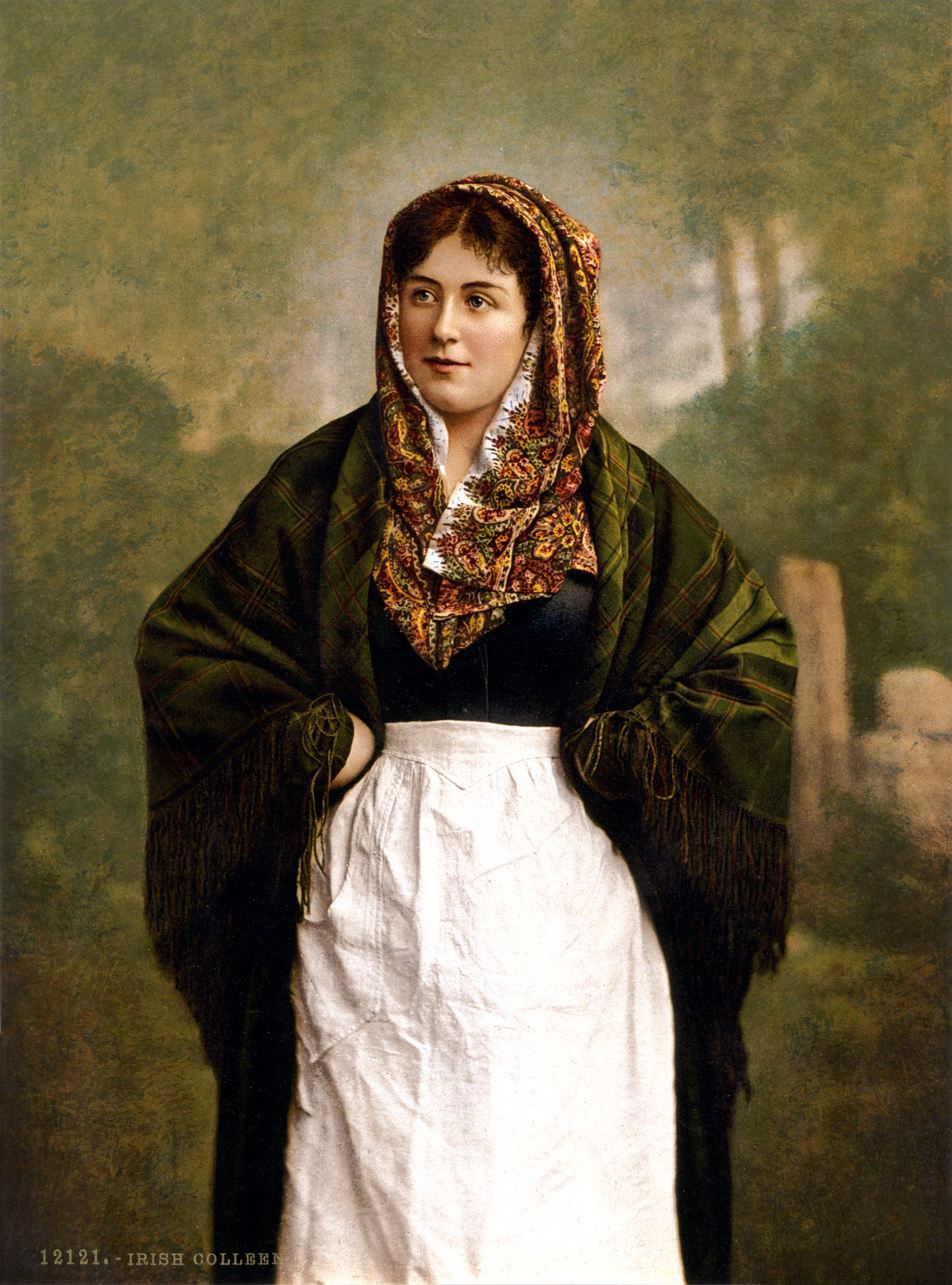
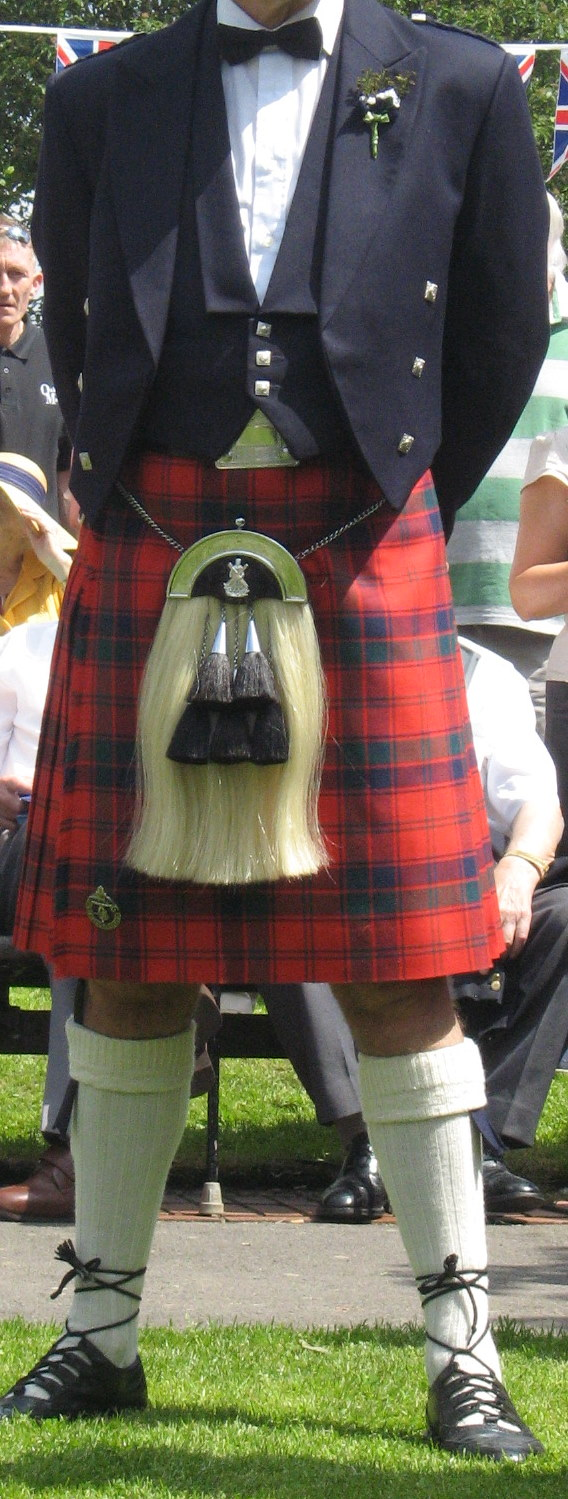
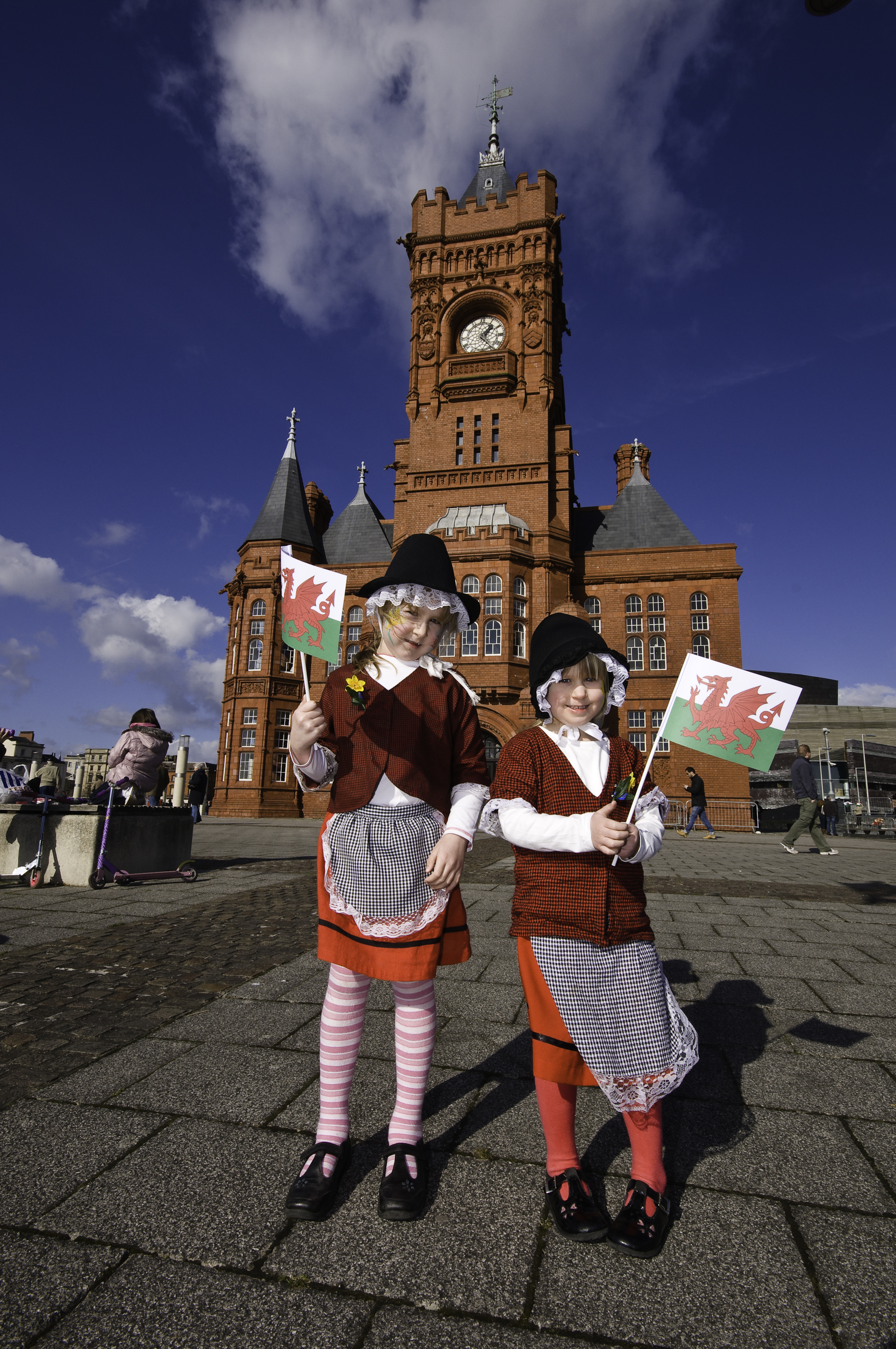
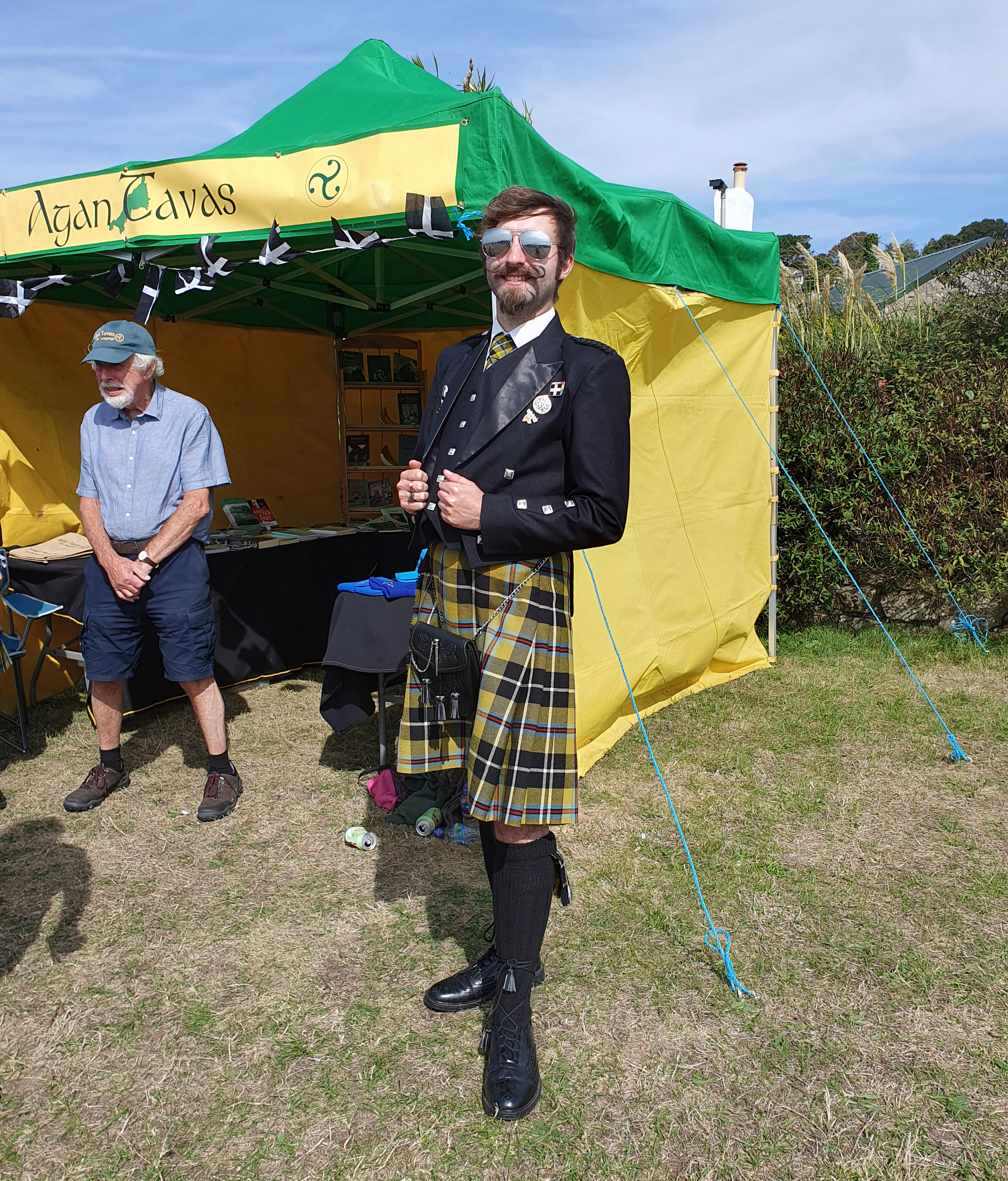
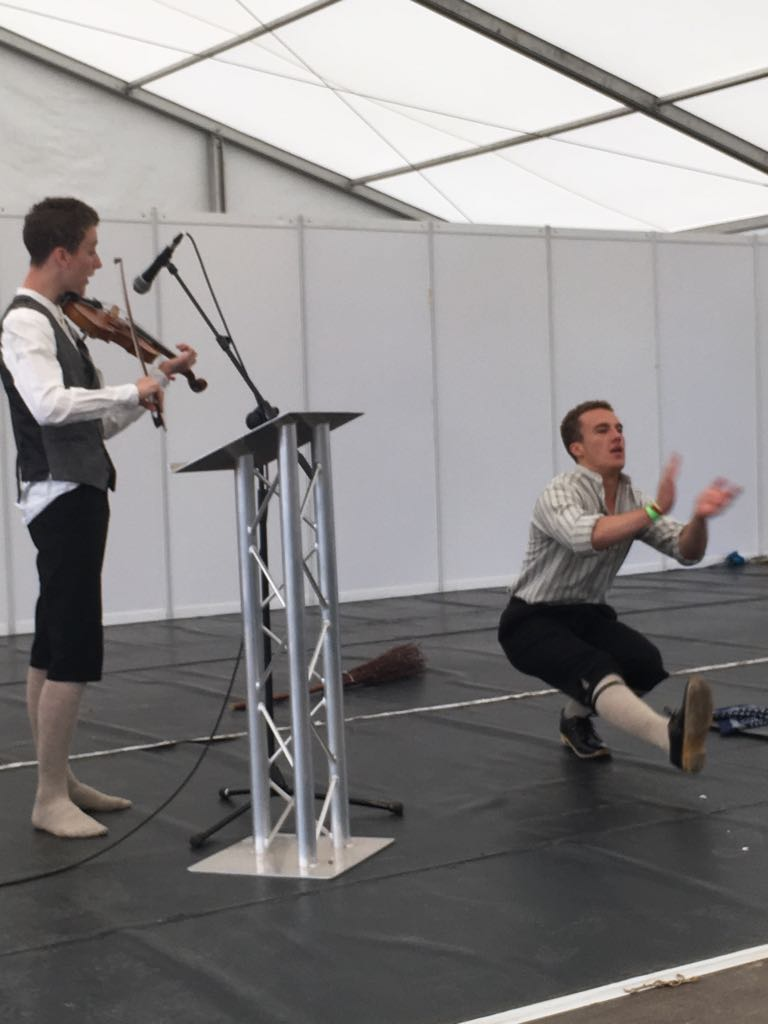
Top row: English Morris dancers wearing traditional dress and an Irish woman wearing a traditional green plaid shawl.
Middle row: A modern Scottish kilt and sporran and children wearing Welsh costume on St David's Day celebrations.
Bottom row: A man wearing Cornish tartan on Gorsedh Day 2025 at Marazion, Cornwall and a traditional Welsh stepdance at the 2017 National Eisteddfod in Bodedern.

In England, the lack of a singular representative folk costume has been attributed to historical factors which negated the need to assert national identity, as well as cultural imperialism which saw English fashions, such as the Savile Row tailoring of modern business suits, influence the global standards for business attire around the world. The English historian David Starkey quoted H.G. Wells in stating "the English are the only nation without national dress". Starkey argued that "It is a glory that we don’t have such a thing".

Despite the lack of a unifying official national dress, the English smock survived as a folk garment once worn everyday by the English peasant, with embroidery and colour depending on region, predominantly worn in Southern England and the Midlands. In Northern England, the flat cap evolved and became traditional, along with the maud or shepherd's plaid, which is often worn today in a smaller form by Northumbrian pipers. In coastal towns, the fisherman's gansey is also worn. There are also surviving regional traditions of English folk costume found, chiefly in the form of folk dance costumes. Cotswold Morris costumes typically consist of white shirts with trousers or breeches, decorated with colourful belts, braces, rosettes, armbands, and sashes or baldrics. Dancers often wear hats, carry handkerchiefs, and wear bell-pads around the shins as part of the performance. North West morris teams in Lancashire and Cheshire wear colourful clothing, inspired by the festival atmosphere of the old rushcart processions costumes. Male costumes commonly include decorated velvet waistcoats, breeches, sashes, and elaborate hats adorned with flowers and feathers. In the 1970s it was common for women’s teams to wear clothing inspired by 19th century fashions. These are often paired in modern revivals with iron- or rubber-rimmed wooden clogs. In the North East, the traditional rapper dance costume is derived from a stylised version of 19th century workwear worn on the Northumberland and Durham Coalfield, featuring shirts, waistcoats, sashes, black shoes, and hoggers—a form of short, loose trousers traditionally worn by the miners.

In Cornwall, traditional items include the sou'wester hat, fisherman's smock, gansey, bal-maiden clothing, and Cornish kilts and tartans.

In Ireland, traditional attire includes the aran sweater, Irish walking hat, flat cap, grandfather shirt, Galway shawl, brogue, and costumes used in Irish stepdance. In Northern Ireland, traditional dress is similar to the rest of Ireland.

In Scotland, Highland dress includes the kilt or trews, tam o'shanter or Balmoral bonnet, doublet, Aboyne dress, and brogues or ghillies. In the Scottish Lowlands, dress includes the maud and blue bonnet. In Wales, folk costumes are dominated by the Traditional Welsh costume, which features in many aspects of Welsh cultural life such as Saint David's Day celebrations, Eisteddfodau or in Welsh dance. The costume includes versions of the garments worn by working women across Europe in the 17th and 18th centuries (such as the shawl), as well as uniquely Welsh features like the prominent Welsh hat. The costume became a cultural icon of Wales in the 1840s, but even after the costume had ceased to be seen as fashionable, it continued to be worn by women for events such as royal visits, at church or chapel, and for photographs and artwork such as the 1908 painting Salem. The male folk costume is less well known outside of Wales, but also derives from the clothes of working people in the 18th century. Consisting of a red flannel shirts, waistcoat, jacket, clogs and breeches with stockings. Welsh folk-clothing was primarily made up of locally manufactured woollen garments, such as the Welsh Wig and Monmouth cap.

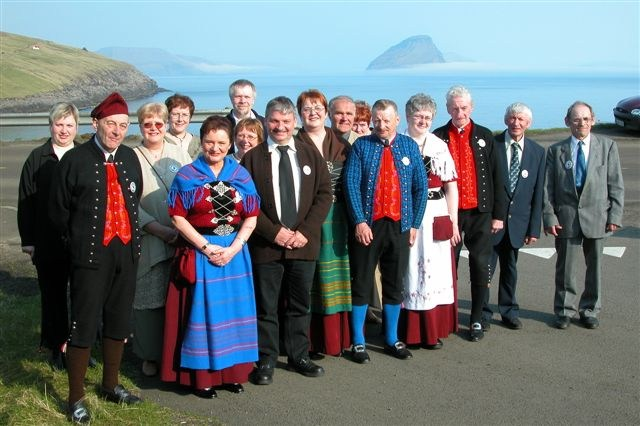
Faroese folk dance club with some members in national costumes

==== Nordic nations ====
In Denmark, traditional clothing includes folkedragt.

On the Faroe Islands, traditional dress is known as the føroysk klæði.

In Iceland, traditional clothing is known as the þjóðbúningurinn.

In Norway, each county and Svalbard has a designated folk costume, or bunad. The most famous bunader are from Hardanger and Setesdal. Sámi people wear gákti and, for colder weather, luhkka.

In Sweden, the traditional folkdräkt varies by province. Since 1983, an official national costume, Sverigedräkten, has also been used. The nationella dräkten was worn in the 18th century.

=== Latin nations ===
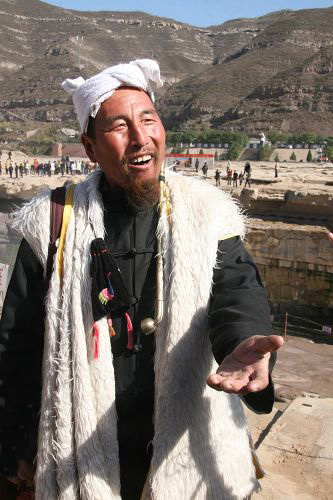
Man wearing a zamarra, a sheepskin coat traditionally worn by Basque shepherds

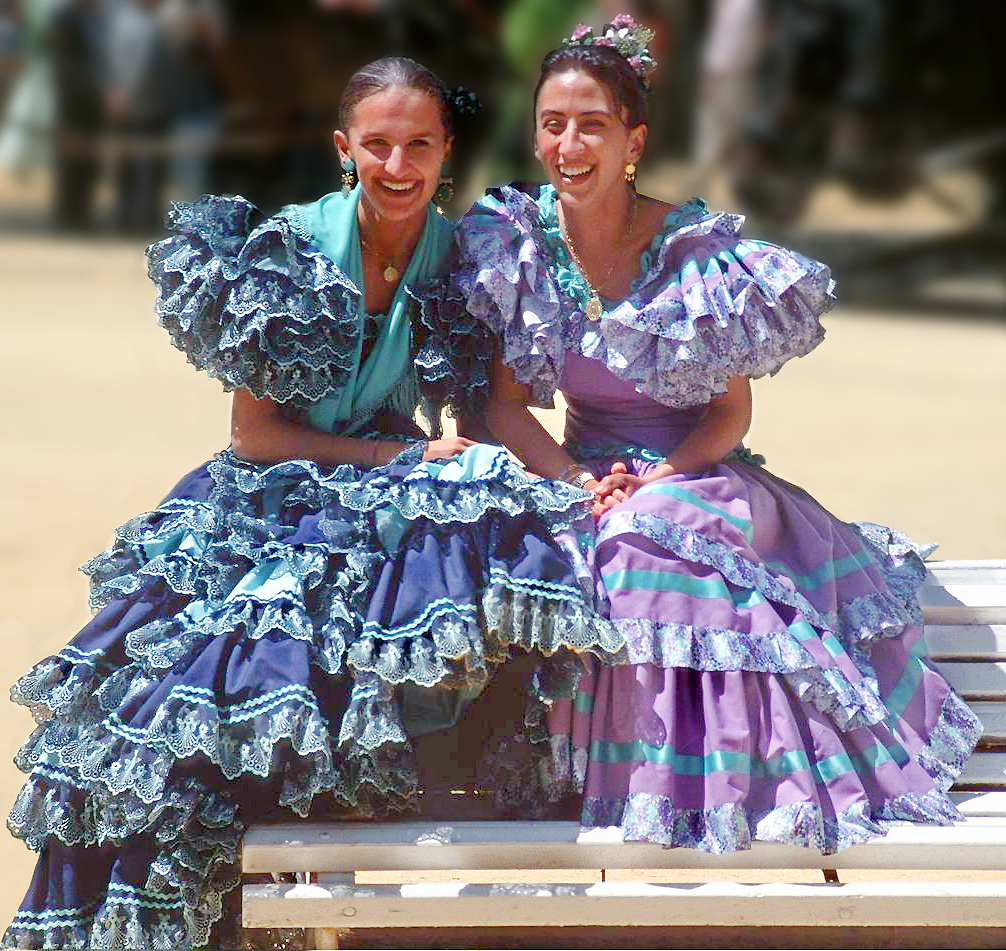
Andalusian women wearing trajes de flamenca

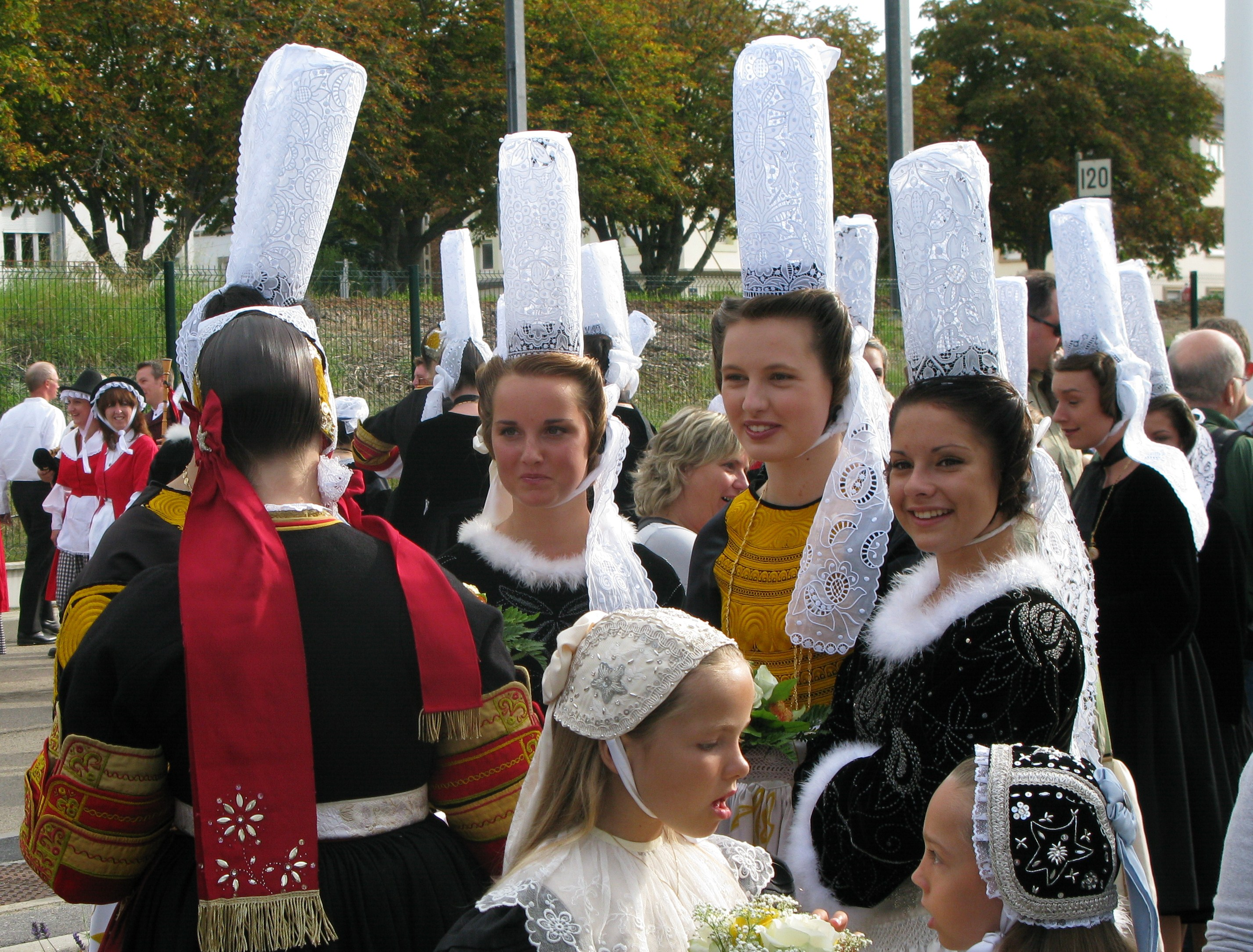
Traditional Breton costume worn by women and girls in Brittany, France

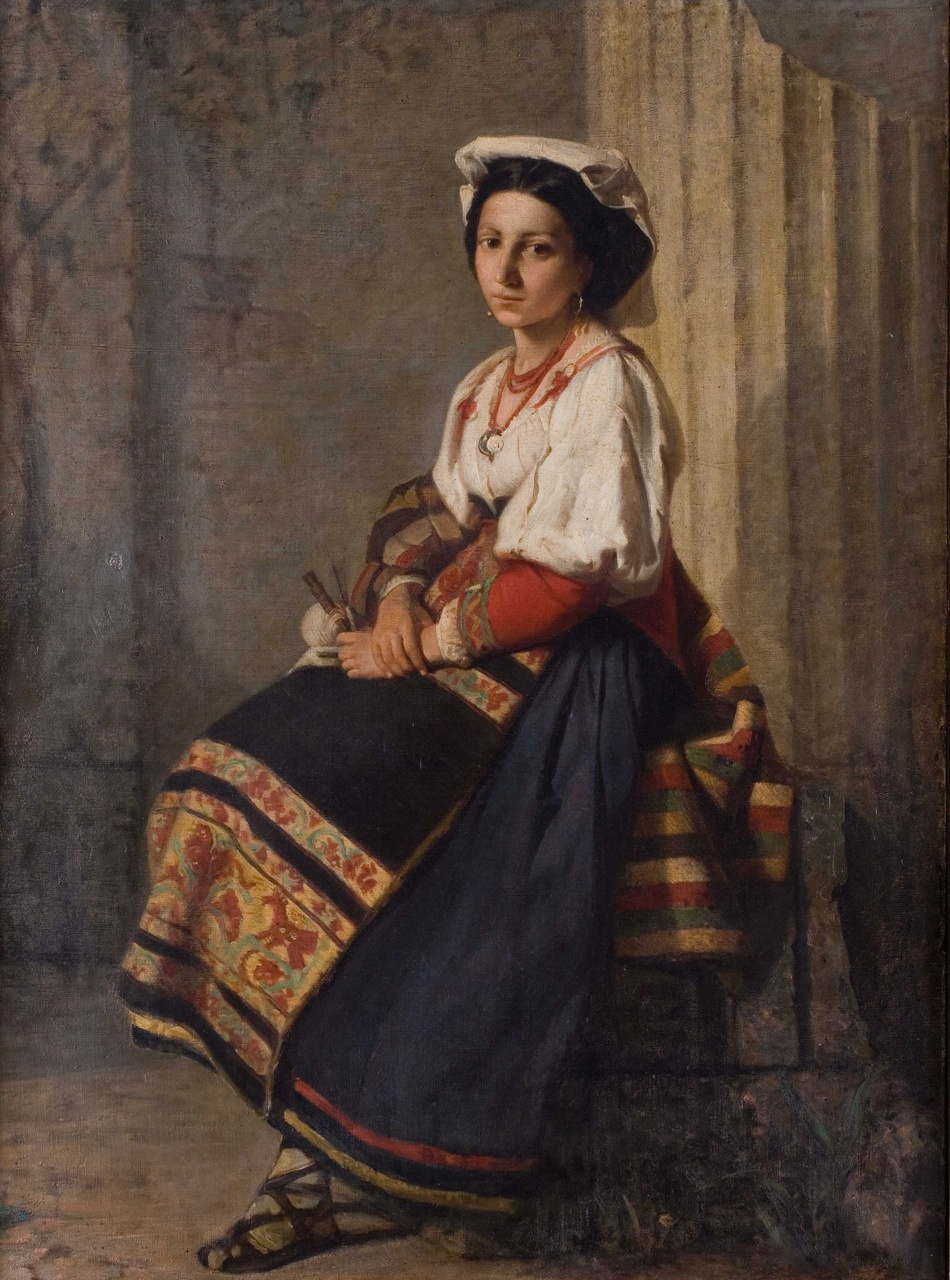
A young Italian woman in traditional Ciociarian dress (c.1869)

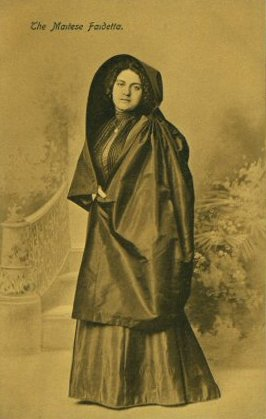
Traditional għonnella, or faldetta, once ubiquitous in Malta

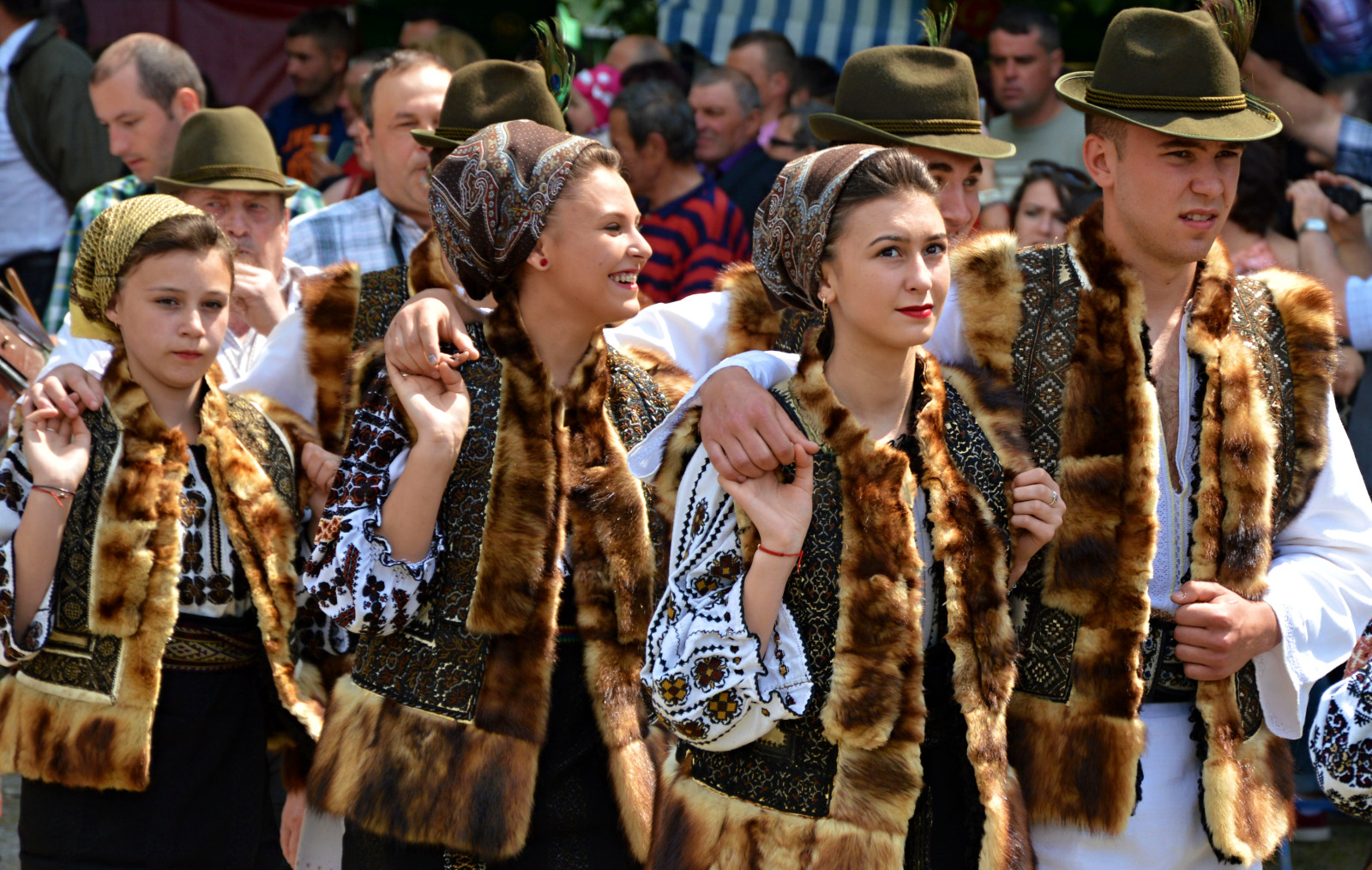
Romanian teens in traditional dress

In Portugal, each region has its own specific design of national costume. The most famous examples come from Viana do Castelo and Nazaré.

Each autonomous region in Spain has its own national costume. In Andalusia, traditional garments include the sombrero cordobés, traje de flamenca, traje de luces, and the montera. In the Basque Country, traditional dress includes the beret and espadrilles. Each island of the Canary Islands has its own style of traditional dress. In 1934, Néstor Martín-Fernández de la Torre designed a pan-island costume adopted mainly in Las Palmas on Gran Canaria. In Catalonia, traditional garments include the barretina and faixa. In Galicia, each province has its own regional costume.

Traditional garments in Andorra include the barretina and espadrilles.

Each Regions of France has a style of folk costume, varying by department. For example, Brittany has the Breton costume, which differs by department and is predominantly used in Celtic circles, pardons, and festivals. In the French Basque Country, traditional garments include the beret and espadrille.

Traditional clothing in Italy includes Italian folk dance costumes, Sardinian folk costumes, as well as coppola and Arbëreshë costumes in Sicily.

Traditional clothing in Romania is represented by its national costume.

=== Balto-Slavic nations ===
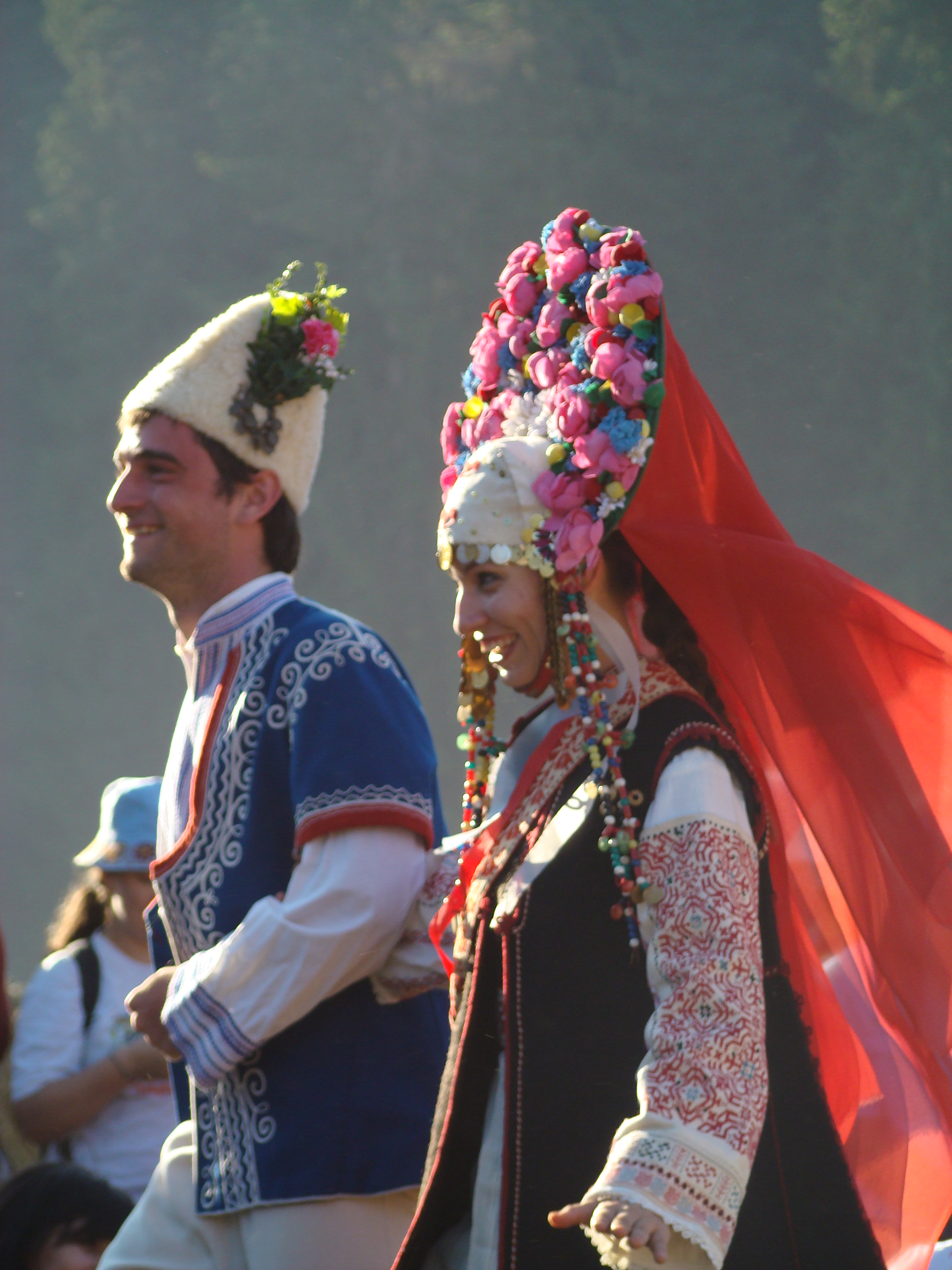
Bulgarian traditional folk costume

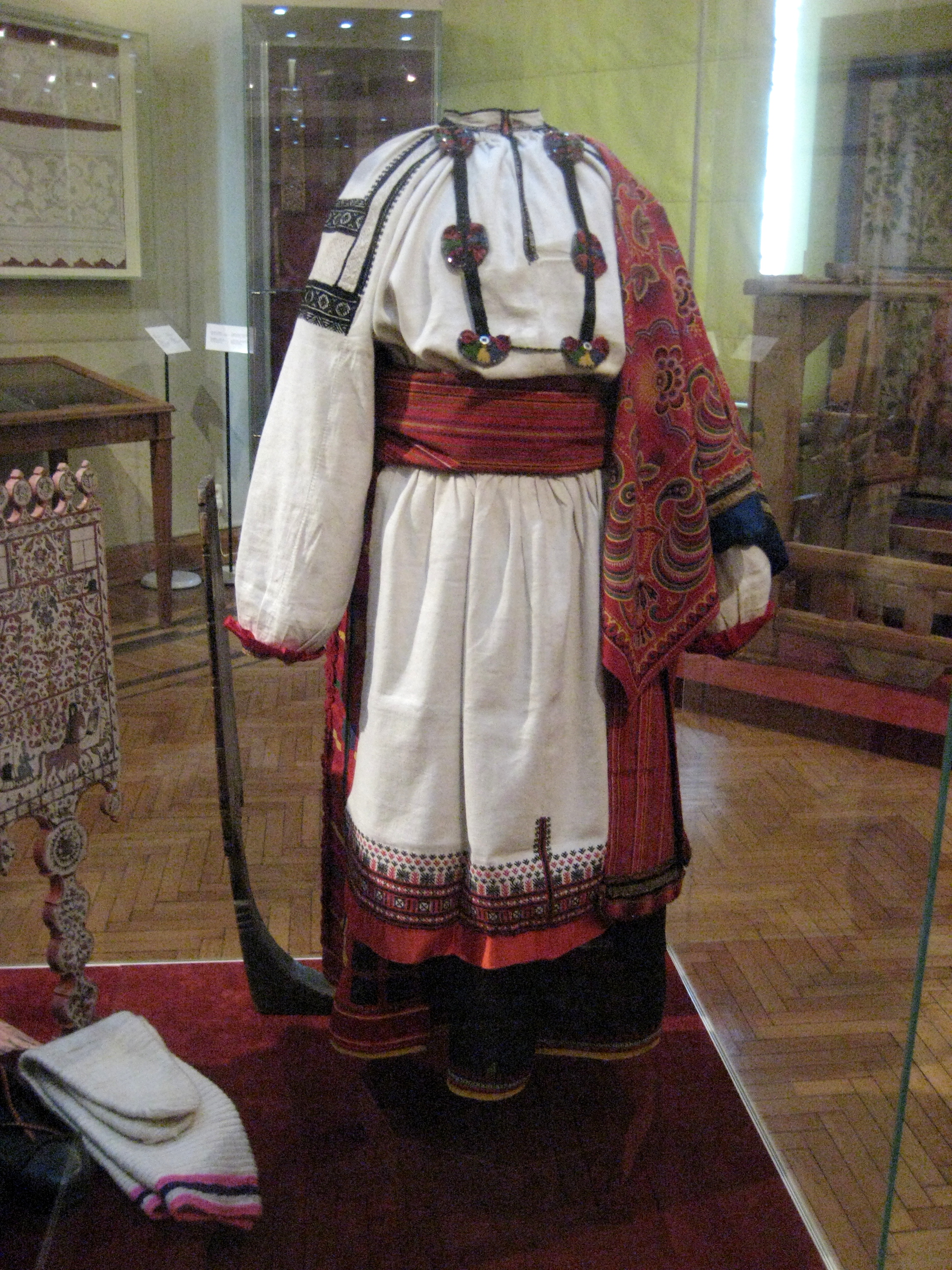
Russian festive folk dress

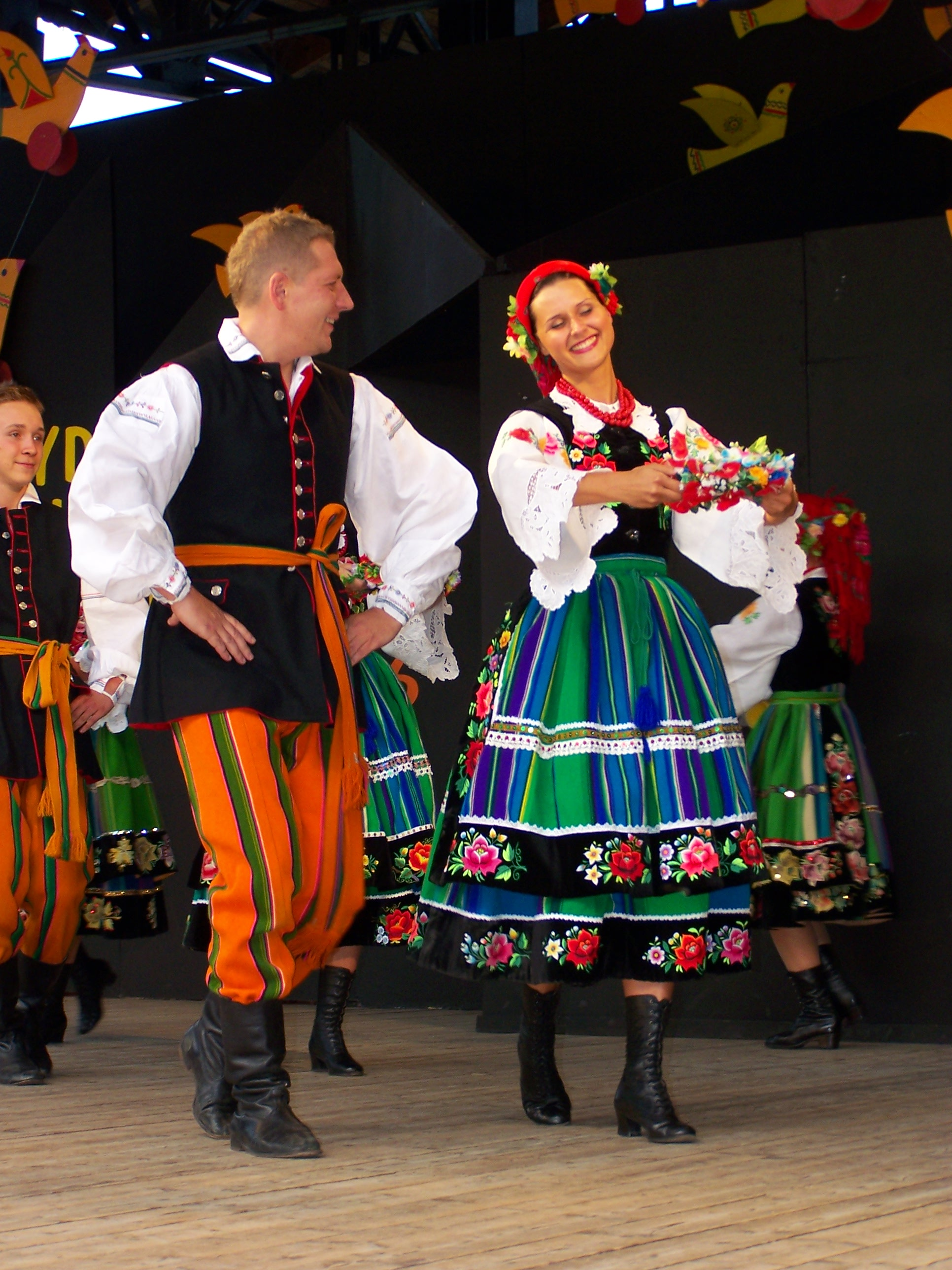
People wearing regional Łowicz-style folk dress in Poland

==== Eastern Slavic nations ====
In Belarus, traditional attire include the slutsk stash and the national type of wimple (namitka).

Many types of traditional dress exist in Russia, including bast shoes, boyar hat, ryasna, sarafan, kaftan, kokoshnik, kosovorotka, ushanka, and valenki.

In Mordovia, there are also Mordovian national costumes.

In Ukraine, traditional clothing includes the vyshyvanka, sharovary, żupan, and the Ukrainian wreath.

==== Western Slavic nations ====
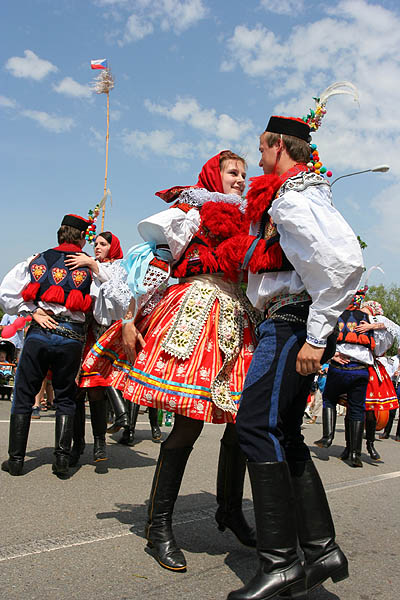
"Kroj" from Czech Moravian Slovakia during the Ride of the Kings festival

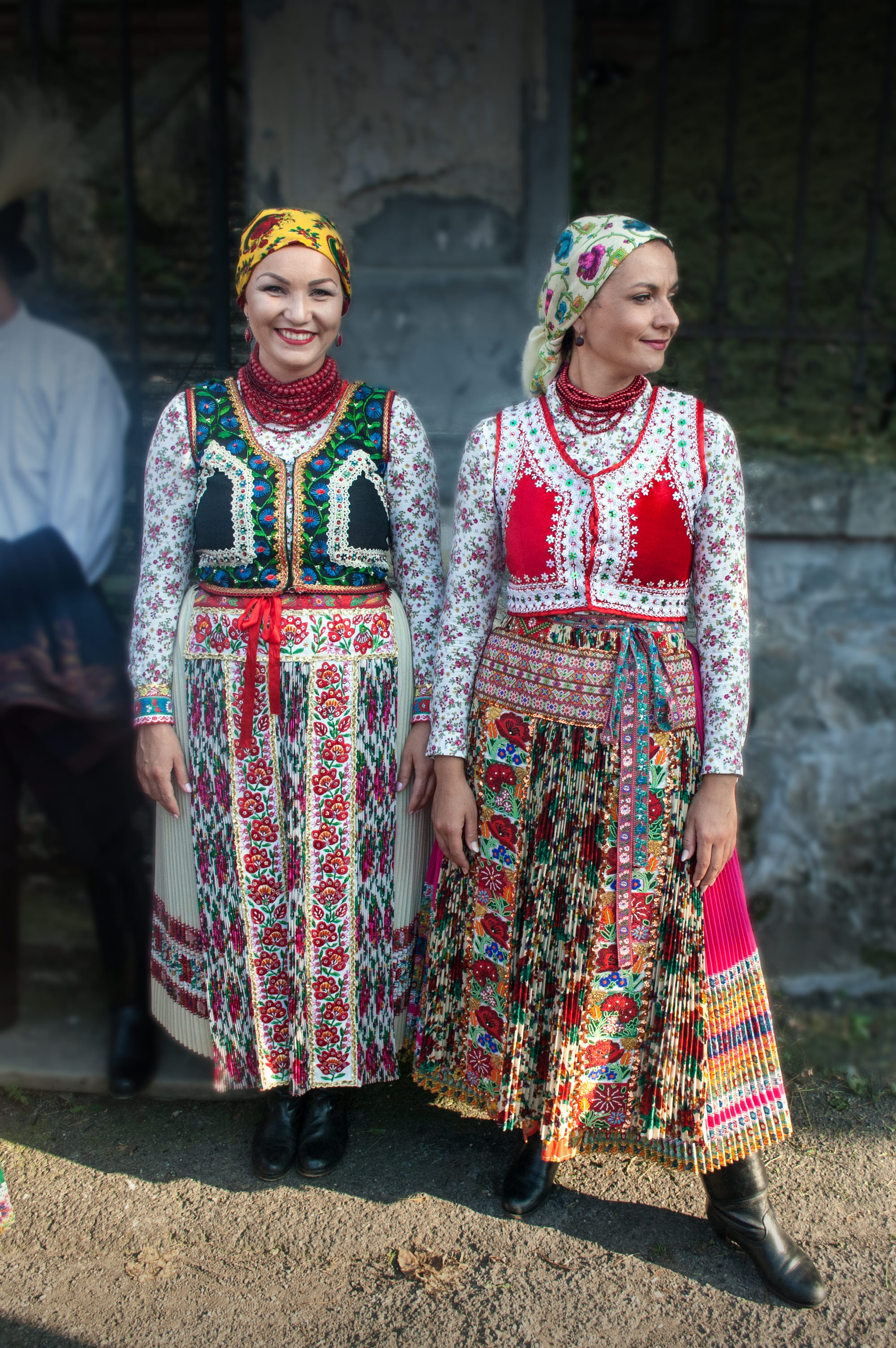
Hungarian women in folk dress

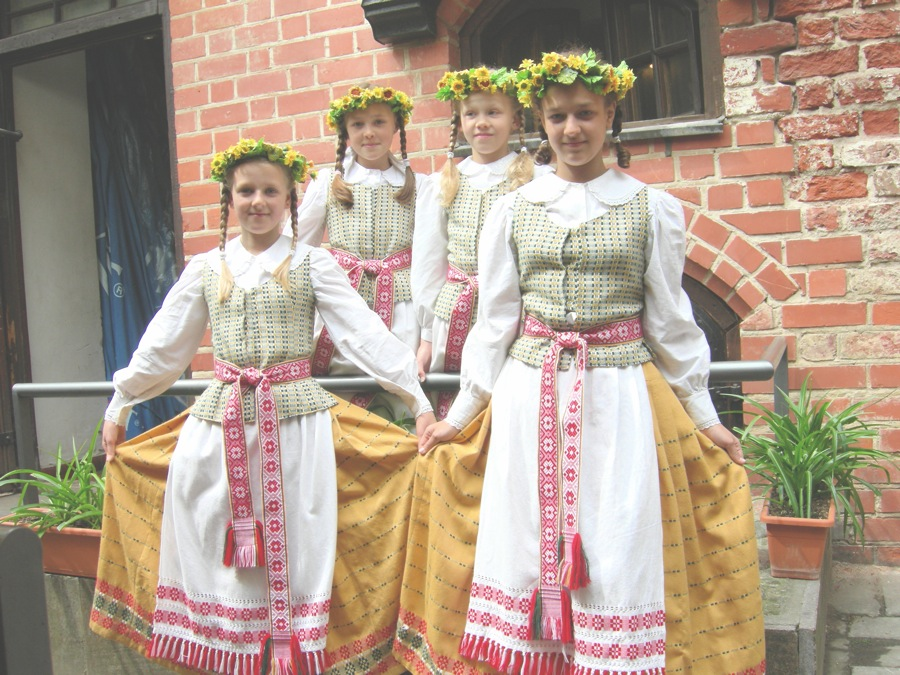
Girls wearing regional Aukštaičių-style folk dresses in Kaunas, Lithuania

In the Czech Republic and Slovakia, traditional clothing is known as kroje.

Traditional clothing in Poland includes the czamara, żupan, kontusz, and rogatywka. Regional styles include those of Łowicz, Kurpie Zielone, Biłgoraj, Lachy Sądeckie, Kraków, Podhale, Szamotuły, and Kaszuby.

==== Southern Slavic nations ====
In Bulgaria, every town has its own design of a national costume (nosia), with different types of clothing traditional for each region of the country.

Traditional dress in Croatia includes the Lika cap, and the Šibenik cap.

In Serbia, each region has a distinct style of national costume. Traditional items include the Lika cap, Montenegrin cap (shared with Montenegro), opanci, šajkača, and šubara.

Slovenian traditional clothing includes the gorenjska narodna noša.

==== Baltic nations ====
In Latvia, Latviešu tautastērpi (tautastērpi) vary by region.

In Lithuania, traditional dress differs by region. Styles include the Aukštaičių rūbai, Žemaičių rūbai, Dzūkų rūbai, Suvalkiečių rūbai, and Klaipėdos krašto rūbai (also known as Mažoji Lietuva).

=== Uralic nations ===
Traditional dress of Estonia includes rahvarõivad, also known as rahvariided.

Each region of Finland has a specific design of national costume (kansallispuku, nationaldräkt). More than 400 designs are recorded; some resemble Swedish clothing, and some reflect Russian influences. Costumes are traditionally hand-sewn from natural materials and regarded as handicraft masterpieces. Costumes are made to last decades and readily available new or second-hand.

Both female and male costumes exist, though female use is much more common. Typical female costume consists a monocolor or striped woollen skirt with white linen or cotton apron; white linen or cotton blouse; monocolor or striped woollen or cotton bodice or vest; woollen or cotton scarf on shoulders; headband for unmarried and bonnet-type headwear for married ladies; silver, bronze or pewter jewellery; leather shoes.

Male costumes consists woollen or felt trousers either long or knee-length; belt with silver or bronze decorations and traditional puukko knife; monocolor cotton or linen shirt; monocolor or striped waistcoat; short woollen or linen jacket; brimmed hat, top hat or baggy cap; leather shoes.

Finnish national costumes are considered formal attire suitable for all celebrations and occasions: decorations and medals may be accompanied. They are also popular among performing folk music and dance groups..

Sámi people wear gákti or luhkka for colder weather.

Elements of traditional dress in Hungary include pendely (linen underskirt), gatya (pleated skirt-like pants), elejbőr (sheepskin vest), kacagány (fur pelt), and ködmön (sheepskin coat).

== Oceania ==
=== Australia and New Zealand ===
In Australia, traditional attire of Aboriginal Australians includes fibrecraft-made clothing and possum cloaks. European Australian dress includes the cork hat and rural bushwear such as moleskin trousers, bush shirt, Akubra slouch hat, Driza-Bone coat, and Australian work boots. In the Torres Strait Islands, traditional dress includes the Augemwalli.

In New Zealand, Māori traditional garments include the piupiu, korowai, and kakahu huruhuru. Traditional attire for New Zealand Europeans includes the Swanndri bush jacket, slouch hat, walk shorts with knee-high socks, and black singlets with rugby shorts.

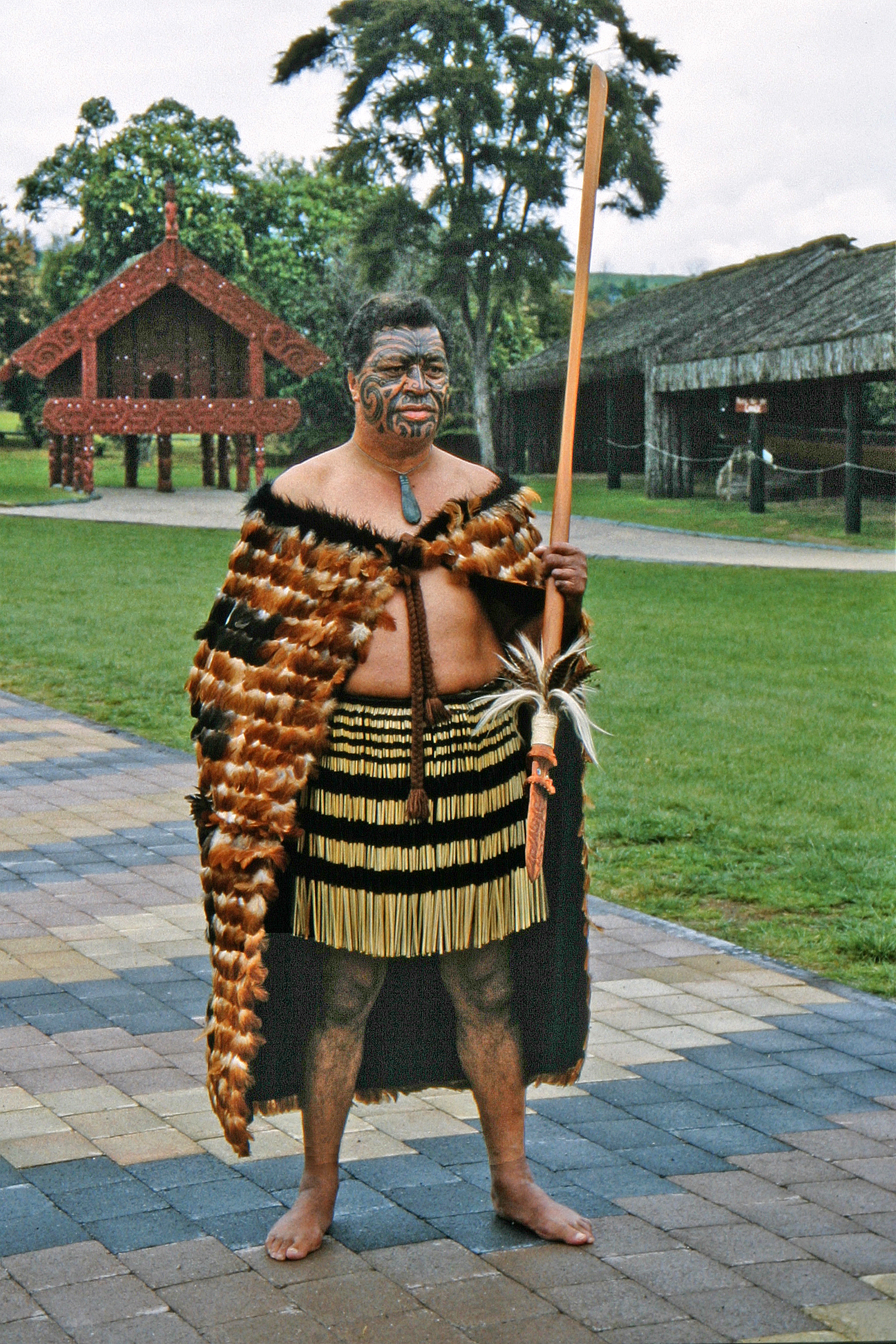
Māori man wearing a korowai and piupiu

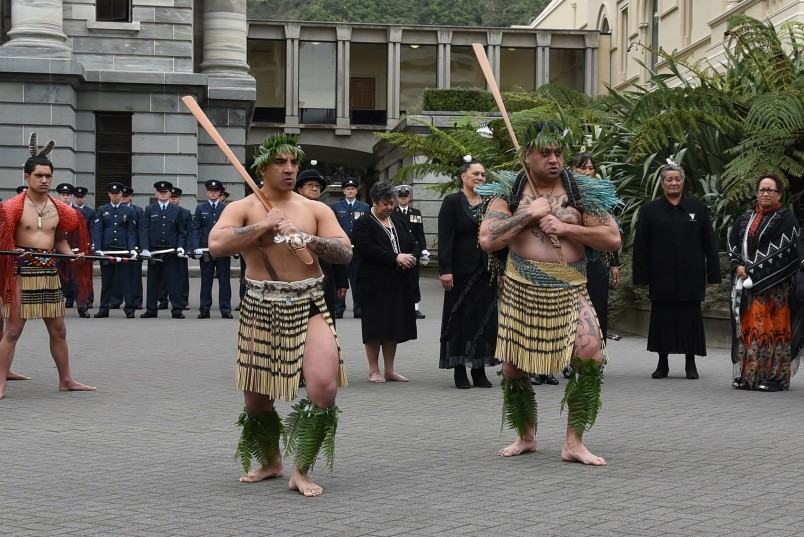
A kapa haka performing the warrior challenge in traditional piupiu at the swearing in of the 21st Governor-General

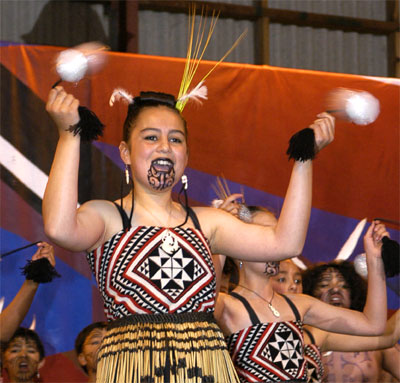
Māori poi performance in traditional dress

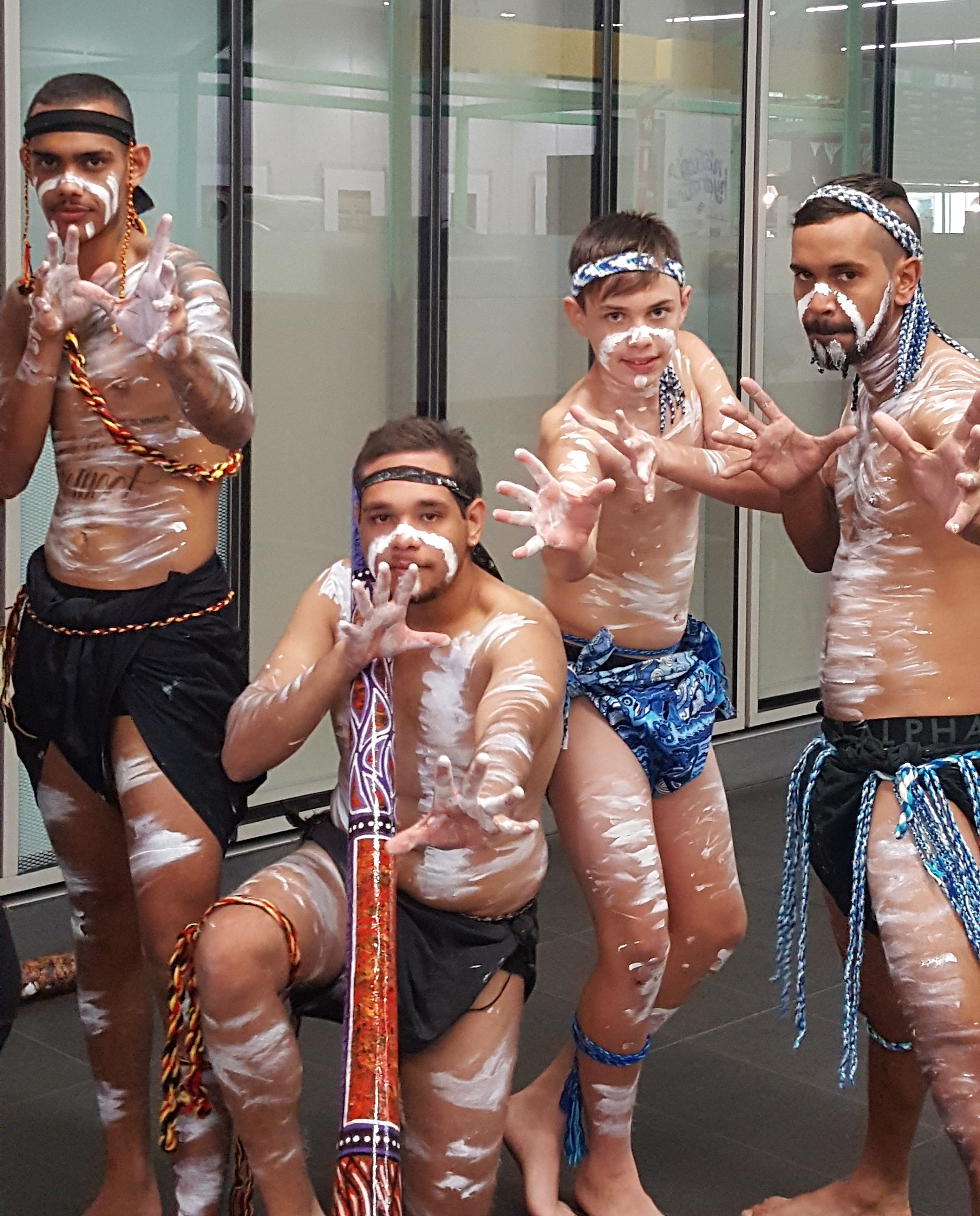
Noongar traditional dancers in Perth

=== Melanesia ===
In Fiji, traditional garments include the sulu, chamba (sulu i ra), tapa cloth (called masi), and i-sala. The kuta, made in the village of Dama in Bua Province, is another traditional item. Also traditional are sarees, shalwar kameez, and other Indo-Fijian traditional and religious clothing originating in South Asia.

In New Caledonia, traditional dress includes the manou and robes mission.

In Papua New Guinea, traditional dress includes the meri blaus, lap-lap, koteka, bilum (traditional string bags), and grass covers.

In the Solomon Islands, traditional attire includes the tapa cloth, grass skirts, kap-kap, and breastplates called tema, tambe, or tepatu. For women, traditional attire includes the kabilato and aba obi; for men, traditional attire includes the fo'osae.

In Vanuatu, traditional clothing includes the Aelan dress and the lap-lap.

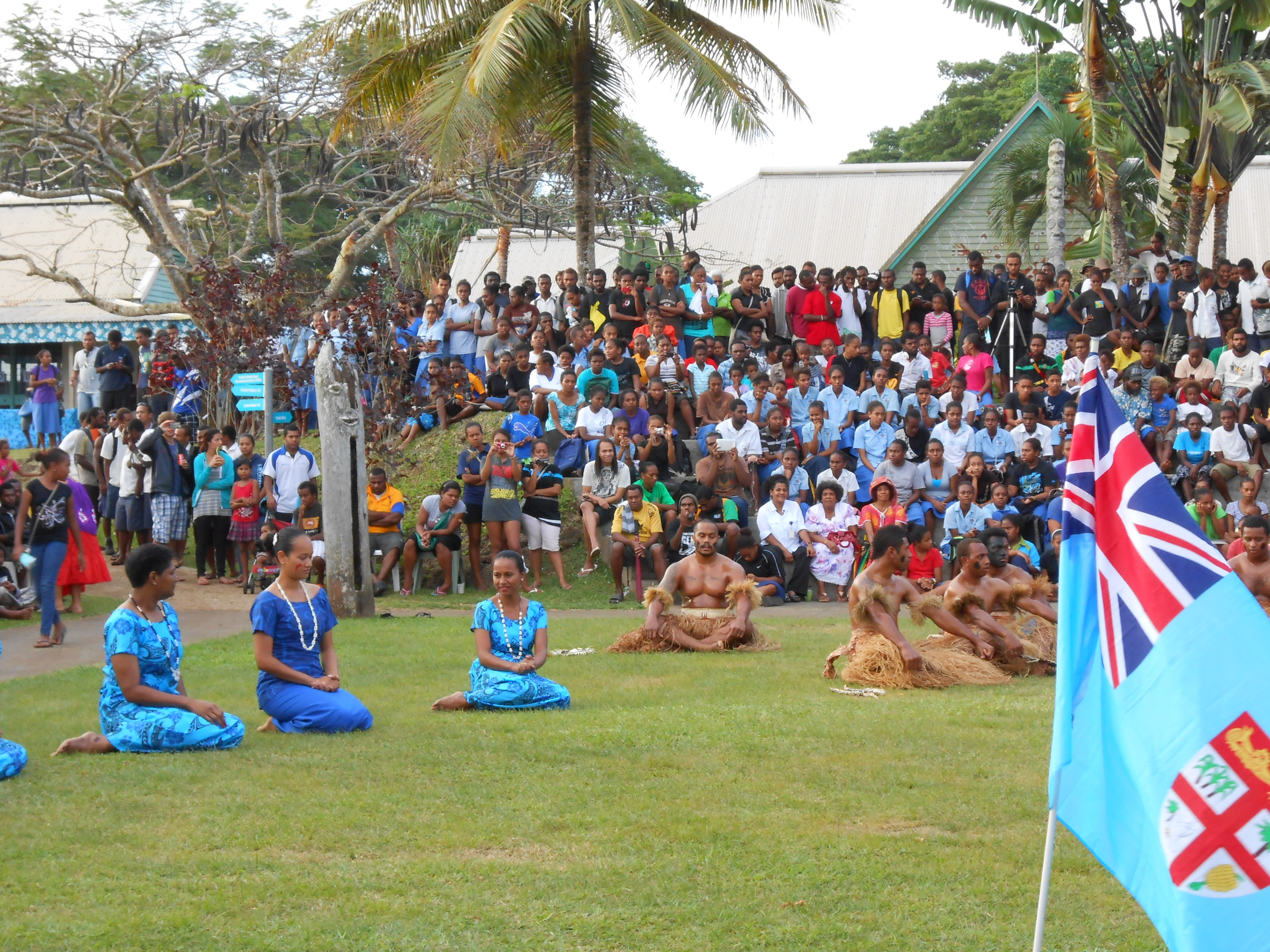
People in traditional dress in Fiji

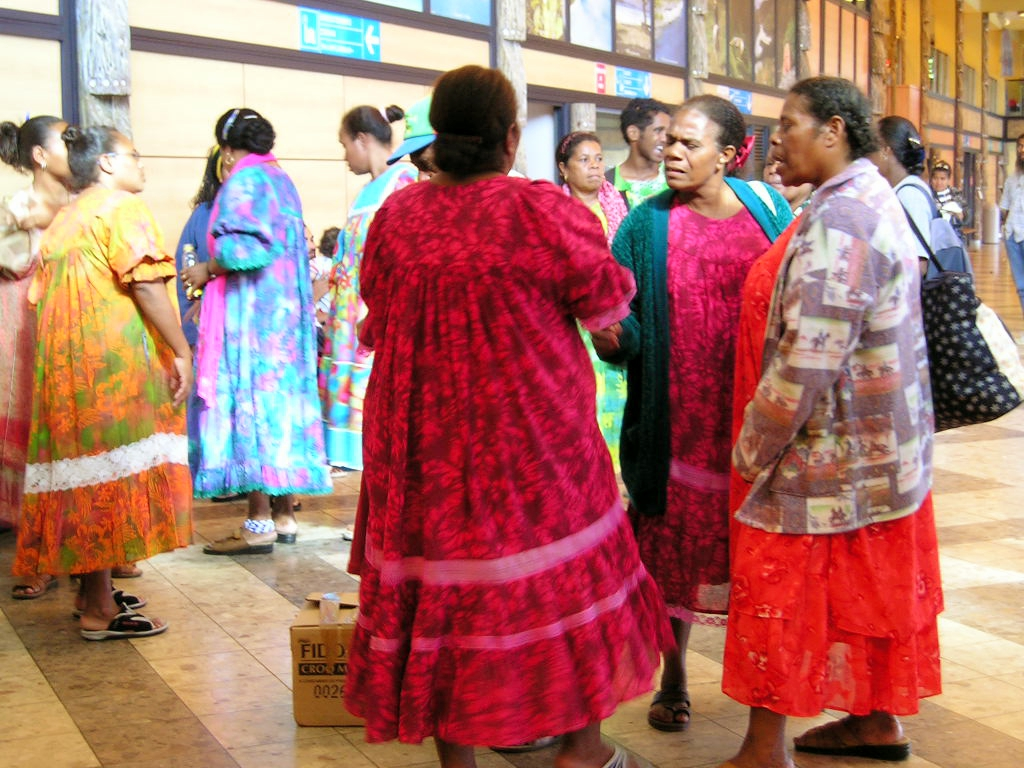
Kanak women wearing Robes mission

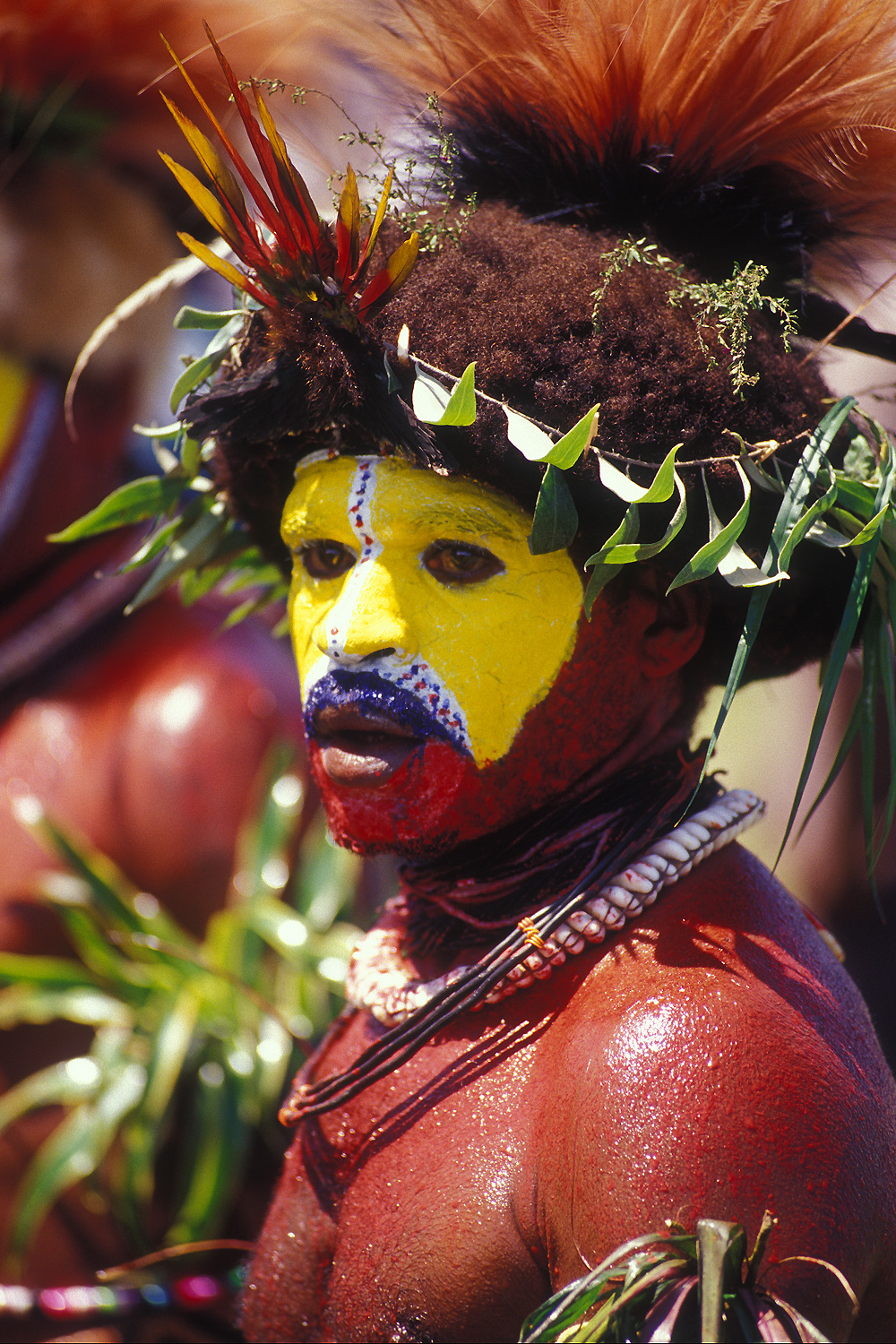
Huli wigman from Papua New Guinea in festive regalia

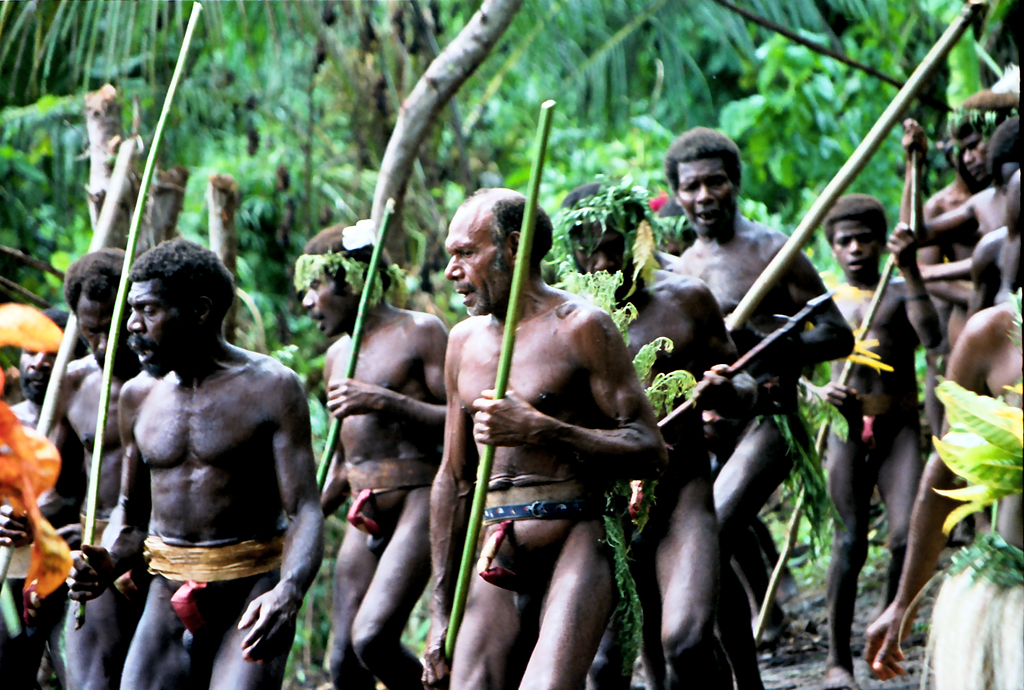
Men wearing traditional nambas during a N'gol ceremony on Pentecost Island, Vanuatu (1992)

=== Micronesia ===
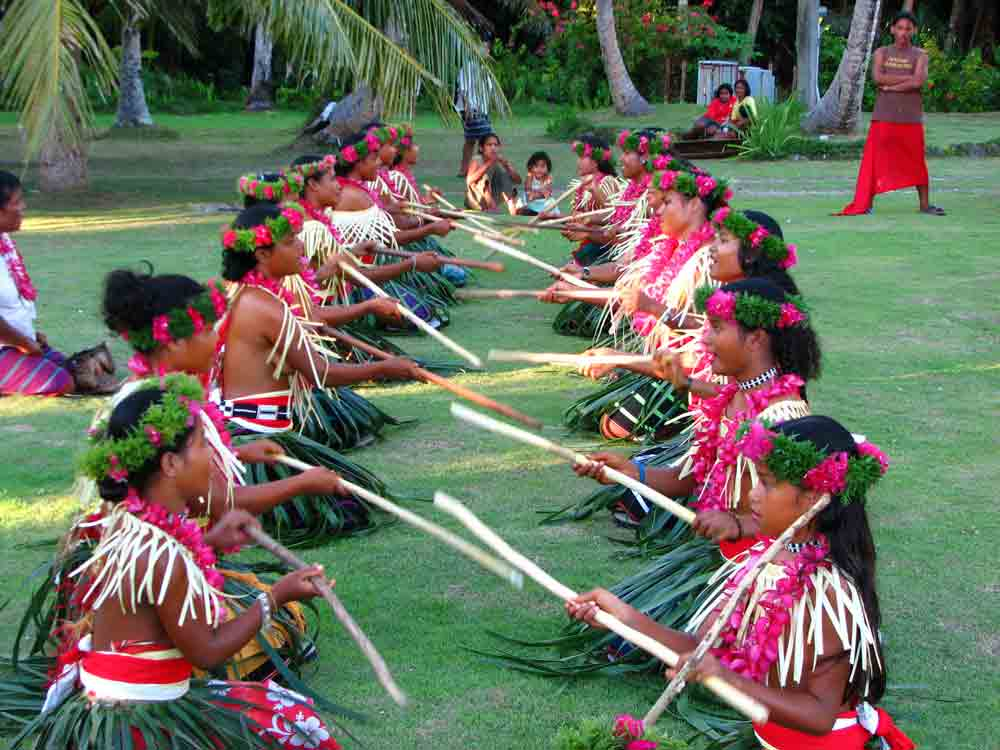
People performing a welcome ceremony in traditional dress on the Ulithi atoll

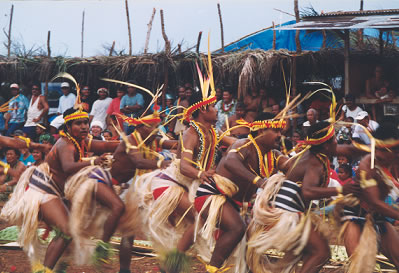
Yapese men in traditional dress celebrating Yap Day

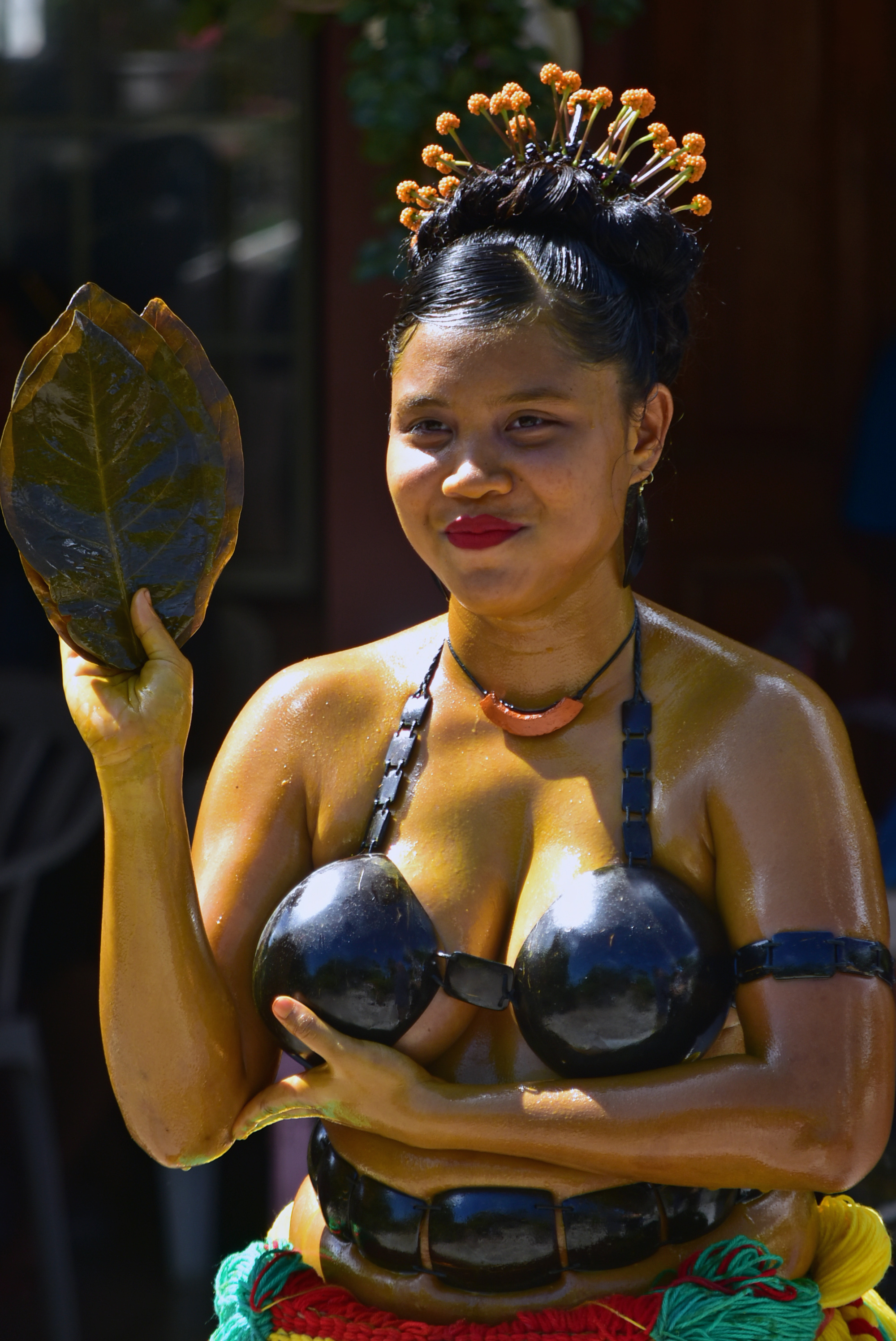
A ceremony in Palau for a woman giving birth to her first child

In the Federated States of Micronesia and Palau et alibi, traditional dress includes the lap-lap for men and grass skirts for women.

=== Polynesia ===
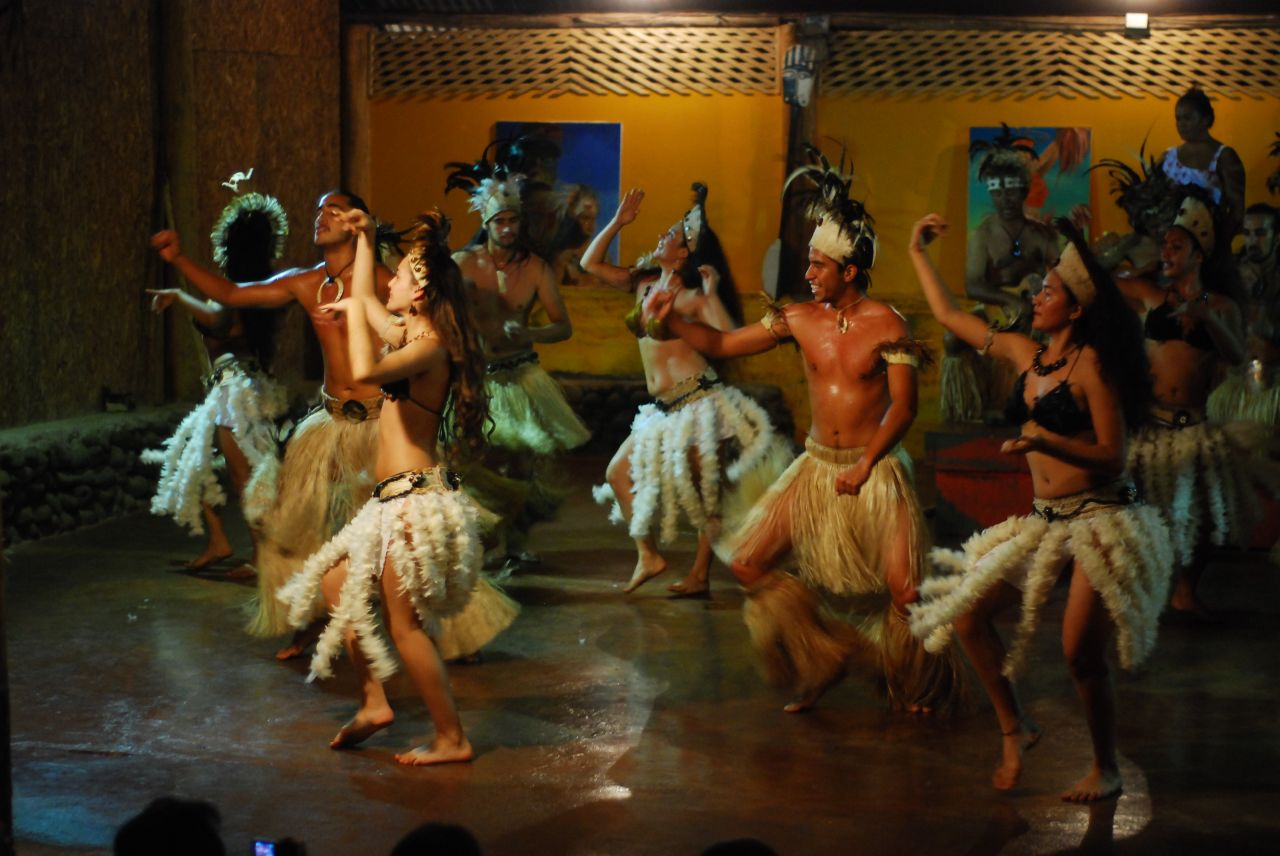
Rapa Nui dancers (Easter Island)

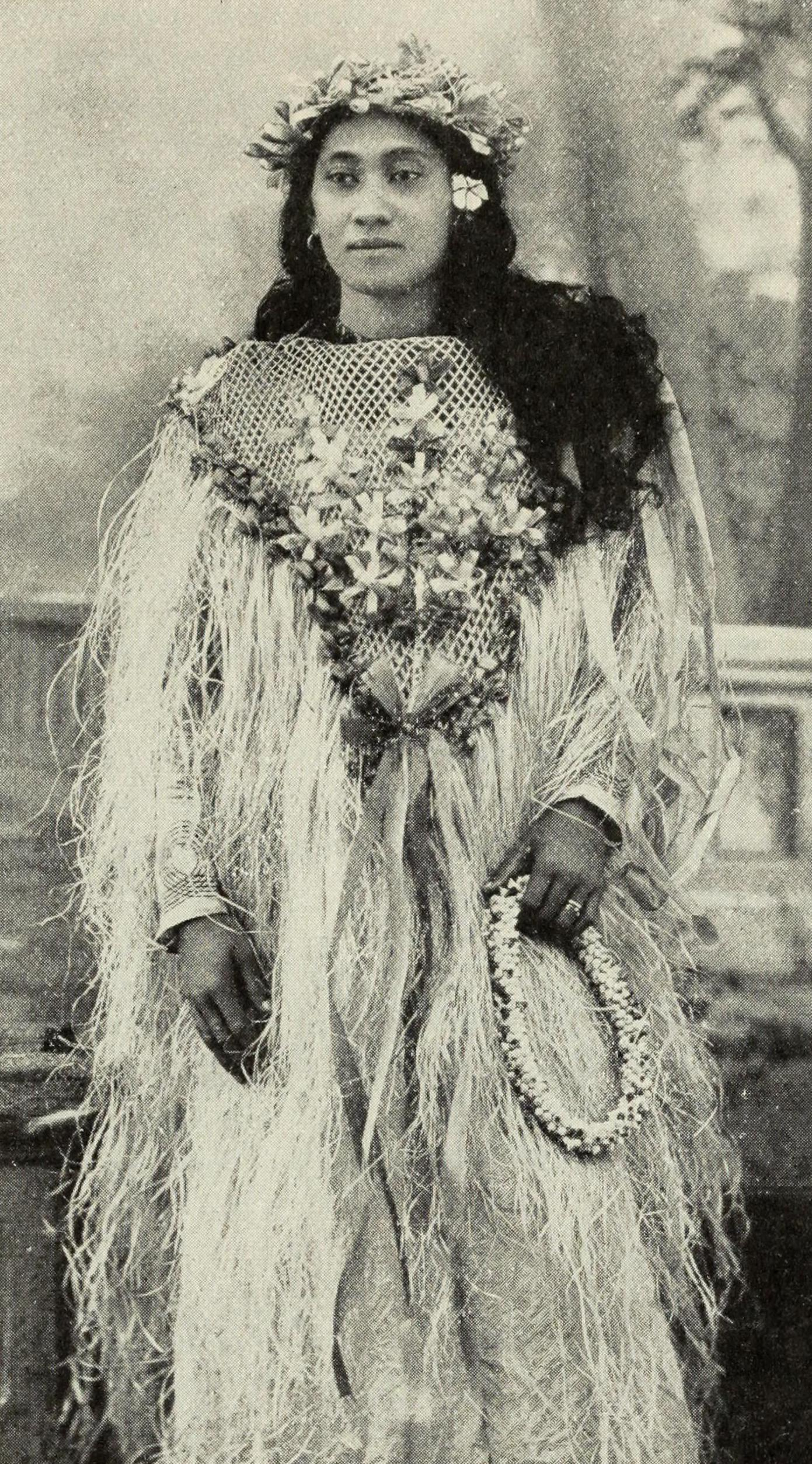
Tahitian woman in festive regalia (c. 1906)

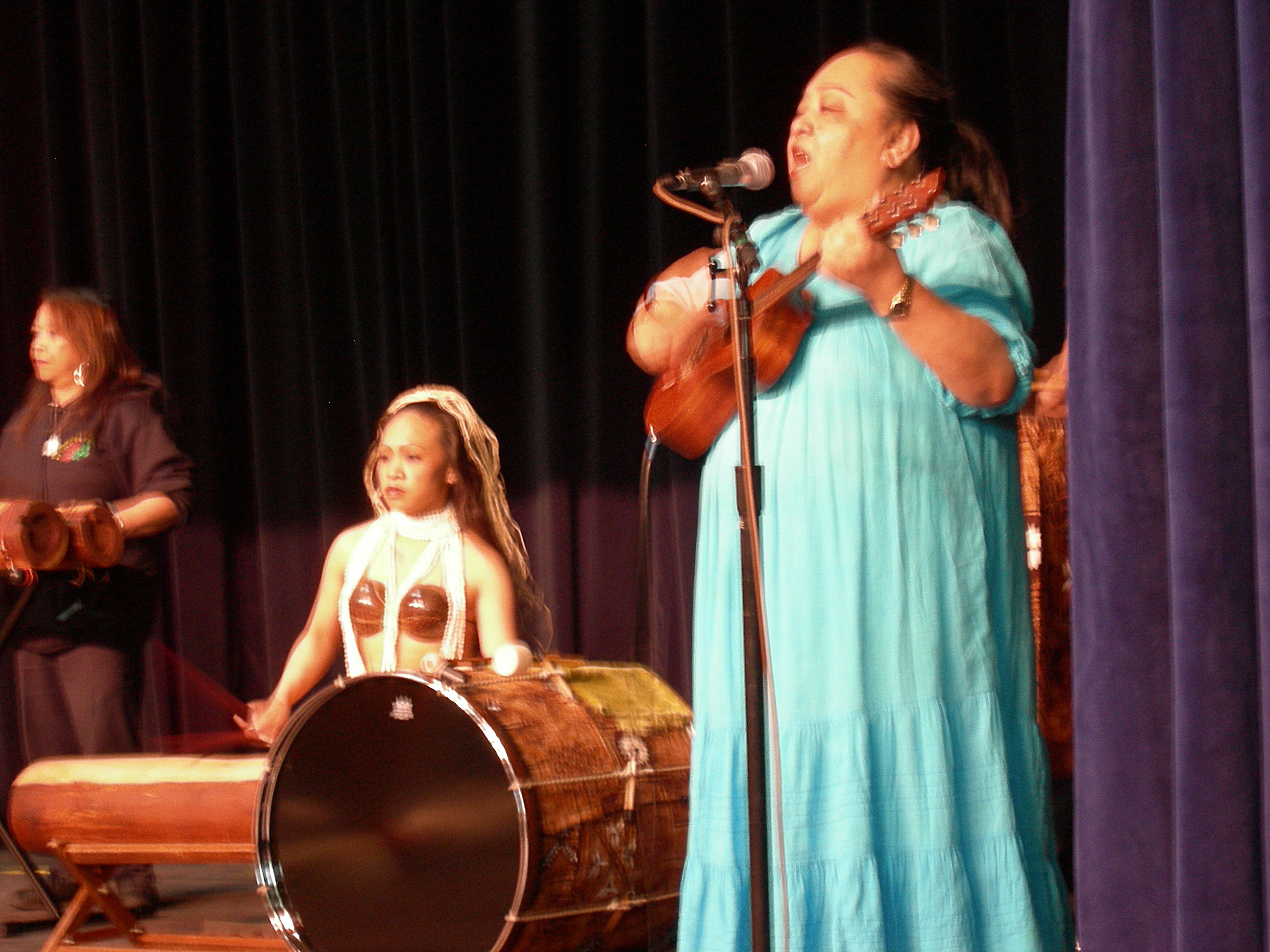
Hawaiian musicians wearing traditional dress, including a muumuu

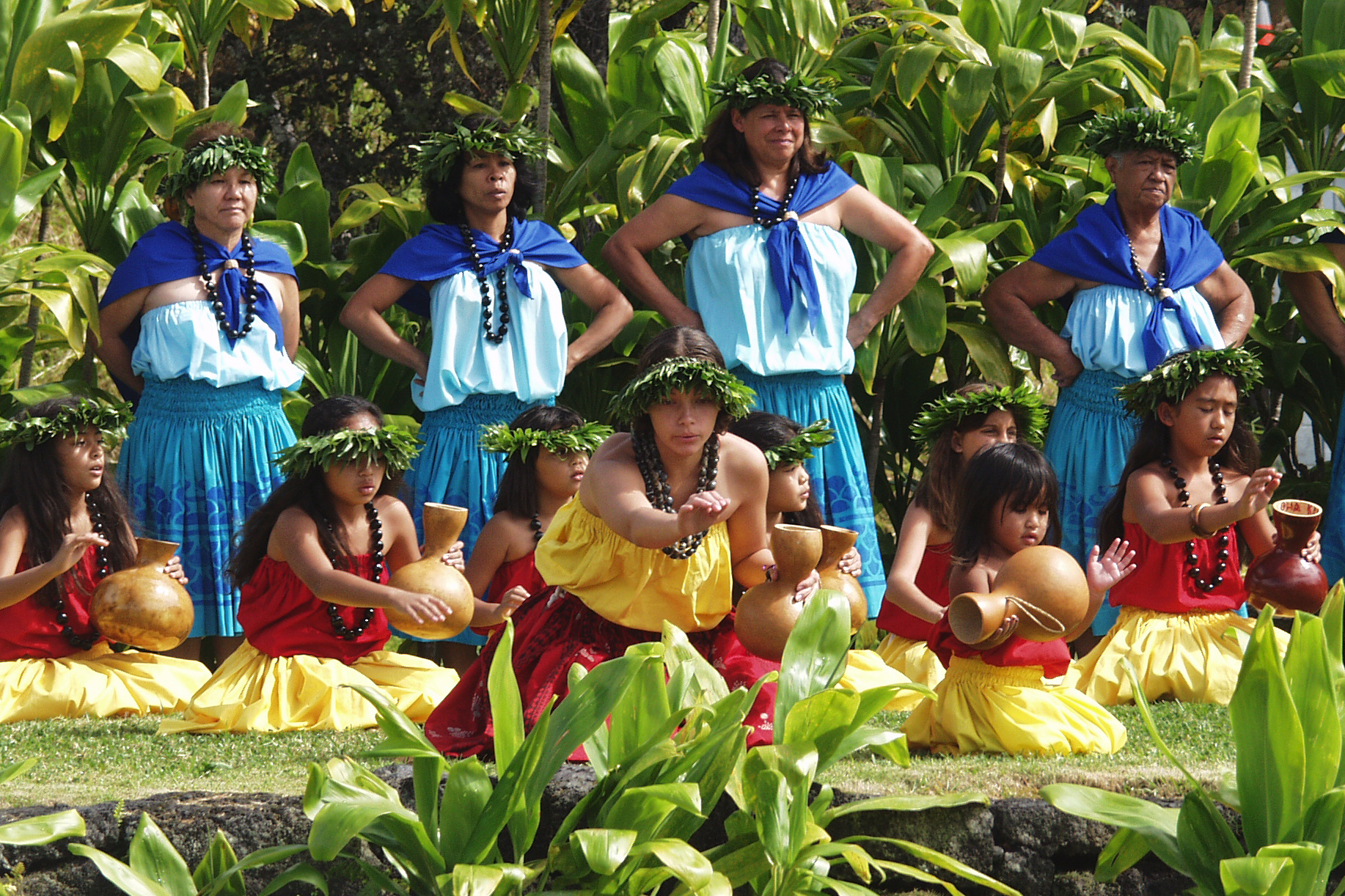
Hula kahiko performance at the pa hula in Hawaii Volcanoes National Park

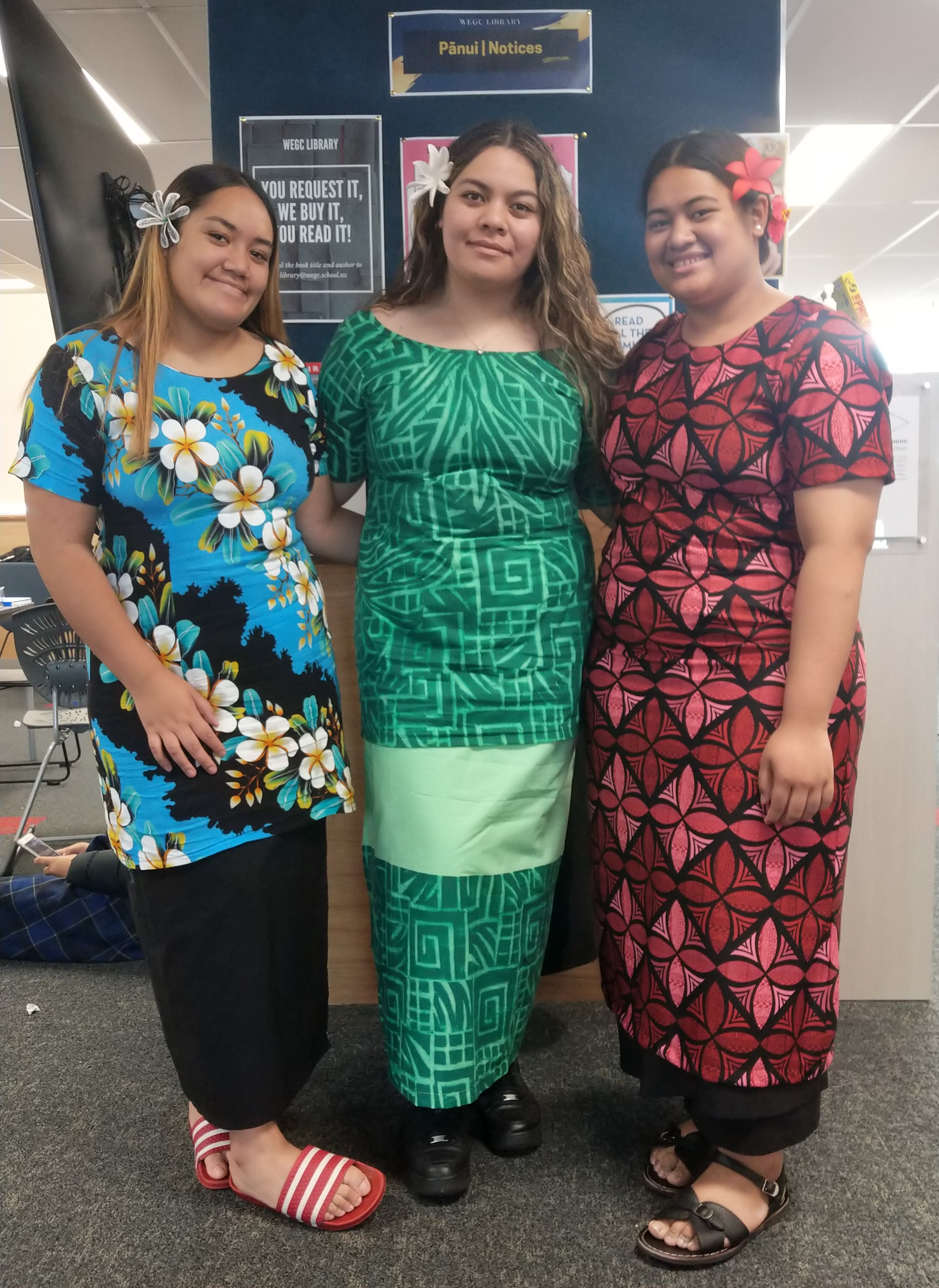
Samoan women wearing puletasi

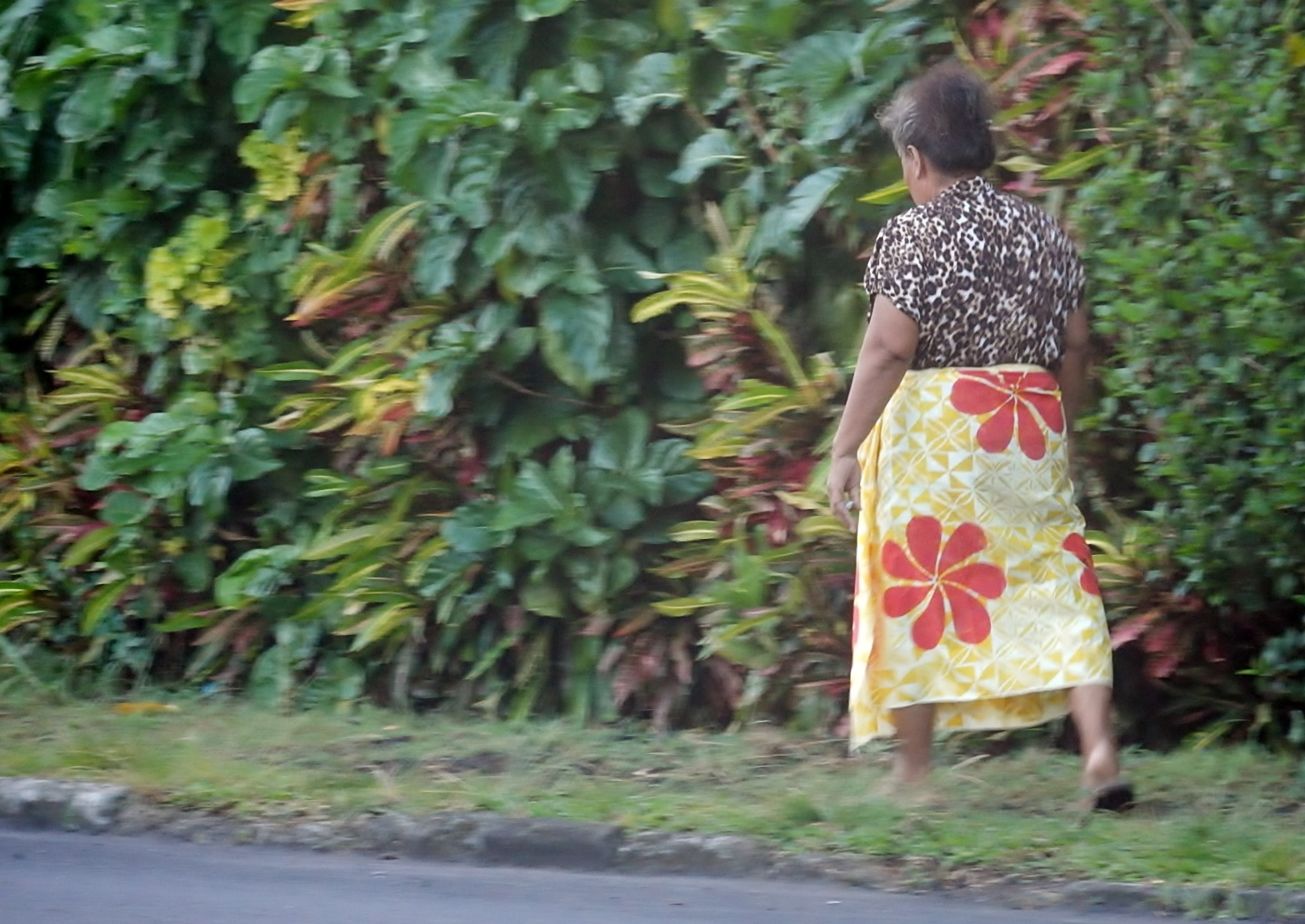
Samoan woman wearing a lavalava in Apia

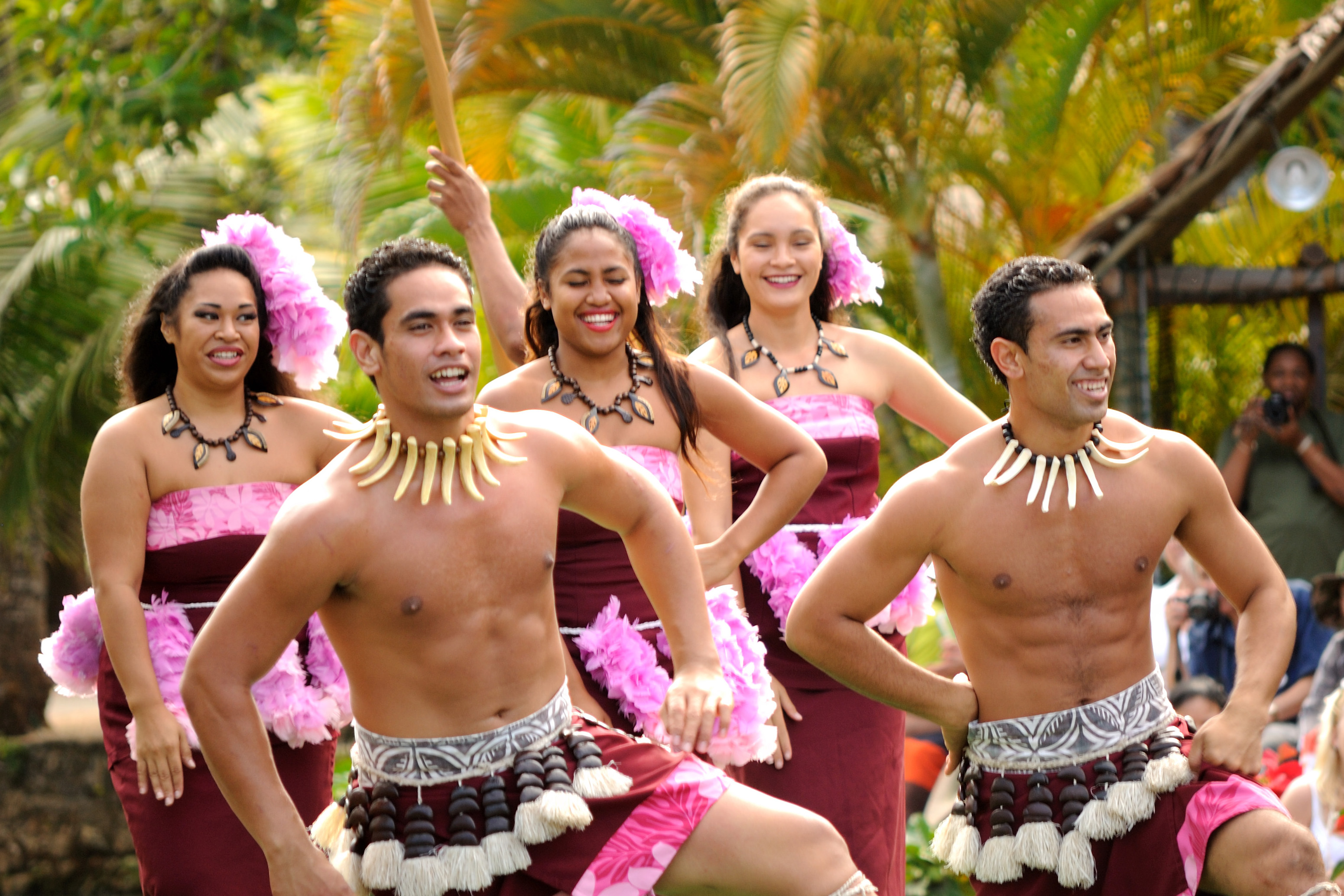
Samoan canoe performers in traditional dress

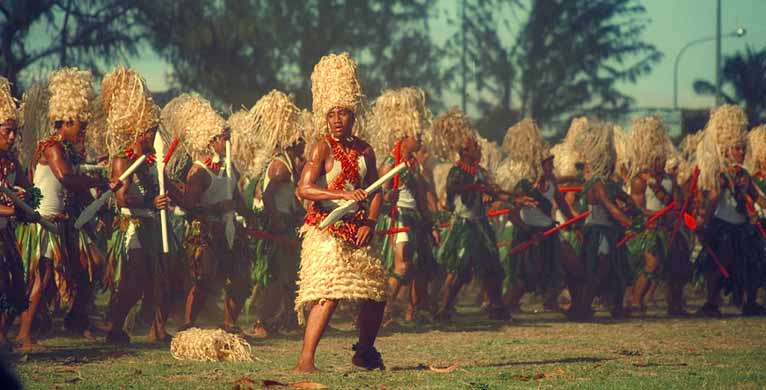
Tongan college students performing the kailao dance (1988)

Tongan newlyweds wearing their wedding taʻovala

Young boys wearing traditional Tongan tupenu

In the Cook Islands and French Polynesia et alibi, traditional dress includes the pareo.

In Hawaii, traditional garments include the holokū, and pāʻū skirts made of kapa or grass. Men traditionally wear the malo (loincloth). The Aloha shirt and muumuu are also traditional clothing.

In Samoa, traditional clothing includes the lavalava, puletasi, and 'ie toga.

In Tonga, traditional dress includes the tupenu, ta'ovala, and tapa cloth.
