= Kiekie =

Kiekie is a Polynesian word, in some languages written as ʻieʻie. It can refer to:

- Kiekie (plant), Freycinetia banksii, in New Zealand
- Kiekie (clothing), an ornamental girdle around the hips, especially worn by women in Tonga
- Kiekie (spider), a genus of wandering spiders
