= Tongan funerals =

Funerals in Tonga, despite the large Christian influence they have received over the last 150 years or so, are still very much a traditional affair and an important part of the culture of Tonga, especially if it concerns the death of a member of the royal family or a high chief.

== Clothing ==
The influence of Christianity on anga fakatonga (Tongan culture) is seen in the black clothing worn by mourners during the mourning period. The period of mourning, and thus the obligation to wear black, differs depending on how closely related a mourner is to the deceased. For an acquaintance it may be a few days; for a distant relation it may be a few weeks, whilst for close relatives the mourning period may last for up to a year. This obligation remains irrespective of whether a taʻovala (mat tied around the waist) is worn or not. For those in uniform a black armband is allowed instead.

When appearing in public during this period, a taʻovala is much recommended, and during this time it is traditional to wear a mourning taʻovala. When attending the funeral itself, wearing of a mourning taʻovala is obligatory. What kind of taʻovala is worn depends on the relationship to the deceased. Close relatives who are "inferior", in kinship terms, or "brother's" side, wear old, coarse, torn mats, sometimes even old floor mats. These are the relatives who do the hard, dirty work of preparing the ʻumu at the funeral. Relatives on the "sister's side" wear fine mats, often mats which are family heirlooms. Those who are not related at all to the deceased should wear fine mats that are fakaʻahu, or smoked over a fire until they are a rich mahogany color.

Over the coarse mats, loose strips of pandanus may be worn, as a kiekie (ornamental girdle). This is the fakaaveave ("like an asparagus"), and wearing one is also a sign of respect. In the later days of the mourning period, the fakaaveave can be worn alone without the bulky taʻovala.

In the case of the death of a king, culturally everyone is considered inferior, and only the coarse mats are worn. The taʻovala worn by close relatives can be particularly large.

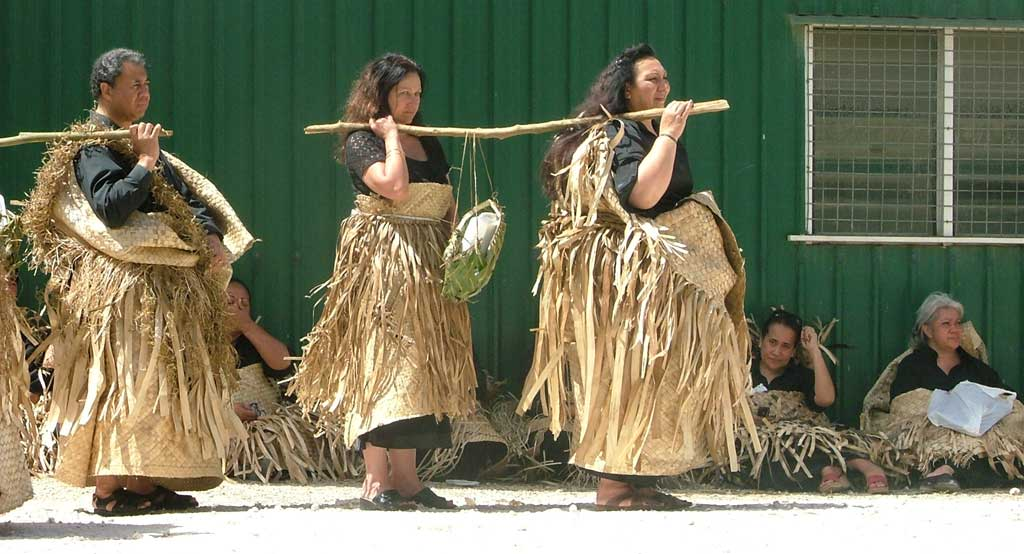
The Tuita family present their haʻamo for the king Tāufaʻāhau Tupou IV's funeral ceremonies. Note their huge taʻovala and the fakaaveave over it

== Vigil ==
As soon as the death has occurred all family members will be notified, nowadays often by a radio message, and they are supposed to come to the putu (funeral rites). In Tongan culture no excuses are accepted for missing these rites. For friends or distantly related members it is enough that they come, pay their respect to the dead, bring a small gift for the widow (or close relatives), have their share of food and then leave until the actual burial. The household of the deceased is supposed to provide a meal, or meals if the putu are long, to all mourners. In case of a large family, this is a huge and expensive operation with a big ʻumu, and much food.

Closer family will bring huge ngatu and other traditional gifts, and are supposed to stay for the ʻapō (night vigil). Usually a big tent (some companies are specialised in hiring out such tents) is erected in the garden, and there the people sit the whole night singing religious songs. This is normally one night, but in case of a high chief the ʻapō can last a whole week.

== Burial itself ==
The burial itself starts with a church service, the number of reverends/priests, the number of their sermons and therefore the duration of the service is proportional to the rank of the deceased. After that all parade to that cemetery where the family has a piece of ground. A brass-band may lead the procession. If the deceased is a high ranking civil servant, it will be the police brass-band.

Meanwhile, men and boys of the family have dug a grave, and the coffin is lowered in there. Nowadays the grave is usually sealed with concrete. After that, all leave, although the closest relatives may stay at the grave for the next 10 days.

== Death of a king ==
In Tonga, the monarch is still considered so sacred that no one may touch him. Thus the Haʻa Tufunga clan is charged with funeral duties for, though they claim descent from a brother (Māliepō) of the first Tongan king, they are not part of the Tongan ranking system because of their Samoan ancestry. It is headed by Lauaki, the title of the royal undertaker, and only his men, known as the nima tapu ("sacred hands") may touch the dead king's remains.

The Tuʻi Tonga were buried in the langi (burial mounds), most of them in Lapaha. The current dynasty of kings, the Tuʻi Kanokupolu are buried at Malaʻekula. The ancient kings were buried at Malaʻelahi on the royal island of ʻUiha in Haʻapai, Tonga. There is a groundwater well on ʻUiha that is said to turn blood red right before the passing of a royal family member called Tafetafetōtō, or "blood wash". The royal tomb of Malaʻe Lahi on the Tongan island of ʻUiha is an ideal example of how the built environment validates symbolic claims of status, authority and power. The tomb embodies traditional symbols of status that were the customary right of the Tuʻi Tonga, the highest sacred chiefs of the country, in almost every aspect of the tomb's construction. However, it was not clear whether the tomb was built or simply rebuilt by Taufaʻahau, to which it is associated.

== Aftermath ==
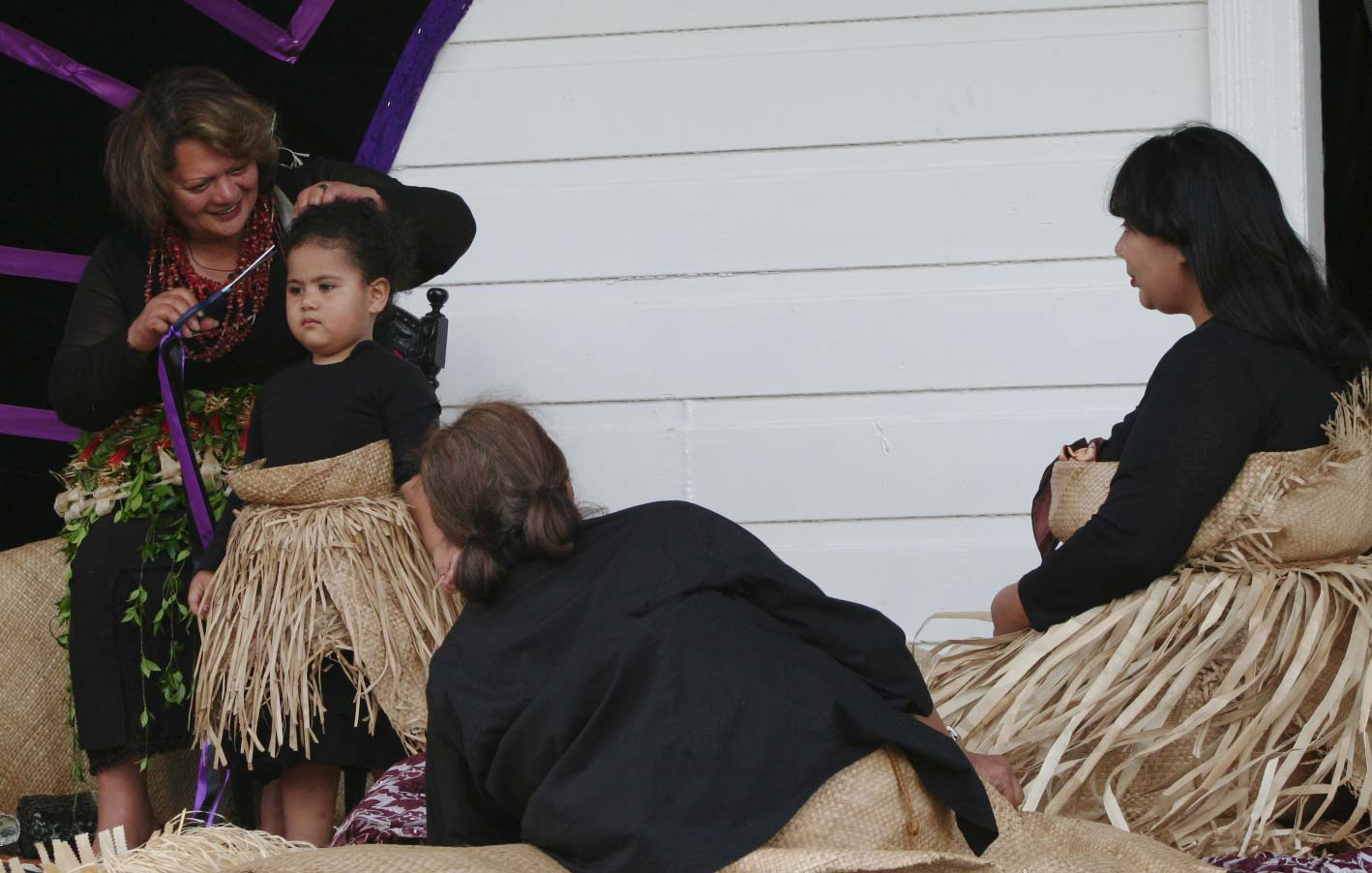
After the tenth day, female relatives cut their hair. Here Princess Phaedra Fusituʻa has her hair cut, while her mother, Lupepauʻu, watches from the right. As the hair and the head (especially of royalty) are considered taboo, it must be done by someone outside the Tongan ranking system, such as Māori Princess Heeni Katipa (far left).

In case of an important chief, for ten days after the interment relatives and friends of the deceased bring food from the ʻumu to the deceased's closest family members. Such food is always put in baskets, woven from coconut palm fronds. It is a tradition in this situation not to carry the baskets in the hands, but from a pole over the shoulders. This is called the haʻamo (Compare with: Haʻamonga ʻa Maui).

During the initial mourning period the mourners (especially the women) are not supposed to do their hair, but let it hang loose and unattended. At the end of the ten days it will be officially cut. In pre-Christian times, in addition, a part of the little finger (or any other finger if the little finger was already consumed on earlier occasions) would be cut off. That many people were missing their little fingers was directly noted by Abel Tasman in 1643. Even as late as 1865 Tēvita ʻUnga, King George Tupou I's son, the crown prince, was described as "minus 2 fingers, cut off as a tribute to some deceased relatives" (as well as having lost one eye).

This tenth day is known as the pongipongi tapu (sacred morning) and features a taumafa kava (royal kava ceremony), which is a good time to bestow the chiefly title (if any) of the deceased onto his heir.

The end of the mourning, 100 days later, is marked by the lanu kilikili (washing of the stones), when black volcanic stones, collected from islands like Tofua, are rubbed with sweet smelling oil and laid out over the grave. (This was originally done inside the grave to replace the by then rotten away skin of the deceased.) This ends the task of the undertaker.
