= Tupenu =

Tongan term for wrapped garment

Children dressed in their best for a church festival. The boys are wearing tupenu and ta'ovala.

Tupenu is the Tongan term for a wrapped garment also called a sarong, lungi, or lava-lava, worn through much of South Asia, Southeast Asia, Arabian Peninsula, the Horn of Africa and Oceania. It is analogous to the kilt worn in Scotland.

The tupenu worn by women is wide enough to cover the body between the waist and ankles, and long enough to wrap securely around the waist. The standard width of cloth yardage (45 inches) is generally wide enough, so a tupenu can be made in a matter of minutes by cutting and wrapping cloth from the bolt. Women wear a knee-length dress, or kofu, over the tupenu. On dress occasions, women wear matching kofu and tupenu, sewn from the same yardage. Fancy tupenus are often slightly tailored, with darts sewn into the top, so that they will fit the body more closely. On ceremonial occasions, women wear a ta'ovala, or finely woven pandanus mat, over the kofu and tupenu. The kiekie, a kind of grass or string skirt, is an acceptable, comfortable alternative to the ta'ovala on most occasions.

Women dressed for a funeral, cooking for the mourners

The tupenu worn by men is wide enough to cover the body between the waist and knees, and long enough to wrap securely around the waist. For work and casual wear, any piece of cloth will do. On dress occasions, men will wear tailored tupenu like Western wrap skirts made from suit material. These tupenu coordinate with Western suit-jackets. Usually, the formal tupenu will be covered with a ta'ovala worn as a sign of respect. The man's ta'ovala is analogous to the Western necktie.
