= Lavalava =

Rectangular clothing traditionally worn by Oceanic peoples

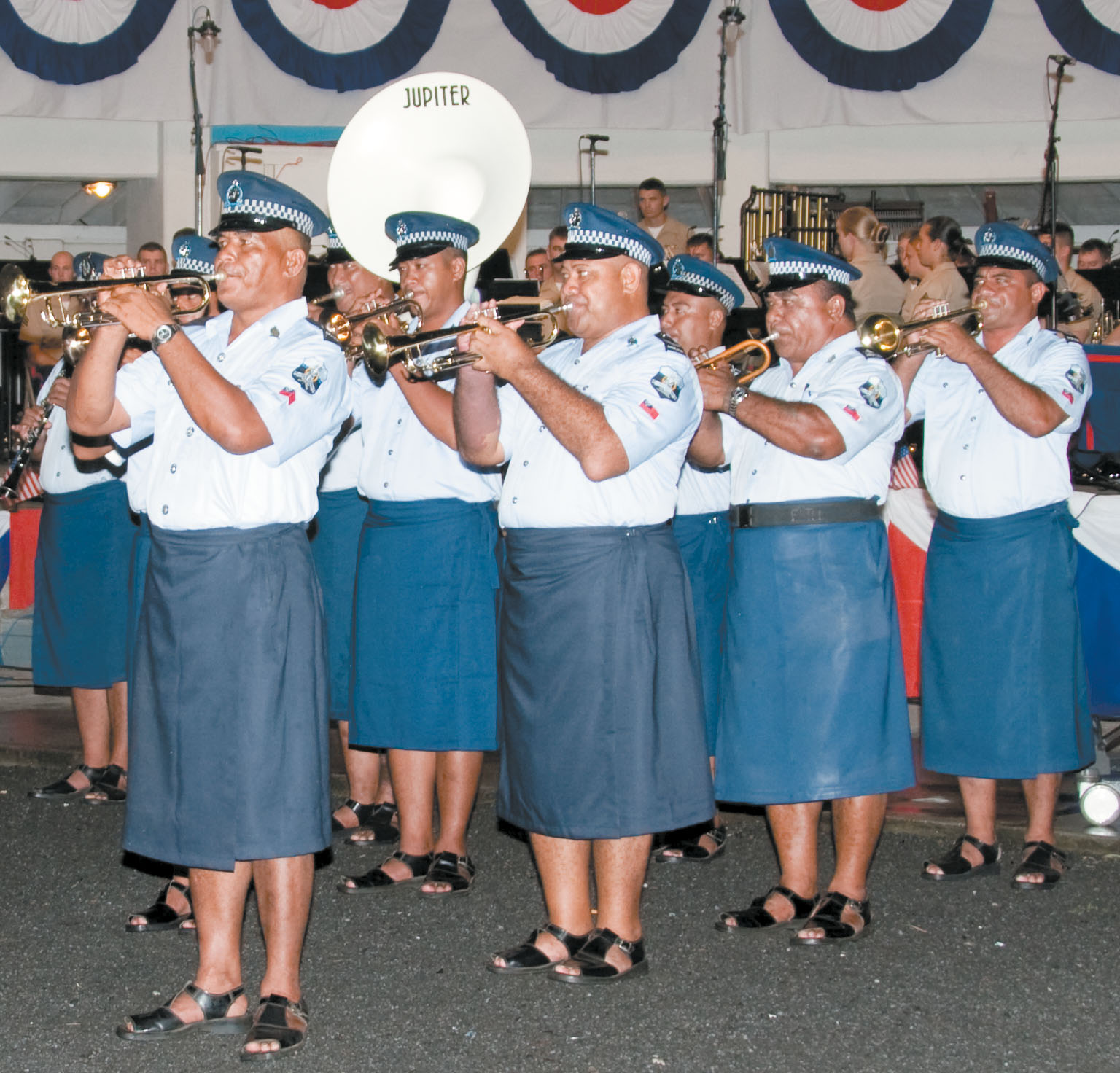
The Royal Samoan Police Band members wearing ‘ie faitaga

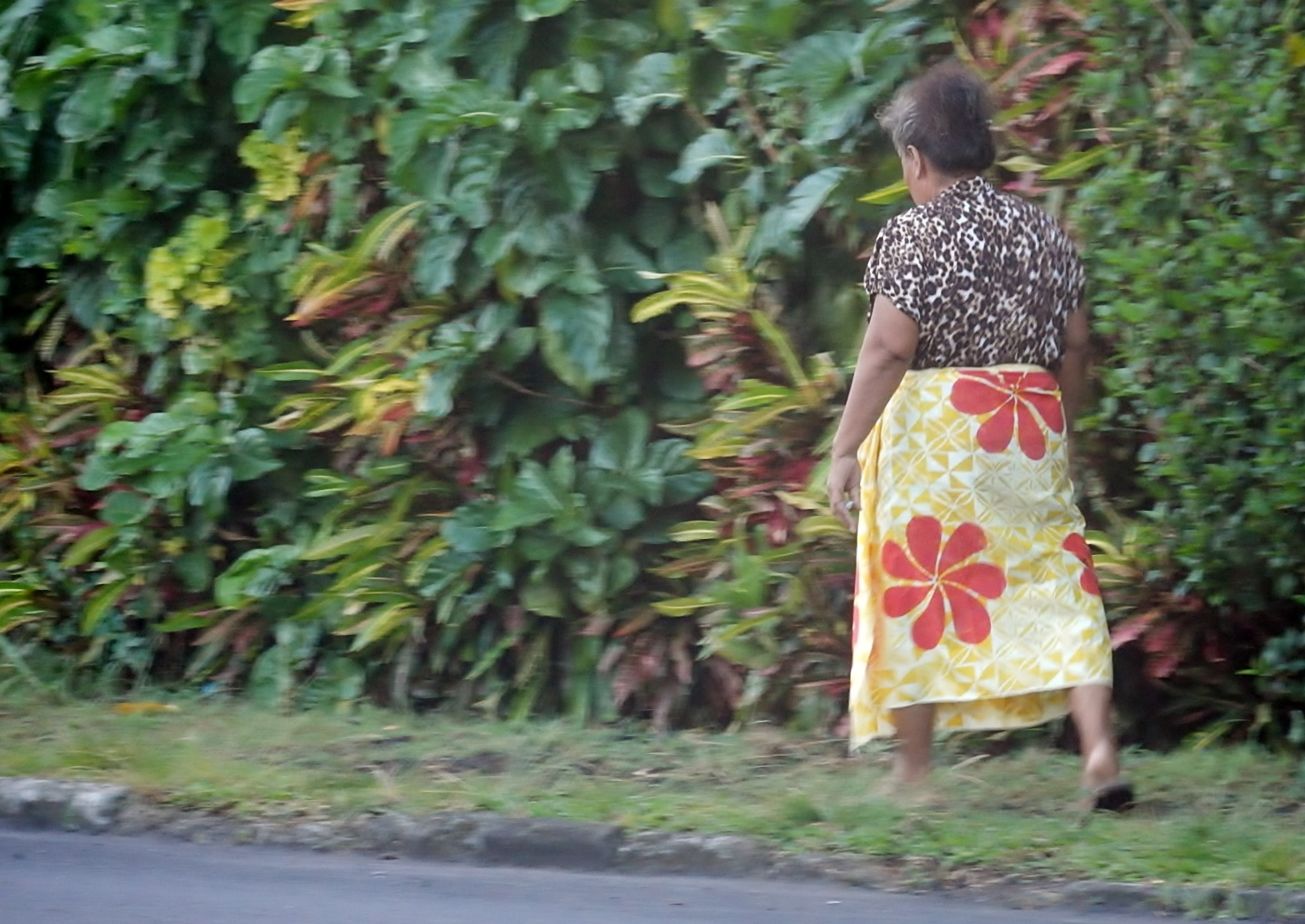
A Samoan woman wearing a lavalava in Apia.

A lavalava, sometimes written as lava-lava, also known as an 'ie, short for 'ie lavalava, is an article of daily clothing traditionally worn by Polynesians and other Oceanic peoples. It consists of a single rectangular cloth worn similarly to a wraparound skirt or kilt. The term lavalava is both singular and plural in the Samoan language.

== Customary use ==
Today the fashion remains common in Samoa, American Samoa, Tonga and parts of Melanesia and Micronesia. It is worn by men and women in uses from school uniforms to business attire with a suit jacket and tie. Many people of Oceanic ethnicity wear the lavalava as an expression of cultural identity and for comfort within expatriate communities, especially in the United States (notably Hawaii, Alaska, California, Washington, and Utah), Australia and New Zealand.

== Attire ==
The lavalava is secured around the waist by an overhand knotting of the upper corners of the cloth; women often tuck the loose ends into the waistband, while men usually allow them to hang in front. Women generally wear ankle-length lavalava while men's wraps often extend to the knee or mid-calf depending on the activity or occasion.

== History ==
Prior to the arrival of Europeans in the Pacific Ocean, the most prestigious lavalava were made by wrapping the body in a 'ie toga with fine mats (finely woven textiles of pandanus leaves) or siapo (tapa cloth) pounded from paper mulberry or wild hibiscus bark. The Samoans also created lavalava from traditional materials such as flower petals, leaves, feathers and seashells tied to a wrap-around backing of plaited plant fibers.

Calico and loomed cotton cloth had largely replaced woven or barkcloth lavalava as articles of daily use (though 'ie toga and siapo wraps are still used today for ceremonial and festive occasions and dance performances). Samoan men who bear the pe'a body tattoo, as well as Samoan women who bear the malu leg tattoos often roll the waistband of the lavalava or tuck in the sides and rear portion(s) of the lavalava to expose their tattoo during dance performances or ceremonial functions (such as 'ava ceremonies), a style referred to as agini.

Within Micronesia, the introduced term “lavalava” is used to describe loom-woven skirts in the Outer Islands of Yap, though weaving and wearing of these textiles once extended further east into present-day Chuuk State. Worn around a woman's hips, the fringed ends "meet together at the front and are then wrapped to one side and secured by a belt." Among these Western Caroline Islanders, traditional loom weaving has been described as “highly developed” and weavers have long demonstrated “singular ingenuity and resourcefulness” in their work. The skirts’ cultural significance “far exceeds their function simply as items of daily wear.” The lava-lava is nothing less than a “highly condensed visual expression of social and economic relations, ritual affairs, and the aesthetic ideals of Micronesian society.” In addition to being worn daily by all females who have reached womanhood in the atolls of the Western Caroline Island, the skirts are also used for investiture, initiation and the burial of local leaders. While back-strap tension weaving of skirts remains a common practice in the Outer Islands of Yap in Micronesia, among migrants the practice is diminishing.

== Current forms ==
Specially tailored linen lavalava which extend mid-calf, often with pockets and ties / buckles, are worn by men at special occasions or to church; these are always solid colors (in contrast to the bright patterns of everyday lava-lava) and are known as sulu (Fijian), 'ie faitaga (Samoan), or tupenu (Tongan). Similar ankle-length skirts form the lower half of the two-piece formal dress worn by Samoan and Tongan women (called puletasi and puletaha, respectively). On special occasions the Tongan tupenu and puletaha are usually associated with a tapa cloth or waist-mat called ta'ovala and some Samoans still wear a tapa cloth vala sash in similar fashion (though the vala is generally restricted to ceremonial / festive regalia of orators or people acting / dressing as taupou maidens and manaia beaus). The formal, tailored linen lavalava styles of Tonga, Samoa, and Fiji originated with the Fijian noble Ratu Sir Lala Sukuna who introduced the buckled sulu to Fiji in 1920 following his military service and university education in Europe.

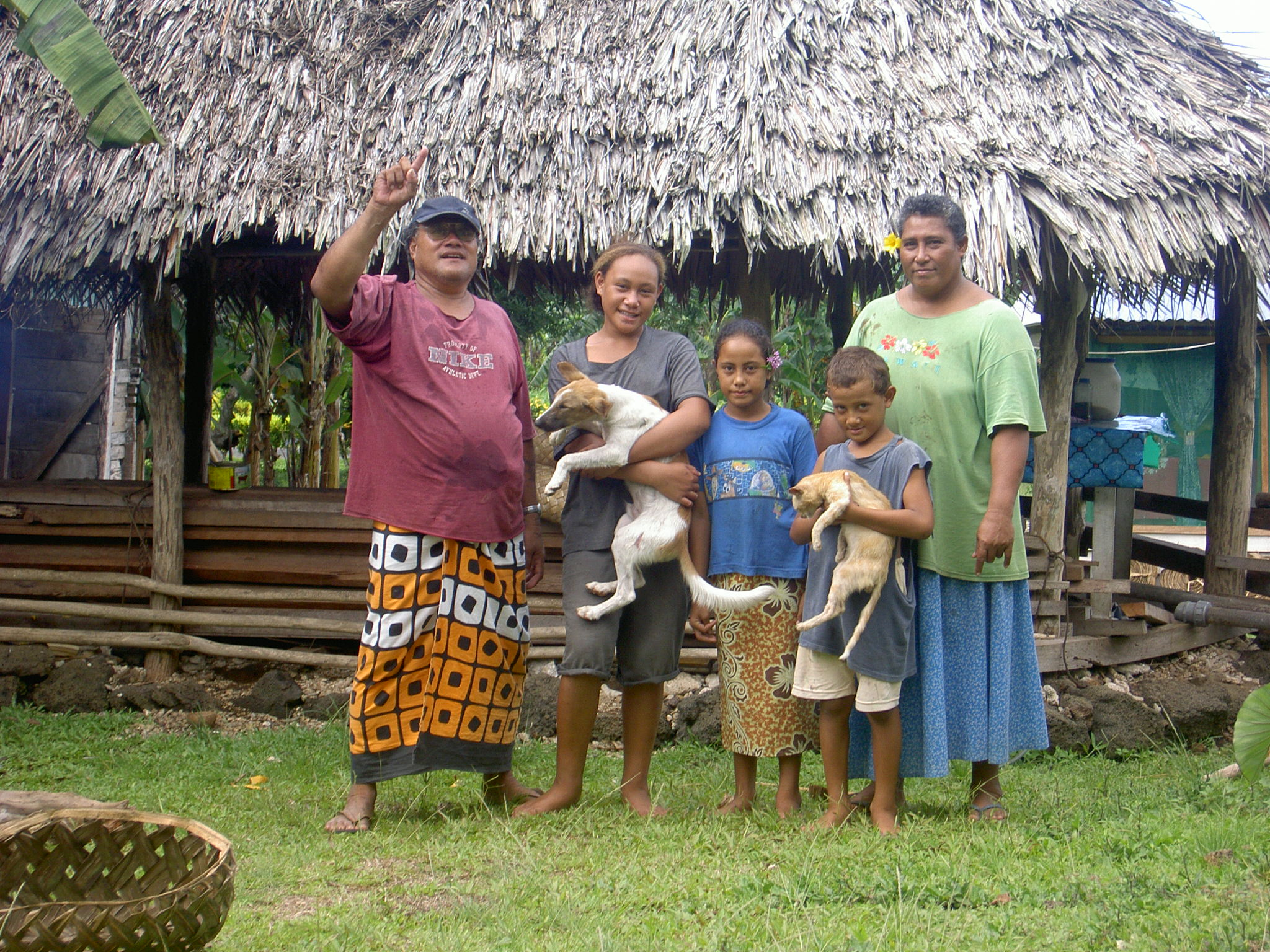
Samoan family wearing lavalava.

Loudly colored lavalava made from materials such as satin, velvet, polyester, and sequins have recently been popularized among performance dance groups and village, church, or school-based choirs.

The ʻie faitaga is included as part of Air New Zealand's future new staff uniform line-up designed by Emilia Wickstead and Te Rangitu Netana launching in 2025.

== Related names and garments ==
In English, such garments are generically called sarong, but that word is actually Malay, whereas lavalava is Samoan, being short for ʻie lavalava (cloth that wraps around). Another common name for the Polynesian variety is pāreu (usually spelled pareo), which is the Tahitian name. In Tonga, the garment is called tupenu. In New Caledonia and Wallis and Futuna, lavalava are called manou. A similar simple kind of clothing is the lap-lap worn in Papua New Guinea and the South Pacific, which is completely open at both sides.

== See also ==
- Fustanella
- Kilt
- Malong
- Sarong
