= Sarong =

Garment consisting of a length of fabric

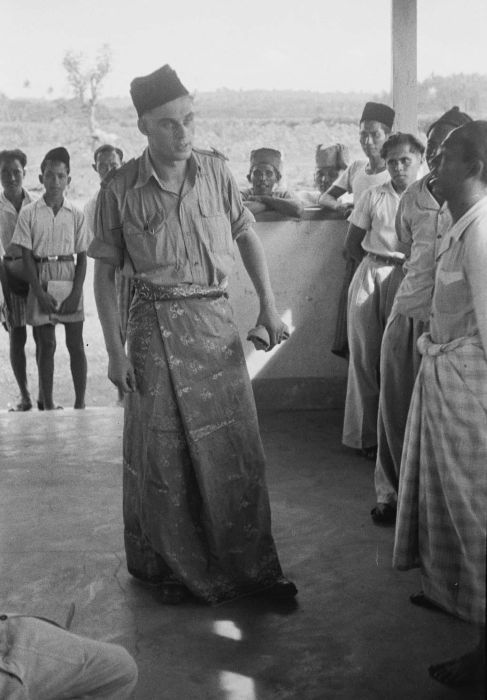
Dutch military personnel wearing sarong, 1949

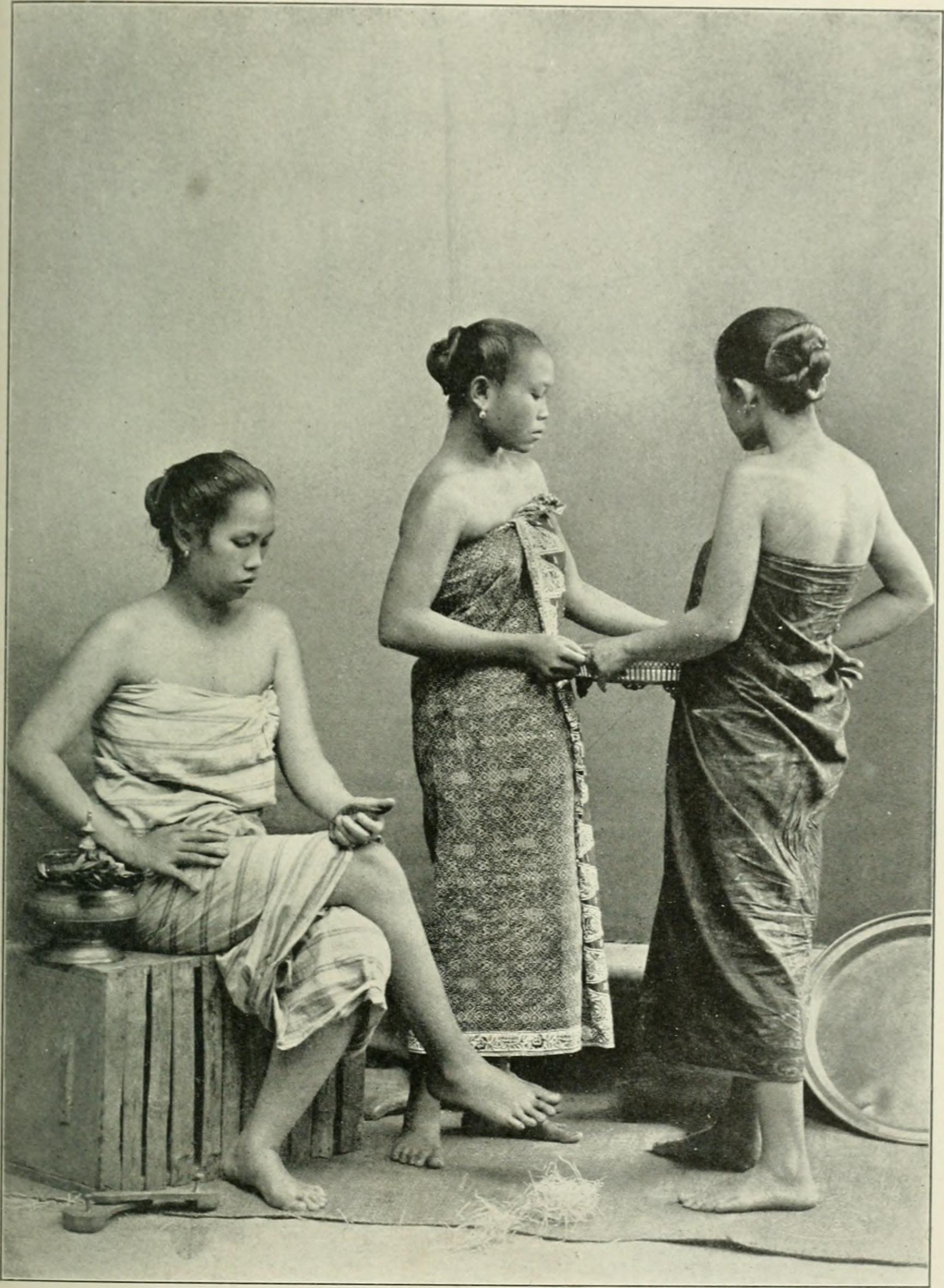
Three women wearing sarongs in 1905

A sarong or a sarung (Malay pronunciation: [saˈroŋ], /səˈrɒŋ/) is a large tube or length of fabric, often wrapped around the waist, worn in Southeast Asia, South Asia, West Asia, North Africa, East Africa, West Africa, and on many Pacific islands. The fabric may be brightly colored by means of batik or ikat dyeing. Many modern sarongs have printed designs, often depicting animals or plants. Different types of sarongs are worn in different places in the world, notably the lungi in the Indian subcontinent and the izaar in the Arabian Peninsula.

The unisex sarong is typically longer than the men's lungi.

== Etymology ==
The term sarong is a loanword from Malay sarong (Jawi: ساروڠ, old spelling: سارڠ), meaning 'to cover' or 'to sheath'. It was first used in 1834 referring to the skirt-like garment of the Malays. Sarong is the older Malay spelling, still used colloquially and persists in English, while sarung ([ˈsaruŋ]) is the standardised form of the word.

Variants of the term are found across Asia, such as Tamil saram (சாரம்), Arabic ṣārūn (صارون); and Sinhala sarama (සරම).

In West Africa, the word srong or sorong is found in the Akan language, and this word means 'the highest point', in reference to the garment being fastened at the very top in order to secure it.

== Overview ==
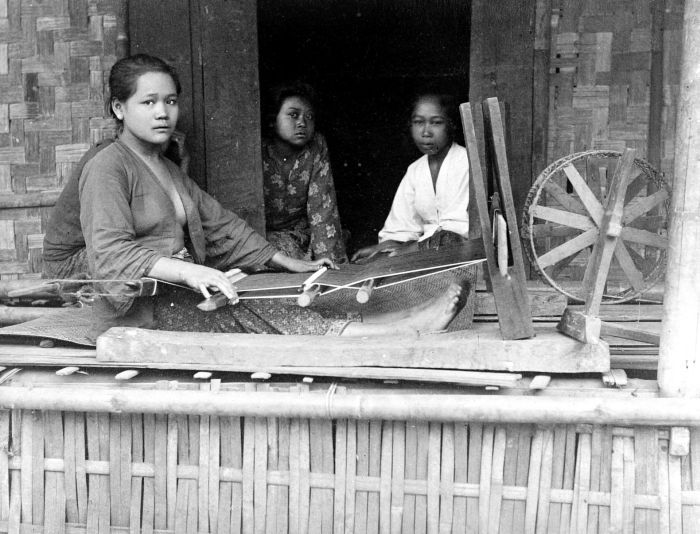
Sundanese sarong weaver in Bandung, West Java, present-day Indonesia, 1900–1940

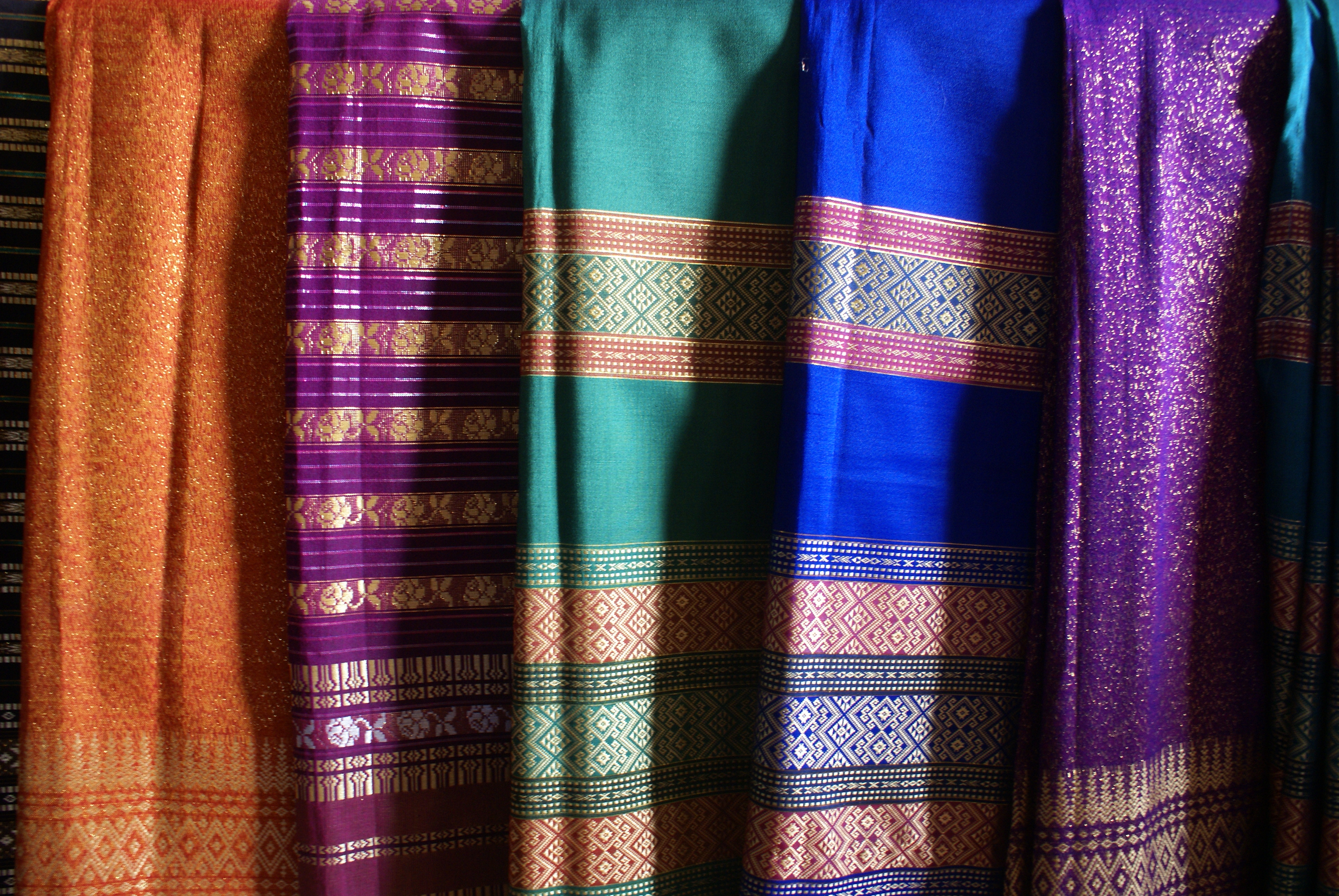
Sarung denotes a length of fabric as a garment.

Sarong or sarung denotes the lower garment worn by Southeast Asian men and women. This consists of a length of fabric about one yard (0.91 m) wide and two and a half yards (2.3 m) long. In the center of this sheet, across the narrower width, a panel of contrasting color or pattern about one foot wide is woven or dyed into the fabric, which is known as the kepala or 'head' of the sarong. This sheet is stitched at the narrower edges to form a tube. One steps into this tube, brings the upper edge above the level of the navel (the hem should be level with the ankles), positions the kepala at the center of the back, and folds in the excess fabric from both sides to the front center, where they overlap and secure the sarong by rolling the upper hem down over itself. Malay men wear sarongs woven in a check pattern, while women wear sarongs dyed in the batik method. However, in Javanese culture, the wearing of batik sarongs is common and not restricted to a particular gender; sometimes they are also worn on formal occasions such as weddings.

The sarong is common wear for women in formal settings with a kebaya blouse. Malay men wear sarongs in public only when attending Friday prayers at the mosque, but sarongs remain very common casual wear at home for men of all ethnicities and religions in Brunei, Indonesia, Philippines, Cambodia, Malaysia, Singapore, Sri Lanka, and much of the Indian subcontinent. (In the Indian subcontinent, excluding Sri Lanka, sarongs are sometimes known as mundu or lungi.)

== Regional variations ==
=== Arabian Peninsula ===
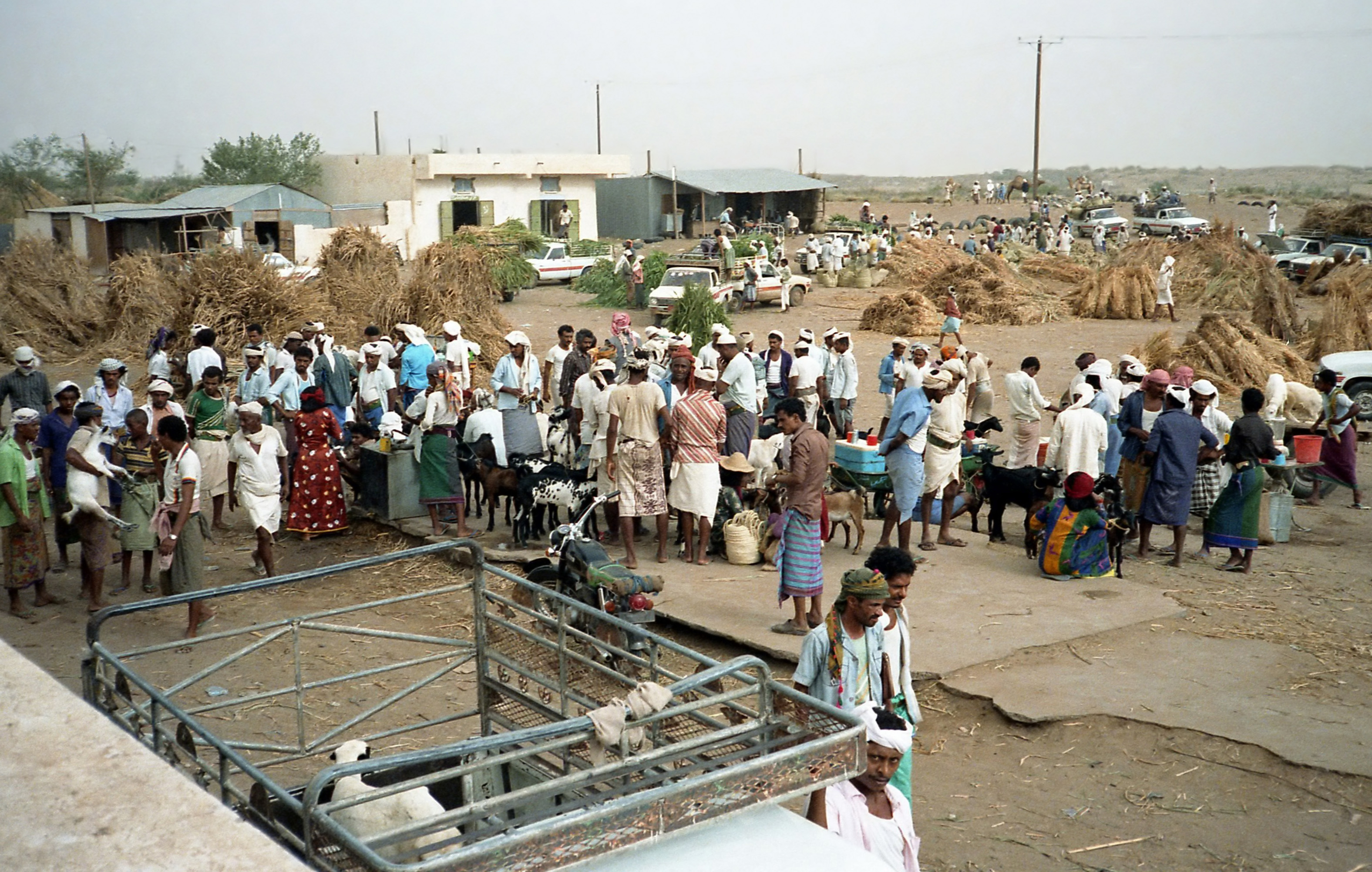
Yemeni men in traditional saroon

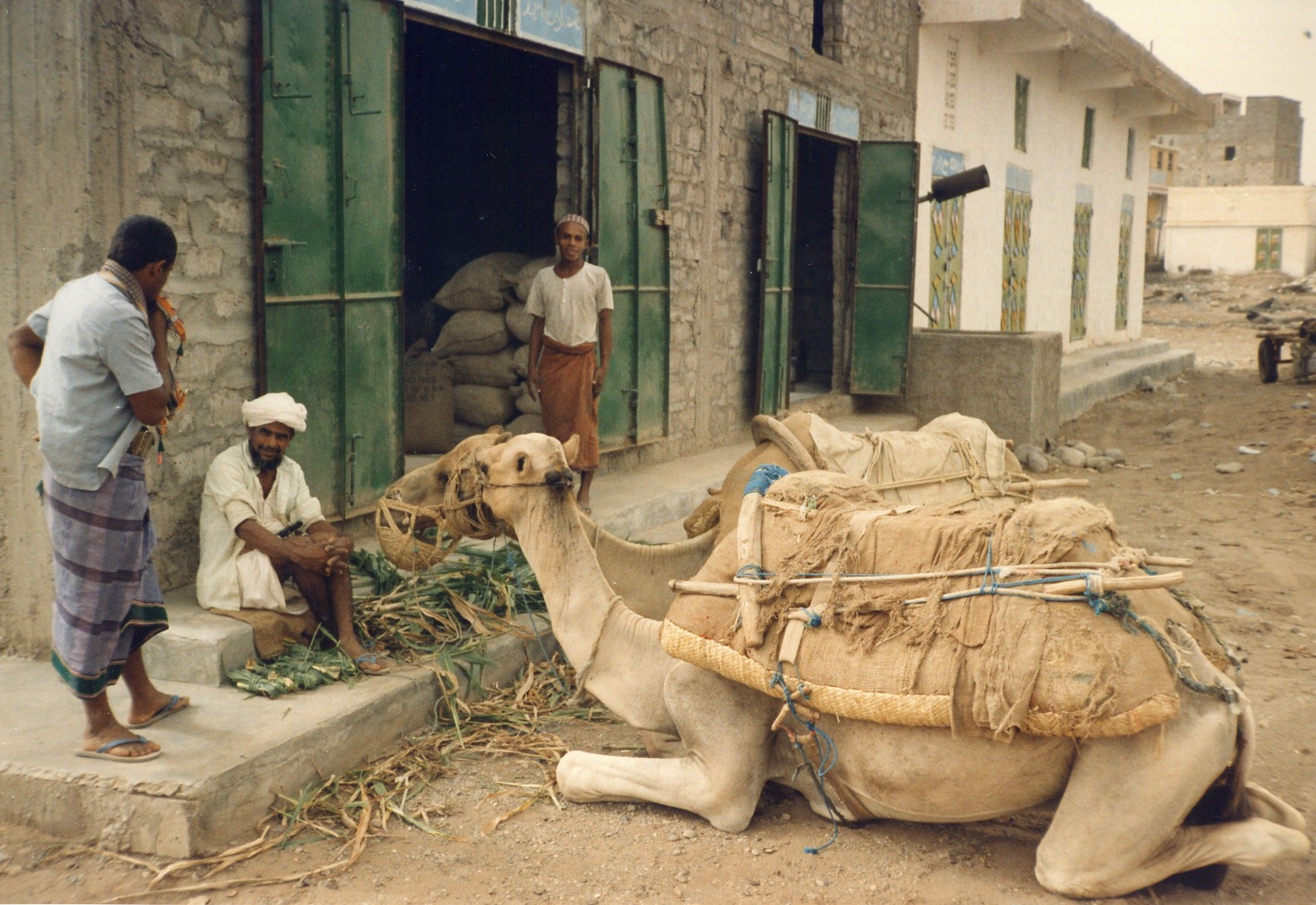
Yemeni man tying his saroon. Sometimes people keep money or small utensils in the folds of the futah.

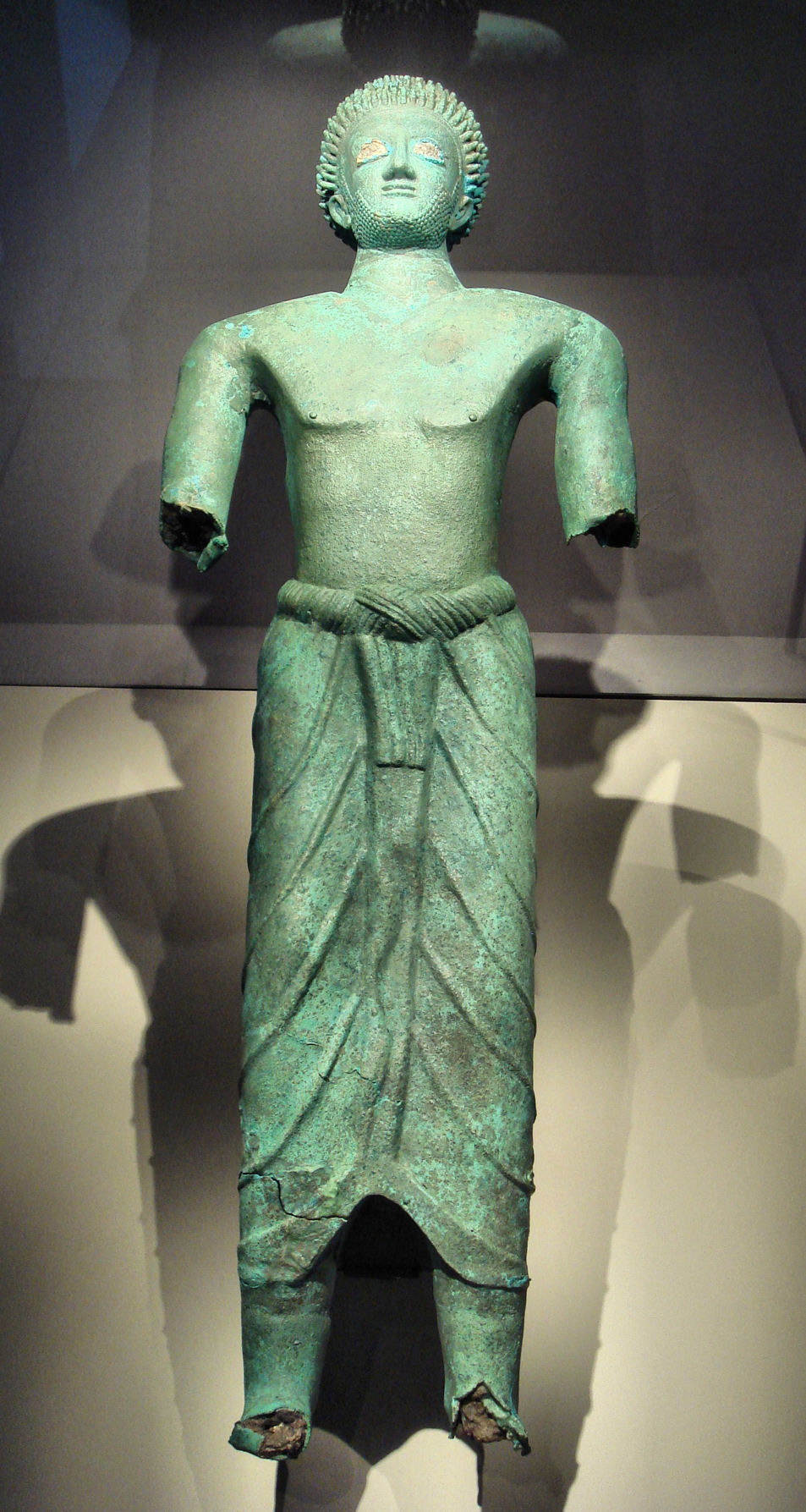
Bronze statue of a Yemeni man wearing a saroon

Sarongs known under a variety of local names are traditionally worn by the people of Yemen and elsewhere on the Arabian Peninsula. Local names for the garment include ṣārūn, fūṭah, izaar, wizār, maqtab and maʿwaz (pl. maʿāwiz). In Hadhramaut, Yemen, sarongs are called saroon (Arabic: صارون ṣārūn) in the interior and the coastal region. In Oman, sarongs are called wizār and are often white in color, similar to the Keralan mundu of the Indian subcontinent and it is usually worn under the Thawb. In Saudi Arabia, sarongs are known as izaar. Designs can be checkered or striped as well floral or arabesque, but double plaid (i.e., a vertical section of the izār with a different plaid pattern) designs from Indonesia are also very popular. In southwestern Saudi Arabia, tribal groups have their own style of unstitched izaar, which is locally woven. This is also worn in northern Yemen. However, the tribal groups in Yemen each have their own design for their ṣārūn, the latter of which may include tassels and fringes. It is thought that this tribal ṣārūn resembles the original izaar as worn on the Arabian Peninsula since pre-Islamic times such as the Shendyt. They are generally worn open and unstitched in such a way that the garment does not reach over one's ankles. Other izaars, often imported from Bangladesh, are the traditional clothing of Arab fishermen of the Persian Gulf, the Indian Ocean and the Red Sea. It was the traditional garment for men before the introduction of pant-like pajamas and kaftans during the Turkish and European colonial periods. Tube-stitched, as well as open sarongs, are both worn, even informal dishdasha-wearing countries, as casual sleepwear and at home.

=== Indian subcontinent ===
==== India ====
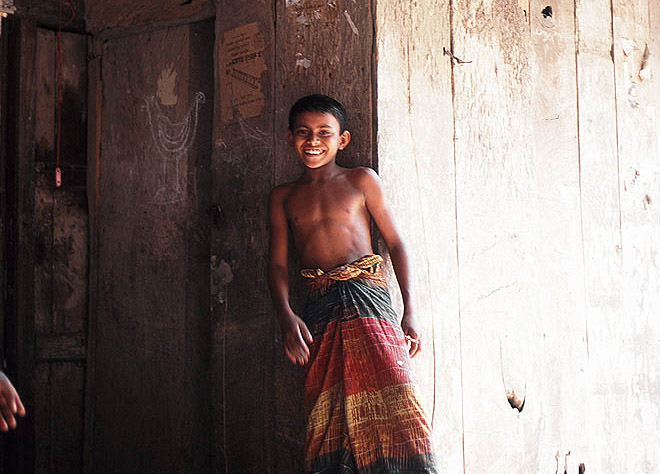
Bangladeshi boy in a traditional lungi

Attire similar to sarongs are found in many states in India. In the states of Manipur, where they are called phanek, and Assam, where they are called mekhela, they are very similar to those of South-East Asian nations. In the state of Kerala, they are called mundu if fully white or fully black, and lungi or kaili if coloured. In the state of Tamil Nadu, they are called kaili, saaram, veshti (vetti) or lungi, and are usually worn at home. A standard lungi measures 2.12 by 1.2 metres.

Both the terms mundu and lungi may be used interchangably with the word dhoti. However, while the dhoti is wrapped around the legs in the form of trousers, the mundu and lungi are not. The dhoti and the mundu are worn to formal, ceremonial or religious occasions.

==== Sri Lanka ====
Sarongs or 'sarung' are very common in Sri Lanka and worn only by men. (A similar garment is worn by women. However, the women's garment is called redda, which is a wrap-around skirt.) It is the standard garment for most men in rural and even some urban communities. However, most men of upper social classes (whose public attire is usually trousers) wear the sarong only for ceremonial purposes, as a convenient night garment or only within the confines of the house. The Tamil-speaking communities, the Sri Lankan Tamils and the Sri Lankan Moors people also call it saram or charam.

Statistically, the number of people wearing sarong as their primary public attire is on the decline in Sri Lanka, the reason being that the sarong carries the stigma of being the attire for less-educated lower social classes. However, there is a trend toward adopting the sarong as a fashionable garment or as a formal garment worn with national pride, only on special occasions. Political and social leaders of Sri Lanka who want to portray their humility and closeness to the common person and their nationalism, choose a variation of the sarong nicknamed the "national" as their public attire.

=== Horn of Africa ===
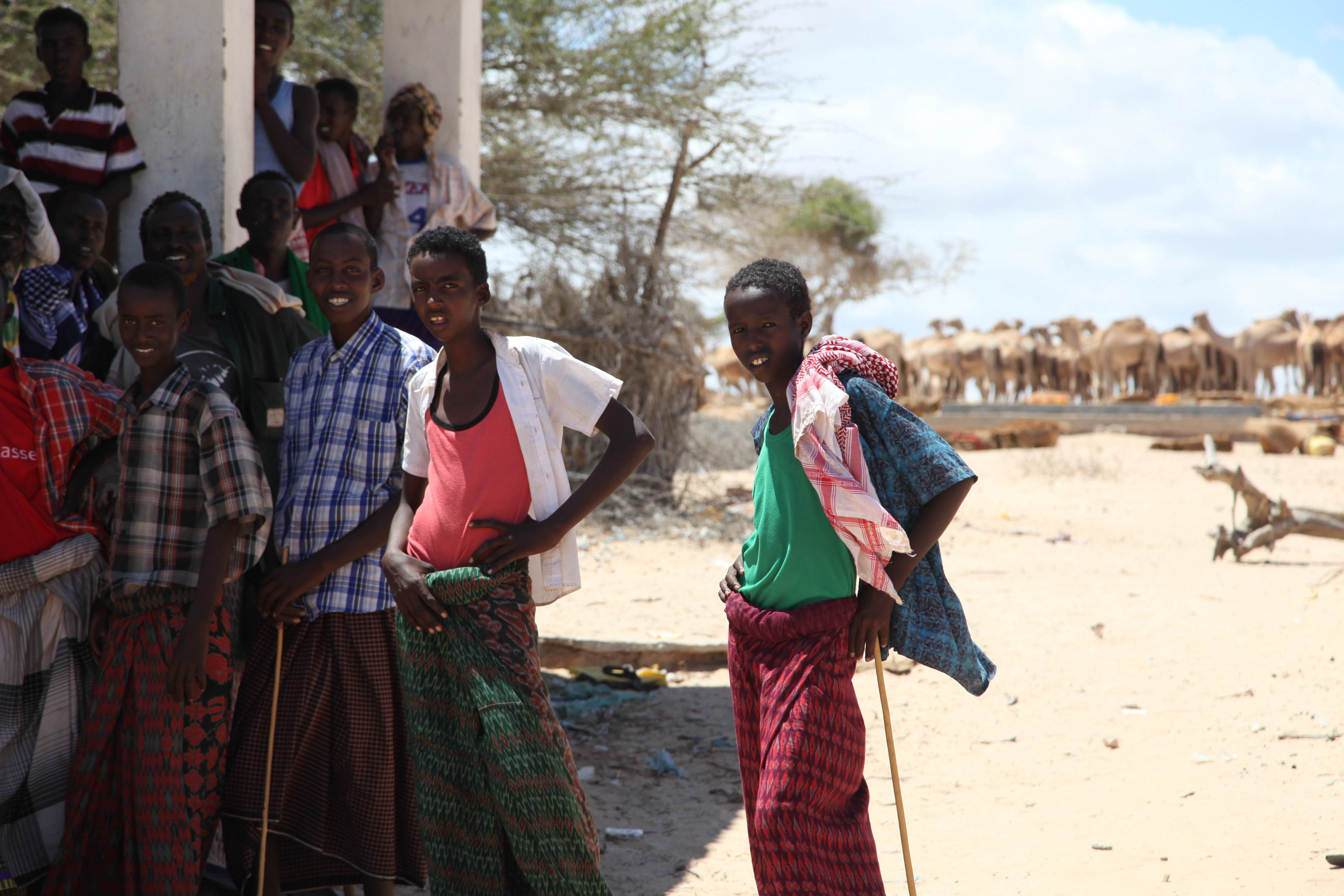
Somali men in traditional Sarong

Sarongs are ubiquitous in Somalia and the Muslim-inhabited areas of the Horn of Africa. Although nomadic and urban Somali men have worn them for centuries in the form of a plain white skirt, the colorful macawiis (ma'awiis) sarong, which is the most popular form of the garment in the region. Before the 1940s, most macawiis were made of cotton. However, since the industrialization of the market, they now come in many fabrics and combinations thereof, including polyester, nylon and silk.

Designs vary greatly and range from checkered square motifs with watermarked diamonds and plaid to simple geometric lines. The one constant is that they tend to be quite colorful; black macawiis are rare. Macawiis in Somalia are worn around the waist and folded several times over to secure their position. They are typically sold pre-sewn as one long circular stretch of cloth, though some vendors offer to sew them as a value-added service.

=== Southeast Asia ===
==== Indonesia ====
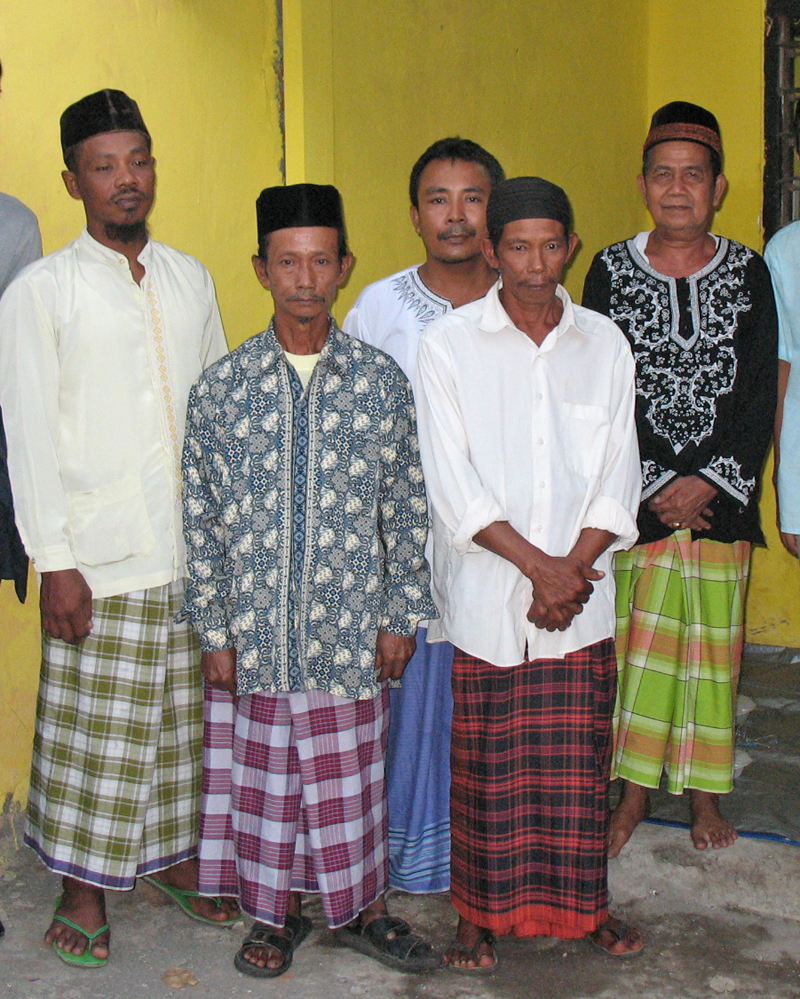
Javanese Muslim men in Indonesia wearing sarongs

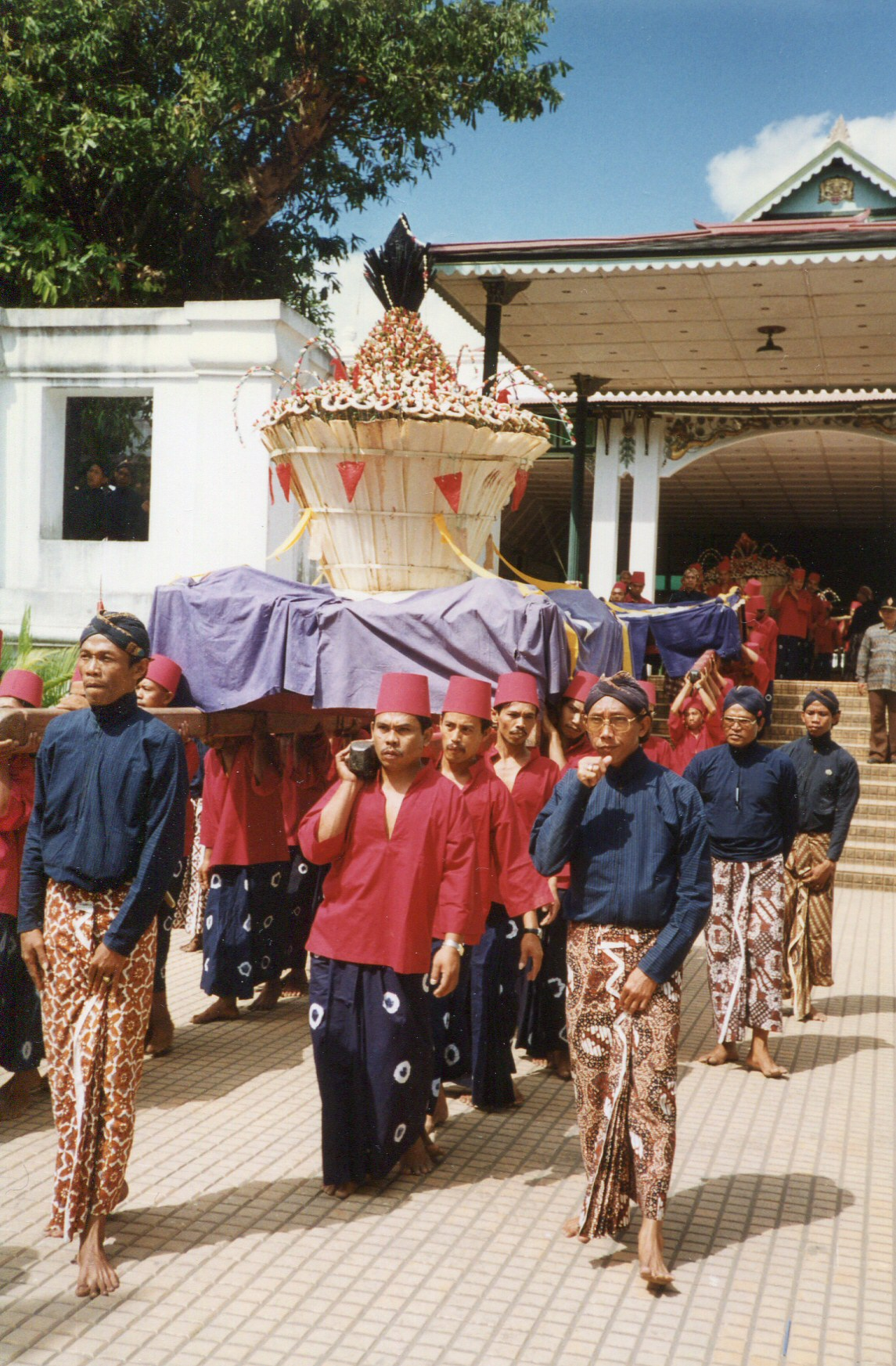
Formal batik sarongs worn by guards during Sultan's parade in Yogyakarta

In Indonesia the sarong is generally known as a kain sarung ('sarong cloth') except for in Bali where it carries the name kamben, possibly etymologically related to kemben (Javanese torso wrap). The sarung or sarong is often described as an Indonesian skirt; it is a large tube or length of fabric, often wrapped around the waist and worn by men and women throughout much of the Indonesian archipelago. The sarong is also commonly described as a unisex tubular skirt.

The most common design of the Indonesian sarong is woven cloth with checkered motifs, usually used by Muslim men for salah prayer. This kind of sarong cloth is stitched together to create a tubular skirt-like lower garment. In Bali, sarongs are not stitched together as a tube, but remain as a piece of cloth to wrap around the waist and secured with a knot.

Other than common checkered motifs, other woven or print methods might be employed, such as batik, ikat, songket, and other kinds of tenun traditional woven clothes. Sarongs are used by various ethnic groups in Indonesia. They are made from a variety of materials such as cotton, polyester or silk. Indonesian women wear traditional costumes called kebaya as upper garments, while for lower garments they wear sarongs dyed in the batik method, with flower motifs and in brighter colors. However, in Javanese culture, the wearing of batik sarungs is not restricted to women on formal occasions such as weddings.

In 2019, in an effort to promote and popularize the sarong among its people, the government encouraged Indonesians to wear the sarong in public at least once a month. President Joko Widodo said the sarong is a significant element of Indonesian culture and that wearing it will be a sign of appreciation for sarong craftsmen.

==== Malaysia ====
In Malaysia, the sarong is known as a kain. The word kain is paired with specific words to specify its type and function such as kain pelikat (a type of sarong with a simple stripe and box pattern), kain sarung, kain tenun (woven sarong), kain batik (sarong with batik motifs and design, normally worn by women and paired with a kebaya or Baju Kurung) or kain samping or sampin (specialized sarong worn by men with Baju Melayu). In the Malaysian state of Sarawak, it is called sabok (for men) and tapeh (for women).

Since 2017, special celebrations around Malaysia Day are held to encourage the wearing of sarong in public spaces as well as taking the railway system called the Keretapi Sarong ('Sarong Train').

==== Philippines ====
Similar sarong-like native garments from the Philippines are generally known as tapis in Luzon, alampay in the Cordilleran highlands, patadyong in the islands of Visayas and Sulu, and malong in Mindanao. They are worn by both men and women and can be rectangular or tube-like. They can be knee-length or ankle-length and come in various colors that are usually unique to the specific ethnic group that wove them. They can also serve as shawls or blankets. They were paired with close-fitting shirts or jackets known as baro or bayu.

Among the Maranao people, the malong is featured in the folk dance kapa malong malong which shows the various ways that the malong can be utilized.

During the Spanish colonial era, the tapis was worn over a longer skirt (saya or falda) due to the shortness of the tapis being deemed too immodest by the Spanish clergy to be worn alone. It evolved over time to become part of the traditional Filipino dress for women, the baro't saya.

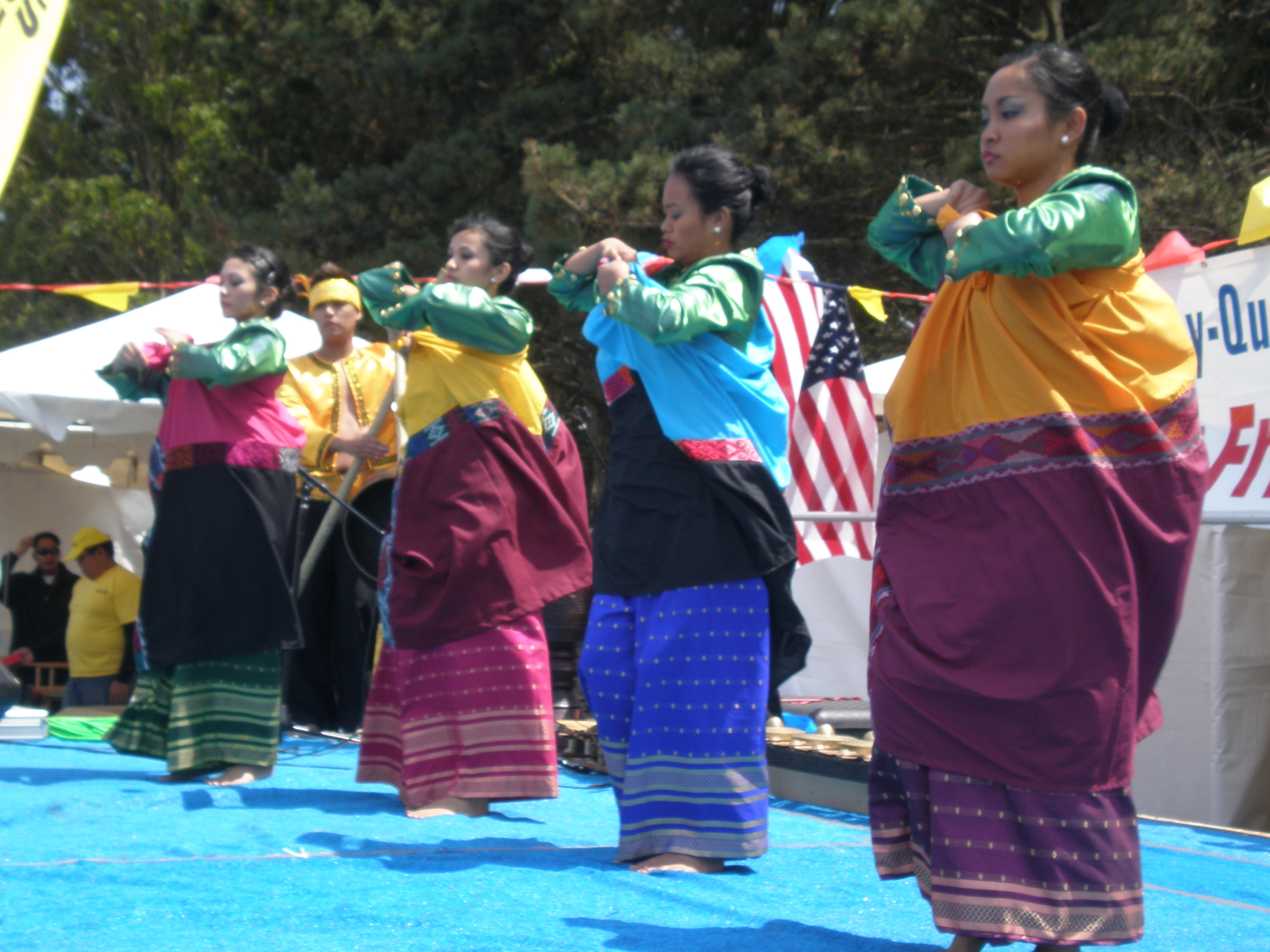
Kapa malong malong, a traditional Maranao dance featuring the many uses of the malong

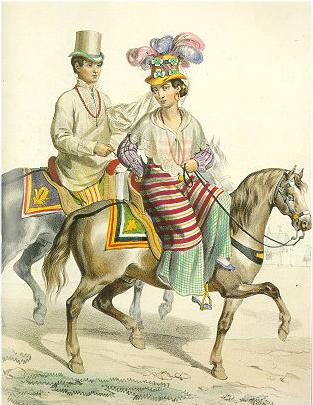
French illustration of a Spanish-Filipino mestizo couple c. 1846, showing the traditional way of wearing the tapis by women

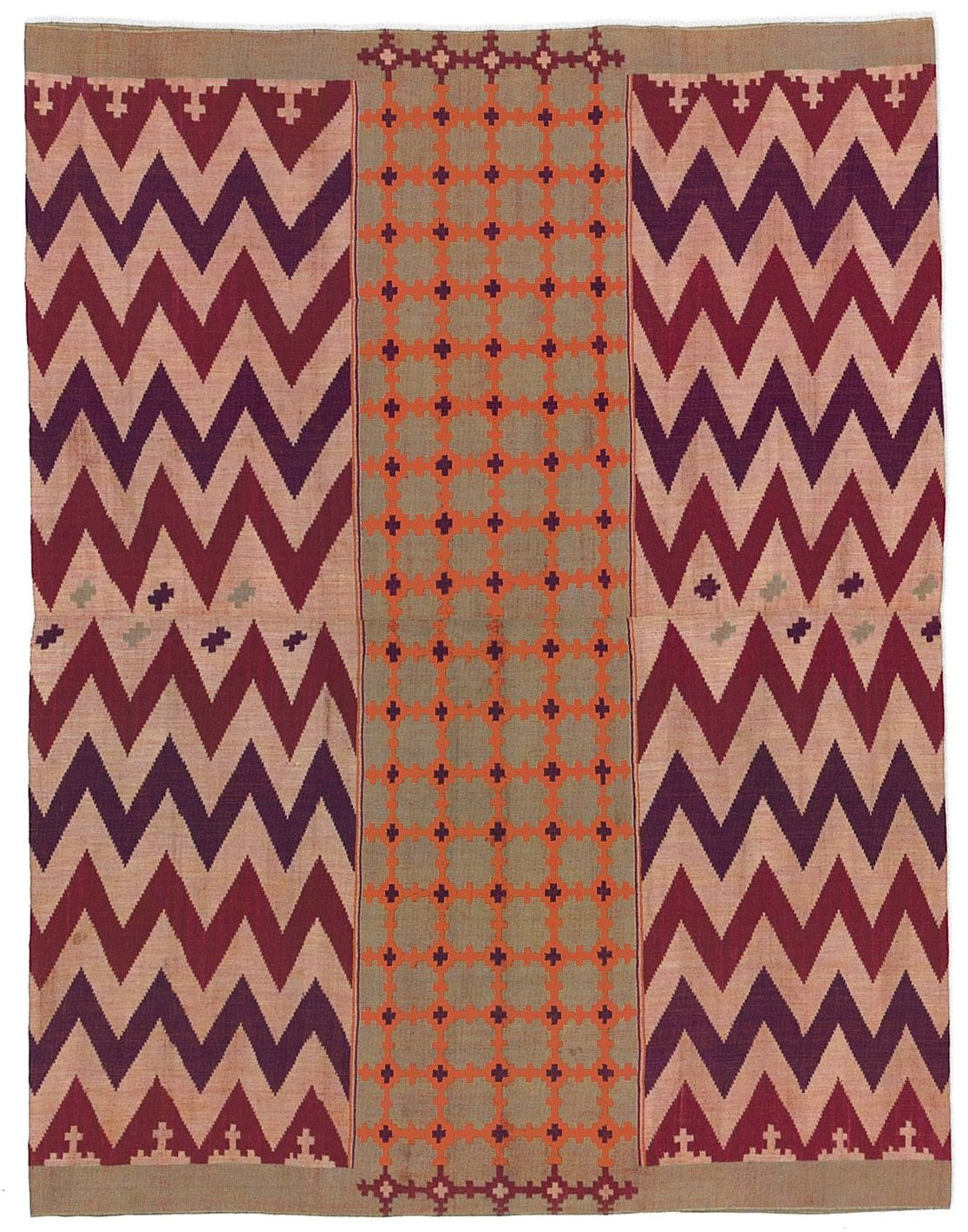
A patadyong from the Sulu Archipelago in the Honolulu Museum of Art

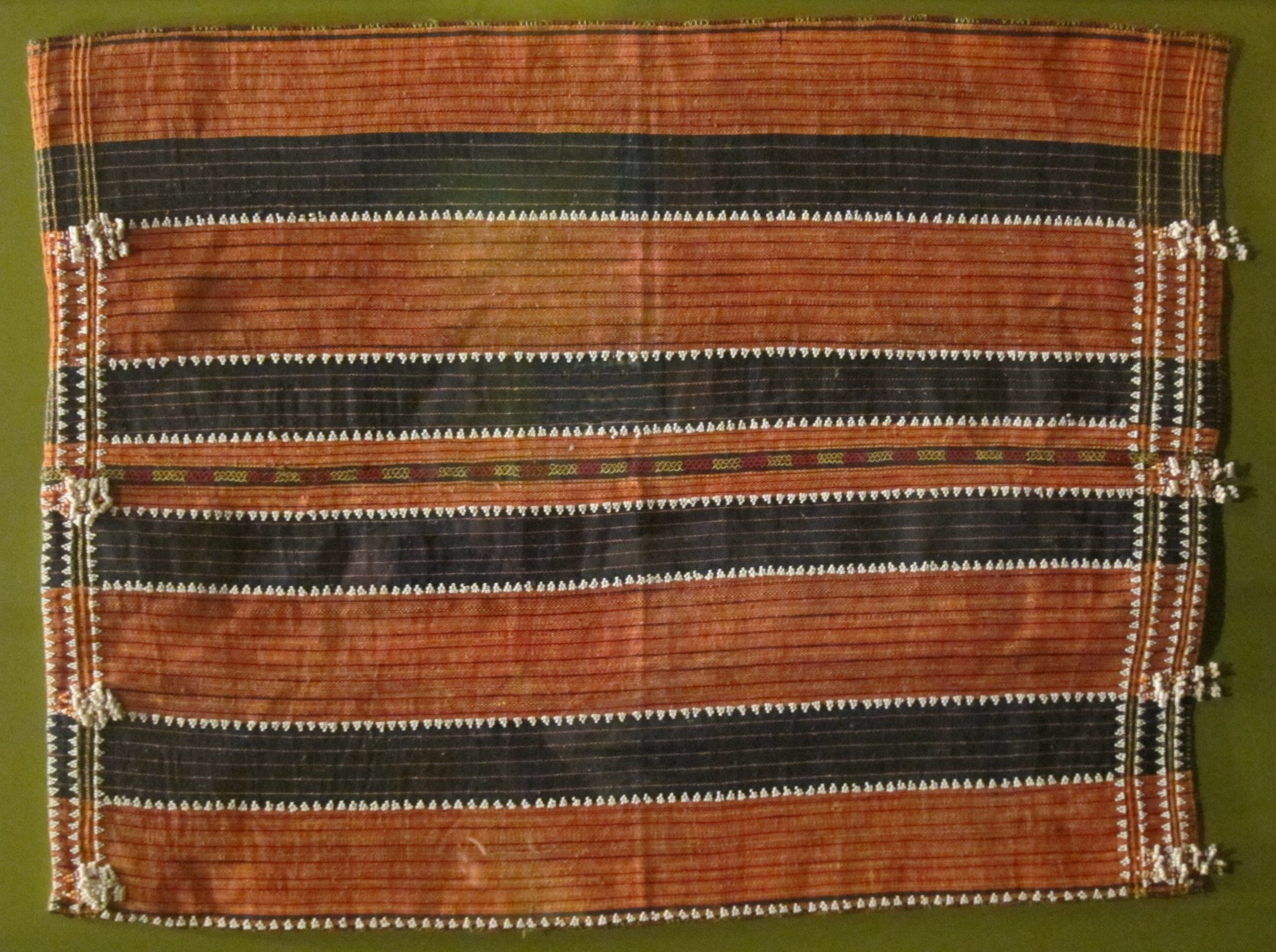
Cordilleran alampay in the Honolulu Museum of Art

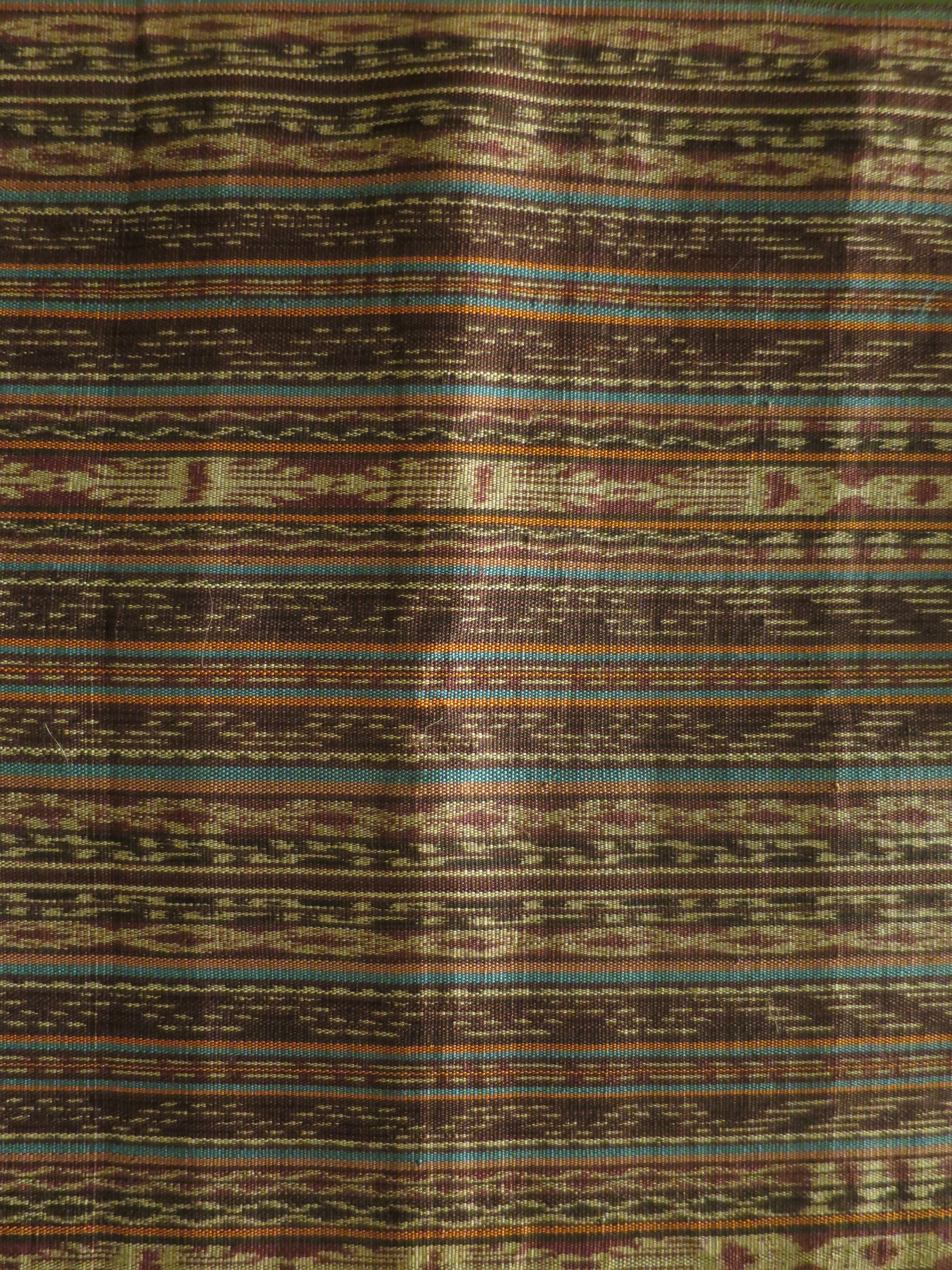
Bagobo malong woven from abaca fiber

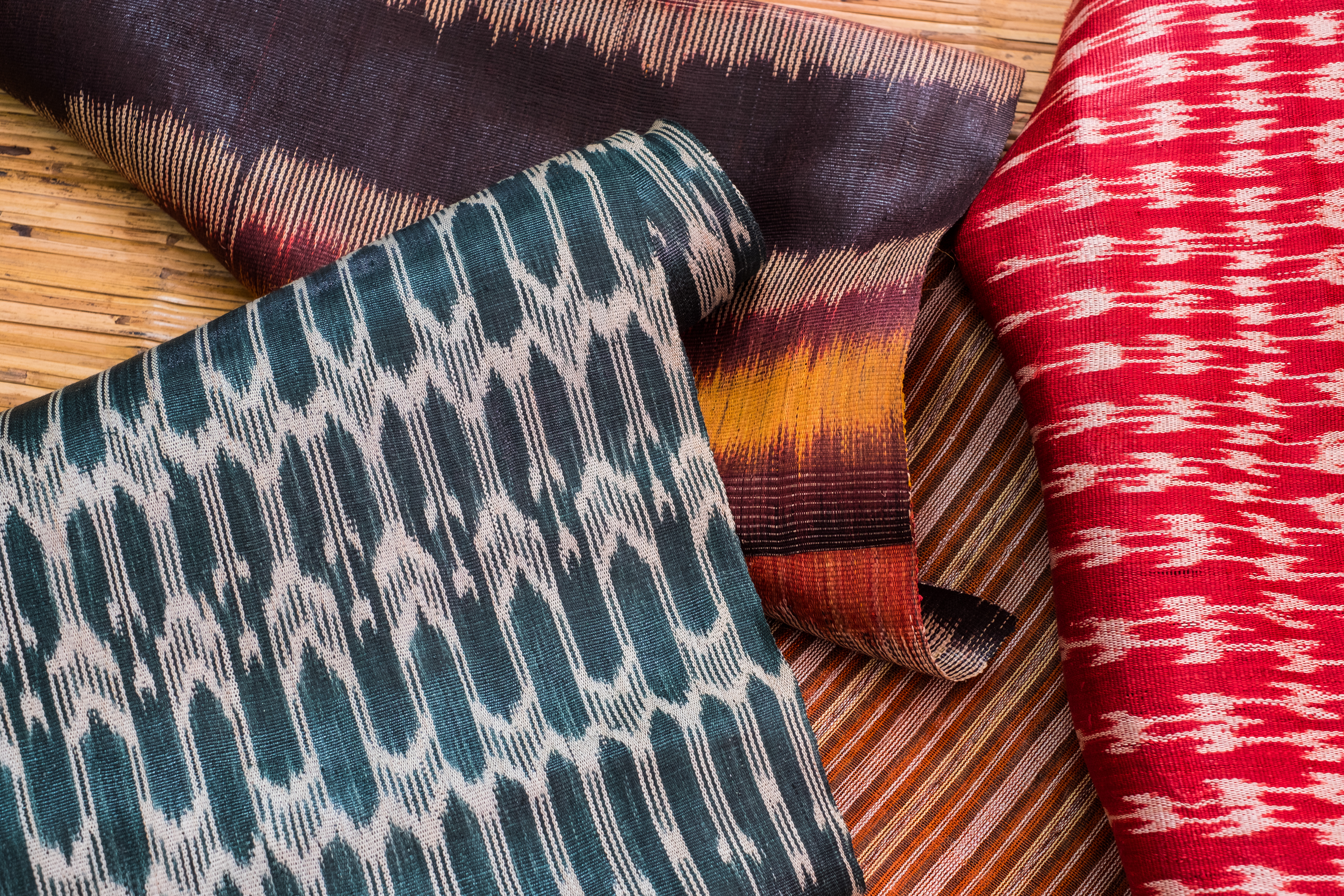
T'nalak textiles woven from abaca fiber

=== Western world ===
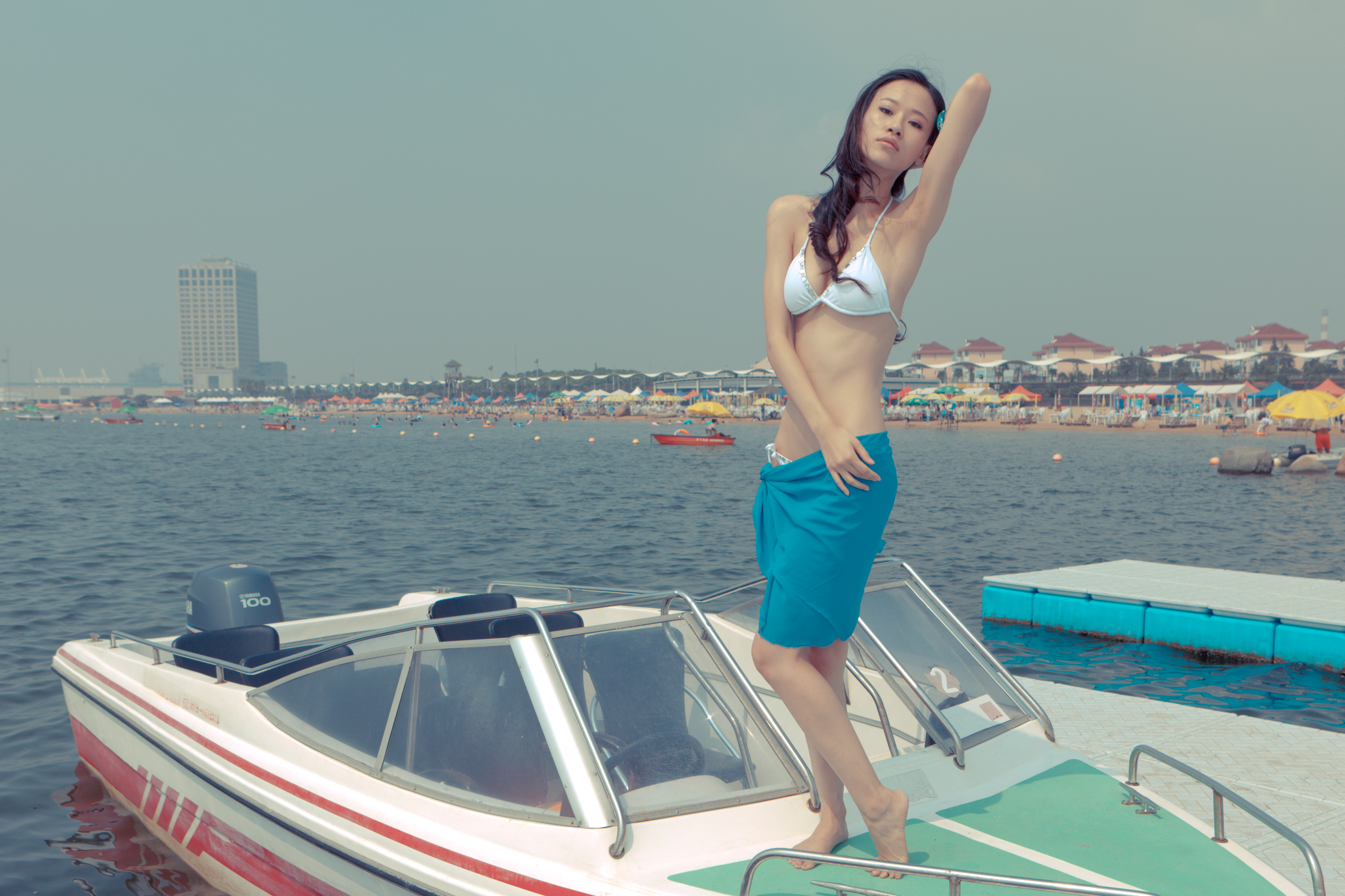
Woman wearing sarong over bikini at a beach

In North and South America as well as Europe, hip wraps are worn as beach wear or as a cover-up over swimwear. The wrap is often made of a thin, light fabric, often rayon, and may feature decorative fringing on both sides. They may have ties, which are long thin straps of fabric which the wearer can tie together to prevent the wrap from falling down. These wraps are mostly worn by women as beach cover-ups and do not usually resemble traditional Asian or African sarongs in size, pattern or design. Western men who wear male sarongs are influenced by the Scottish kilt or lavalava within the Polynesian or Samoan culture. Typically sarongs are worn by men when they are at home, the beach, by the pool, or on a cruise.

== Securing ==
Numerous tying methods exist to hold a sarong to the wearer's body. In some cases, these techniques customarily differ according to the sex of wearer. If a sarong has ties, they may be used to hold it in place. Sarong ties give the wearer a little extra hold and security. If no ties exist, a pin may be used, the fabric may be tightly tucked under itself in layers, the corners of the main sheet may be wrapped around the body and knotted, or a belt may be used to hold the sarong in place.

== Similar garments ==
The basic garment known in English most often as a sarong, sewn or unsewn, has analogs in many regions, where it shows variations in style and is known by different names.

- Africa
  - In Madagascar it is called a lamba.
  - In Malawi it is called a chitenje.
  - In Mauritius it is called a pareo.
  - In Mozambique it is called a capulana.
  - In Somalia and Djibouti it is called a macawiis or, less commonly, hoosgunti.
  - Along the Swahili Coast, it is called either a kanga (worn by African women), or a kikoy, traditionally worn by men and used with much simpler designs, however, it is used more frequently in high fashion. Kangas are brightly coloured lengths of cotton that incorporate elaborate and artistic designs and usually include the printing of a Swahili proverb along the hem.
  - In South Africa it is called a kikoi and commonly used as a furniture throw or for going to the beach.
  - In Zambia they are known as chitenge.
- Brazil
  - Kangas or cangas are used in Brazil as swimwear by women. They are readily available at beaches and littoral cities, but are also found in shops in the countryside for swimming in pools or rivers.
- Middle East
  - In Saudi Arabia, it is called futa (Arabic: فوطه).
  - In Yemen, it is called either futa (Arabic: فوطه) or mewaz (Arabic: معوز).
- Indian subcontinent
  - In South India it is called a lungi. It is most often sewn into a large cylindrical shape, so there is no slit when the phanek or lungi is tied.
  - In eastern India and Bangladesh it is known as a lungi.
  - In Northeastern India traditional clothing are the phanek in Manipur and mekhela in Assam which are very similar to the traditional attire of other South-East Asian nations.
  - In South India it is called veetti in Tamil, pancha in Telugu, panche in Kannada, and mundu in Malayalam.
  - In the southernmost districts of Tamil Nadu, it is also known as chaaram, possibly influenced from Sri Lanka from the trading days.
  - In the Maldives, and Indian state of Kerala, it is known as a mundu, feyli or neriyathu.
  - In Punjab it is a called chadra.
  - In Sri Lanka it is called saram in Tamil, and sarama in Sinhalese.
- Southeast Asia
  - In Cambodia សារុង /saaroŋ/ is used as an alternative to សំពត់ /sɑmpʊət/.
  - In Indonesia, it is generally known as sarung or kain sarung, but in larger extent in Indonesian languages it can be known as cawat, cindai, tapih, tapis, lunggi, lurik, pareo, palepai, jarit, jarik, sinjang, kampuh, poleng, sindai, selongsong, wiru, and wiron.
  - In Laos and Isan (northwestern Thailand), it is called a sinh (Lao: ສິ້ນ, Thai: ซิ่น, Tai Lü: ᦉᦲᧃᧉ), as well as sarong.
  - In Malaysia it is known as a kain, kain pelikat, kain sarung, kain tenun, kain batik, or kain sampin (specialised sarong worn by men with Baju Melayu). In the Malaysian state of Sarawak, it is called sabok (for men) and tapeh (for women).
  - In Myanmar, it is known as a longyi.
  - In the Philippines it is generally known as malong (in Mindanao), patadyong (in Visayas and the Sulu Archipelago), and tapis (in Luzon). It can function as a skirt for both men and women, a turban, niqab, hijab, a dress, a blanket, a sunshade, a bedsheet, a "dressing room", a hammock, a prayer mat, and other purposes. During the Spanish colonial period, it evolved into a distinctive outer covering of the skirt for the baro't saya.
  - In Thailand, it is known as a pha khao ma (Thai: ผ้าขาวม้า) for men and a pha thung (Thai: ผ้าถุง) for women.
- Pacific Islands
  - In New Zealand, Māori know it as a Rāpaki
  - In Fiji it is known as an isulu.
  - In Hawaii it is referred to as kikepa.
  - In Papua New Guinea the Tok Pisin term is lap-lap and it is worn by men and women. In the other lingua franca, Hiri Motu, it is called rami.
  - In Rotuma, it is known as a hạ' fạli.
  - In Samoa it is known as a lavalava (also lava-lava).
  - In Tahiti and Cook Islands it is known as a pāreu.
  - In Tonga it is known as tupenu.
  - In Wallis and Futuna it is known as kie.
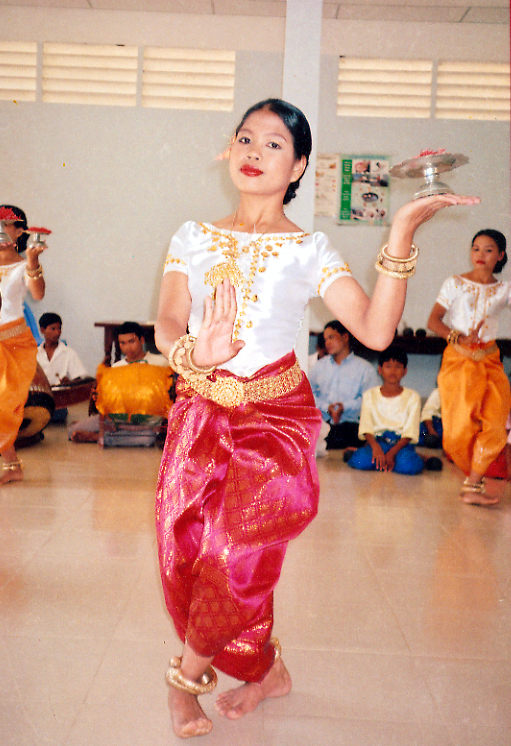
A traditional Khmer dancer wearing a sampot in Cambodia

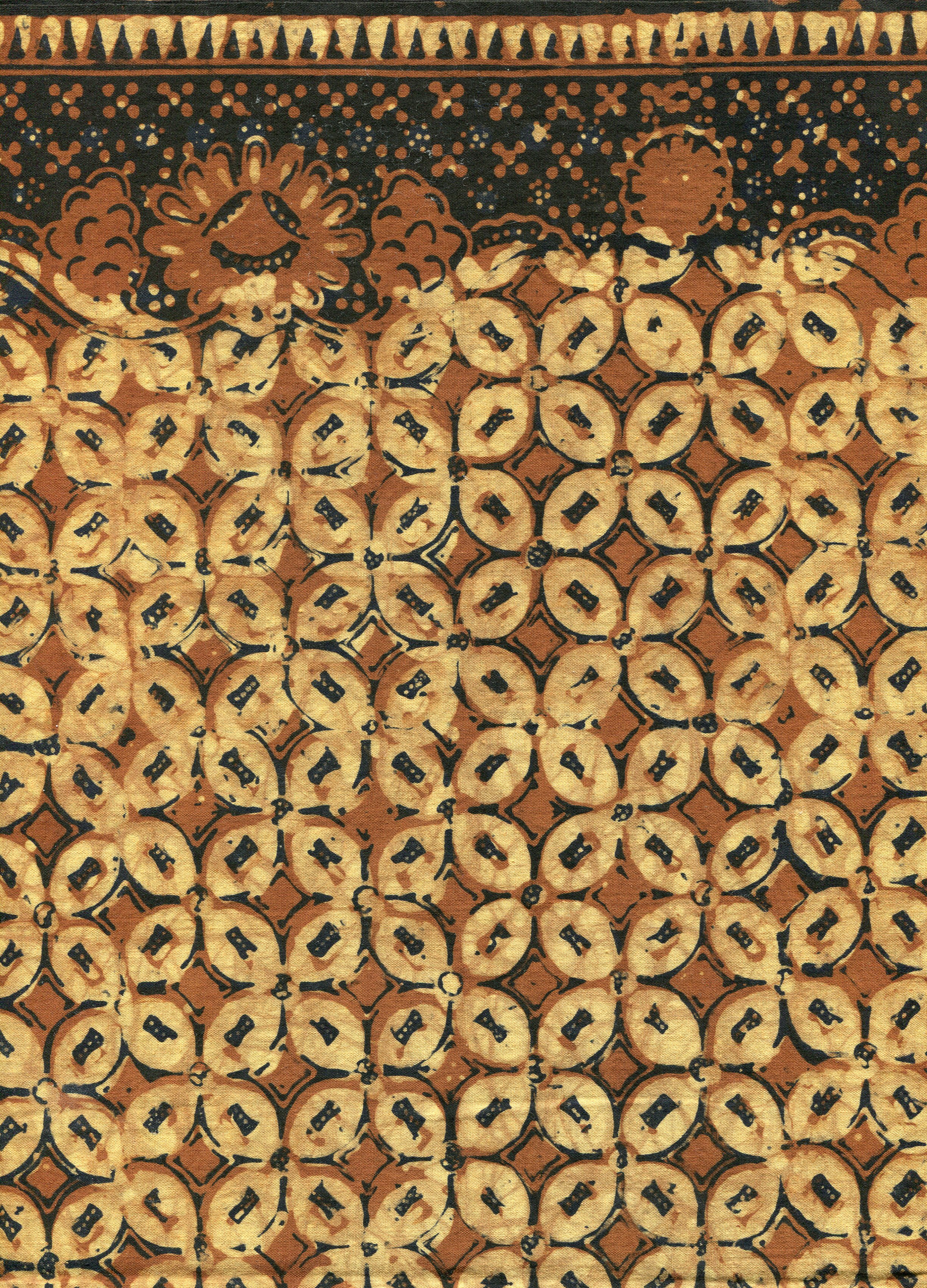
The batik sarong in "Kawung" pattern, Java, Indonesia

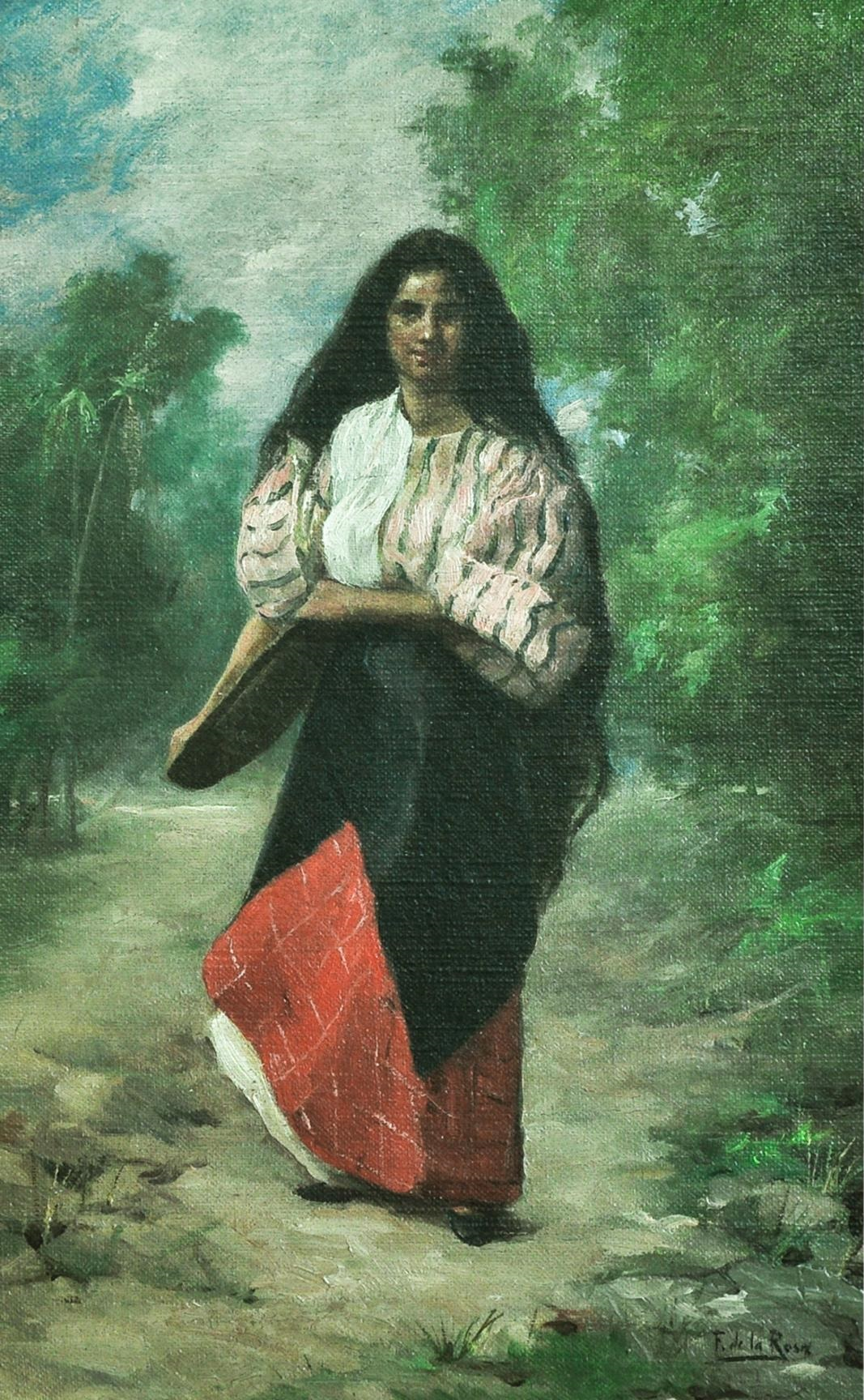
The tapis of the traditional colonial Filipino baro't saya dress, evolved from a sarong-like wrap with the addition of a long skirt (saya) underneath, due to Spanish demands for modesty

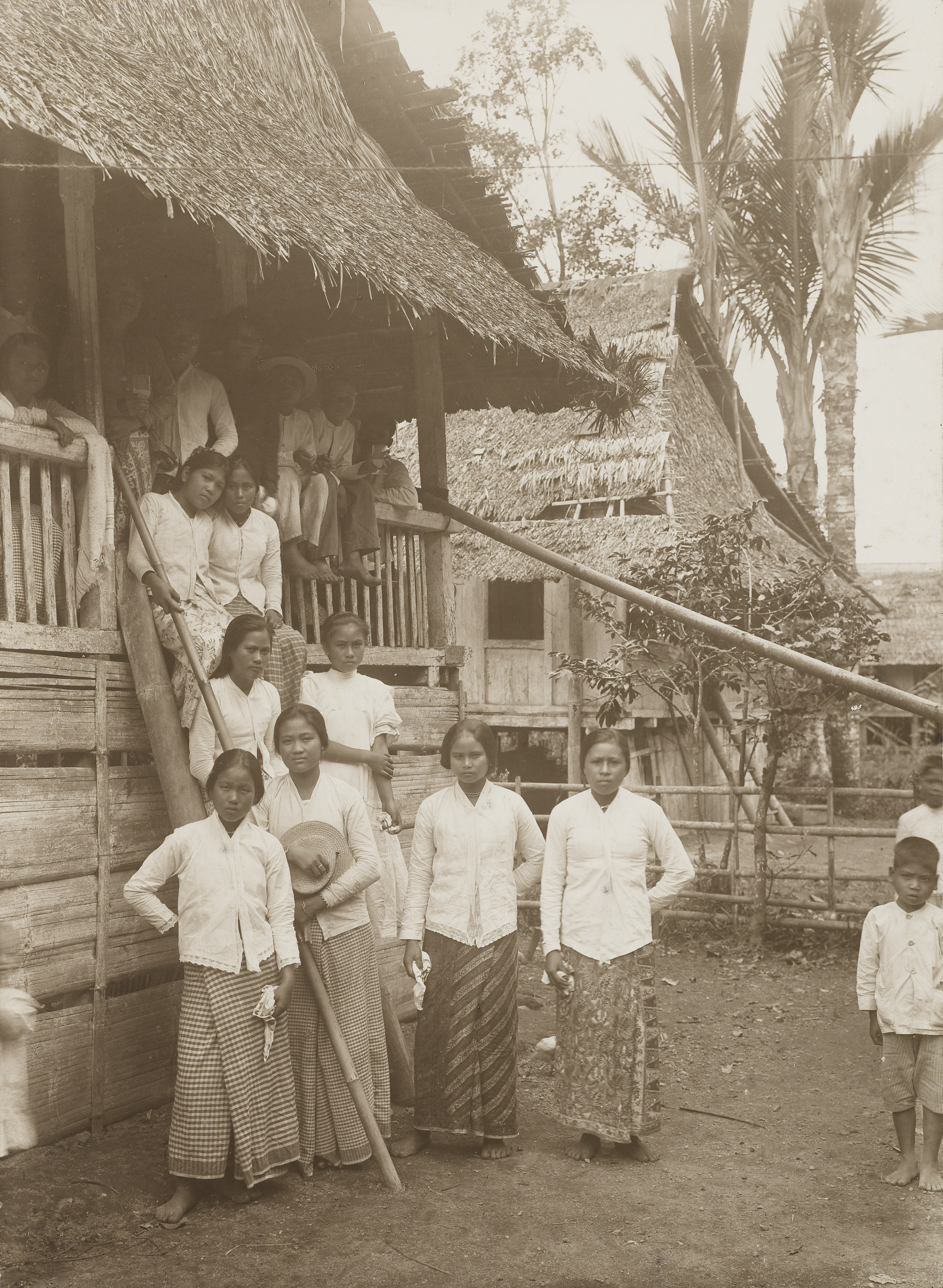
A group of local women wearing sarong and kebaya at the entrance of traditional house in a village at Minahasa, North Sulawesi, Indonesia c. 1900

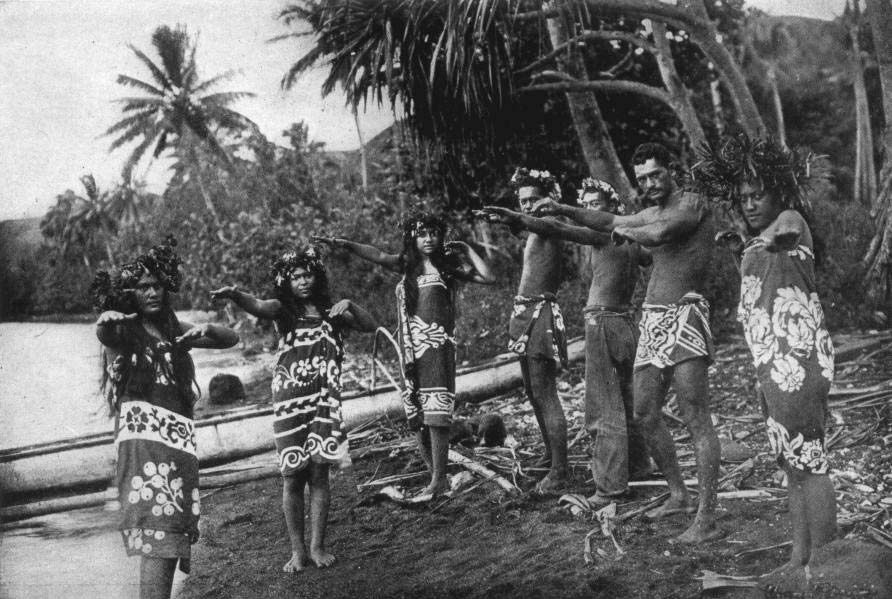
Polynesian Hiva Oa dancers dressed in pāreu around 1909

== In the media ==
The American public is most familiar with the sarong for the dozens of films set in the South Seas, most of them romantic dramas made in the 1930s and 1940s. Dorothy Lamour is by far the actress most linked with the garment, which was designed by Edith Head. Lamour starred in multiple films of this genre, starting with The Hurricane in 1937. In fact, Lamour was nicknamed "The Sarong Girl" by the press and even wore a sarong on occasion in more traditional films. Among the other actresses to don the sarong for film roles are Maria Montez, Gilda Gray, Myrna Loy, Gene Tierney, Frances Farmer and Movita. Male stars who wore the manly sarongs on film include Jon Hall, Ray Milland, Tyrone Power, Robert Preston and Sabu Dastagir, as well as Ralph Fiennes in The Constant Gardener and Pierce Brosnan in The Thomas Crown Affair.

The 2005 documentary film Soldiers in Sarong, directed by Lokendra Arambam, depicts the women's resistance movement in Manipur, North-East India. The 2020 Indonesian film Tarung Sarung depicts a martial arts tradition where combatants are joined together by the garment.

In Singapore, the term Sarong Party Girl refers to a local single Singaporean woman especially of Chinese ethnicity who favor socializing and having relationships with expatriate Caucasian men rather than the local ones.

== See also ==
- Dhoti
- Izaar
- Malong
- Mundu
- Pareo
- Patadyong
