= Eldivo =

Scientific classification
- Kingdom: Animalia
- Phylum: Arthropoda
- Subphylum: Chelicerata
- Class: Arachnida
- Order: Araneae
- Infraorder: Araneomorphae
- Family: Ctenidae
- Genus: Eldivo; Hazzi & Hormiga, 2024
- Species: E. tuxtlas

Binomial name
- Eldivo tuxtlas Hazzi & Hormiga, 2024

Species of spider

Eldivo is a monotypic genus of spiders in the family Ctenidae containing the single species, Eldivo tuxtlas.

== Distribution ==
Eldivo tuxtlas has been recorded from Mexico.

== Etymology ==
The genus is dedicated to the memory of Mexican singer and songwriter Alberto Aguilera Valadez, known colloquially as "El Divo".

The species is named after the type locality Reserva de la Biósfera Los Tuxtlas, a protected tropical rainforest in Veracruz.

== Taxonomy ==
Eldivo is the sister lineage to the genus Kiekie.
