= Pareo =

Tahitian skirt

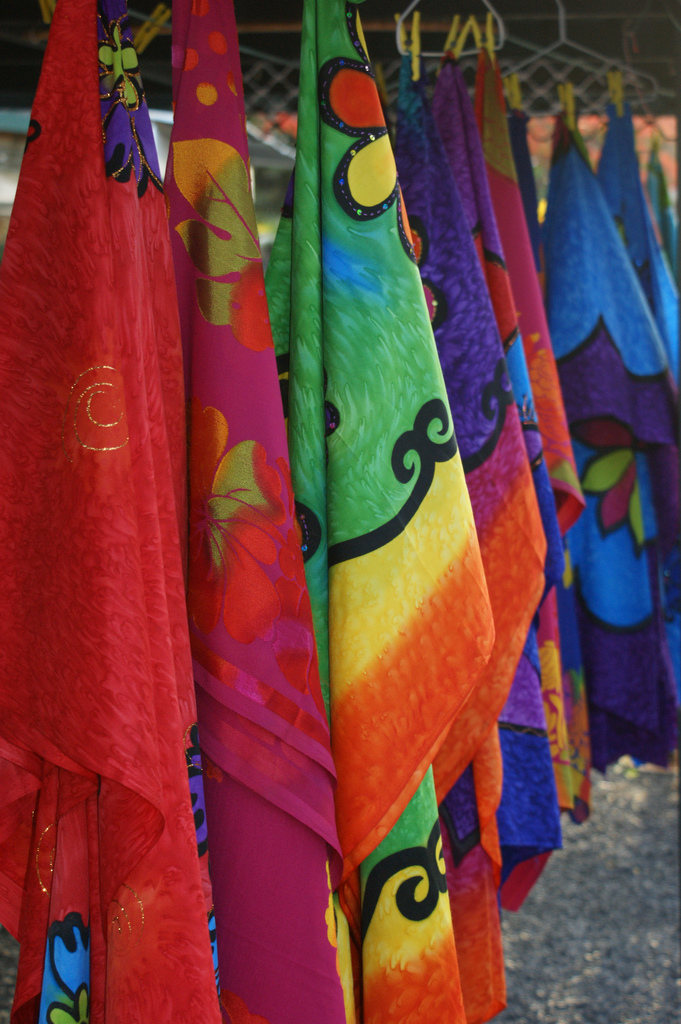
Pāreu on display in Rarotonga

A pāreu or pareo is a wraparound skirt worn in Tahiti. The term was originally used only for women's skirts, as men wore a loincloth, called a maro. Nowadays the term is used for any cloth worn wrapped around the body by men and women.

The pareo in Tahitian and pareu in Cook Islands were the first Pacific islands and original creators of the tapa board patterned prints.

== Name ==
In contemporary Tahitian the garment is called pāreu (singular: te pāreu, plural: te mau pāreu), with the pronunciation of the word with a long a (hold the sound for two beats rather than just one) and the e and u pronounced separately, rather than slurred into a diphthong: [pɑːreu].

It is not clear where the variant pareo comes from. It might be an old dialectic variant or an early explorers' misinterpretation. But both terms were already used in the 19th century (the Dutch geographic magazine De Aarde en haar Volken of 1887 had a few South-seas articles, some of them using pāreu, others pareo). Nowadays, however, pareo can be considered as the English-language form of the word (plural pareos), much less likely subject to mispronunciation.

== Styles ==
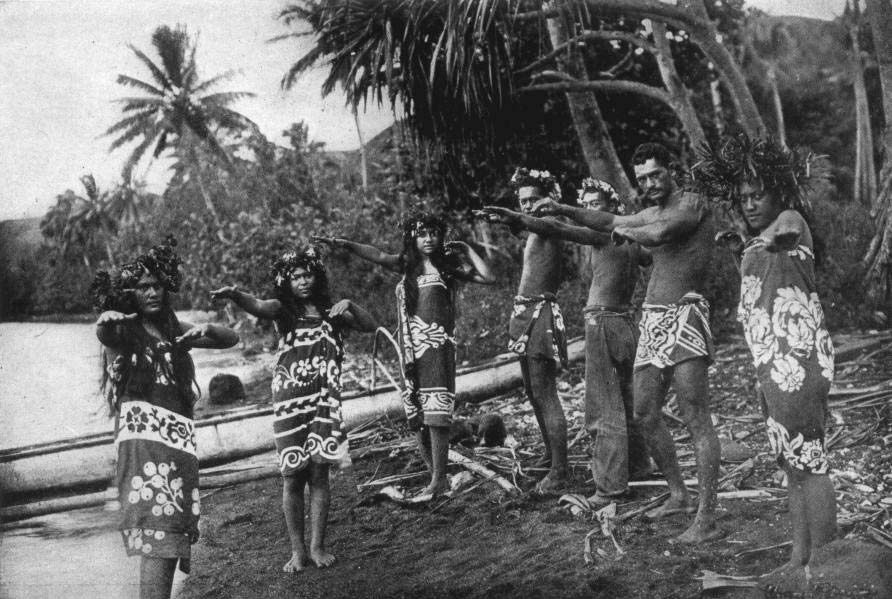
Hiva Oa dancers dressed in pāreu around 1909

The Tahitian pāreu are among the most colourful and bright of the Pacific. Originally flower patterns, the hibiscus flowers in particular, or traditional tapa patterns, were printed in bright colours on a cotton sheet of about 90 or 120 cm wide and 180 cm long. Nowadays they are also made in Tahiti itself and dye painting with varying colours is popular as well.

A pāreu can be worn in many ways. Women will usually wrap it around their upper body, covering it from breasts to above the knees. Either they rely on their breasts for it not to slide down, or they may wrap a corner around their shoulder or their neck. In more traditional surroundings the covering of the upper body is less important, but the covering of the thighs is. Then it is worn as a longer skirt. Men wear it as a short skirt, or may even make shorts out of it, especially when fishing or working in the bush where freedom of movement of the legs is needed. But during quiet, cooler nights at home, they may wear it as a long skirt too.

The ends of the pāreu are normally tied in a knot to keep it in place.

== See also ==
- Lavalava
- Sarong
