= Capulana =

Type of sarong worn in Africa

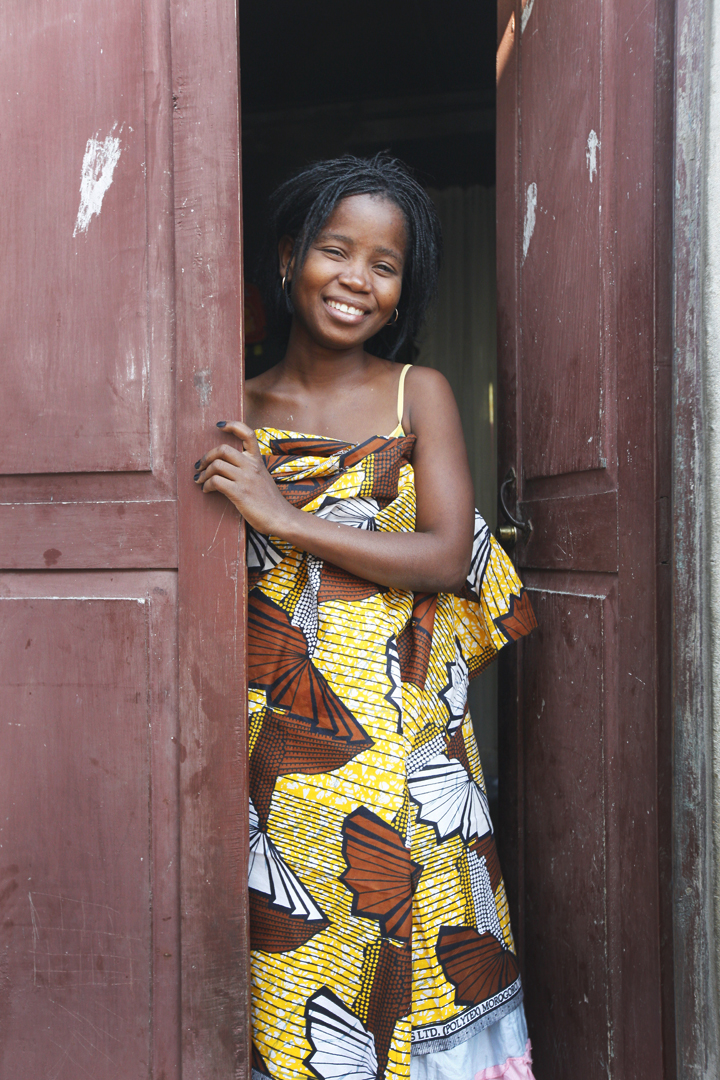
Mozambican woman using a capulana.

A capulana (also spelled "kapulana", or in Changana "nguvu" or "vemba") is a type of a sarong worn primarily in Mozambique but also in other areas of Southeastern Africa. It is a length of material about 2 metres by 1 metre. It can either be used as a wrap-around skirt, dress or can become a baby carrier on the back. It is considered a complete piece of clothing.

Capulanas have been in Mozambique since the establishment of the Arab/Indian trade routes. It was received from Indian traders as a means of trade for other goods. First, they came primarily in three colors: red, white, and black. White represented the protection of the ancestors, black represented evil, and red represented the spirit of war. After this time, Mozambicans preferred using capulanas to the traditionally-used animal skins. Due to Africa's wildlife and environment, the most common early designs included suns, leopards, lions, the style "ndjiti" (a white and red geometric design), the style "xithango" (plaid, with the word meaning "shield"), and the style "ximangelani" (wild birds spotted black and white). These styles were dominant until the advent of the Portuguese Colonial power. Today, these early styles of capulana are used primarily by "tinyanga" (witch doctors, spirit healers, "curandeiros"). "Palu", a style with very small plaid patterns in blue and white, was also popular in early years of the capulana.

Today, there are many kinds of capulanas of various designs and colors. The capulana is often worn with a headscarf and tailored blouse in Mozambique. They are used in a variety of manners, including everyday casual-wear, carrying heavy loads, or even careful tailored for special events. Early traditional colors and styles of capulana are highly coveted and sell for higher prices in markets today. In Mozambique they have a high value and are considered particularly beautiful.

Brightly colored, capulanas are often offered as gifts to women. Some couples make matching capulana outfits for special events or for a significant reason such as a traditional marriage between the two.
