= Nima tapu =

Tongan royal family undertakers

Nima tapu (lit. 'sacred hands') are the royal undertakers for the Tongan royal family. It is their role to prepare the dead king's body for burial. Once the preparation is complete, they are not allowed to use their hands for any other purpose for the next hundred days. In earlier times, the nima tapu would be strangled or have their hands cut off after preparing the king's body.

== See also ==
- Tongan funerals
