= Taʻovala =

Tongan traditional woven garment

A just married couple still in their wedding taʻovala

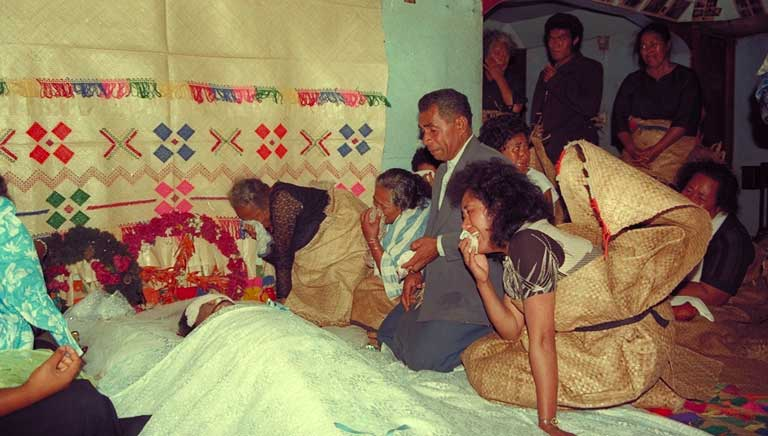
Different types of taʻovala worn at funerals

A taʻovala is an article of Tongan dress, a mat wrapped around the waist, worn by men and women, at all formal occasions, much like the tie for men in the Western culture. The taʻovala is also commonly seen among the Fijian Lau Islands, and Wallis island, both regions once heavily influenced by Tongan hegemony and cultural diffusion.

== Origins ==
According to a Tongan story, a group of Tongans once arrived by boat at the Tuʻi Tonga. They had had a rough ride and their clothing, if any remained, was not respectable. They cut the sail of their boat (Polynesian sails are also mats) in pieces and wrapped them around. The king was so pleased by the sacrifice they had made to him of their expensive sail that he ordered this dress to be court dress from then on. The Tongan waist-mat probably shares a common origin or inspiration as the Samoan valatau or vala waistband often donned by orators and chiefly sons (manaia) and daughters (taupou) on festive occasions and rituals.

== Usage ==
Queen Salote Tupou III ordered the taʻovala to be part of the civil servants' uniform. The use of the taʻovala for men is therefore extremely common in Tonga. For women, it is somewhat less common, as they prefer a kiekie.

The standard taʻovala, for formal and semi-formal wear, is a short mat coming halfway up the thighs. It is wrapped around the waist and tied with a kafa, a traditional rope often made of woven coconut coir or human hair belonging to a deceased ancestor. The mat worn on festive occasions, such as to one's own wedding, is much larger, finely woven, and often very nicely decorated. This fine variant of taʻovala is known as the ngafingafi, and corresponds to the 'Ie Tōga of the Samoans. The value of individual ngafingafi is determined by its colour, which may range from bleached white to a rich shade of tan or even coffee, depending on its age; the darker the colour, the greater the age, and the higher the value and prestige of the fine mat. Likewise, the taʻovala for a funeral is also a huge mat, but much coarser and undecorated, woven from the rougher side of the pandanus leaf. If the wearer is of an inferior rank to the deceased, then the mat to be donned would be old, well-worn, and tied in such a way as to wrap around the upper body and veil the head. The older and more torn it is, the better. All these special mats are kept as precious heirlooms.

Taʻovala are part of the koloa, the handicraft goods made by the women. Every woman can do it. If girls do not learn it at home, it will be taught at school. More recently, however, some women specialise in the handicraft and sell their products on the market.

== Materials ==
Taʻovala can be made from different materials, which can be either natural or synthetic:

- Strips of pandanus leaves, usually unpainted.

Although sometimes black strips are used, the taʻovala is rarely wholly black.
The strips range from coarse (15 mm or so as for funerals) to fine (a couple of millimeters, as the taʻovala loukeha, in which one is dressed to visit the king).
Mats are always woven by hand, especially the fine mats. Making fine mats is labor-intensive, takes a long time to complete, and therefore they are expensive. The oldest and most valuable Tongan fine mats are preserved by the Tongan royal family to wear on formal occasions.

- Strips of hibiscus bast fiber, called fau.

Same as the pandanus leaves, but not as coarse and as such, they can be plaited in a variety of patterns, which is faster and cheaper than weaving them by hand.
Most of the civil servants' taʻovala are made in this way.

- Plastic, particularly material obtained from old flour bags.

Old flour bags are preferred as an alternative source material that is quickly available – does not require lengthy preparation.

== History ==
Before the advent of Western influence, the men wore a fringe skirt of native materials about 25 to 30 inches (60 to 80 cm) long. Women traditionally wore two mats about a yard (metre) square each, made by weaving pandanus and hibiscus leaves together, and belted around the waist. Children were usually naked. The Christian missionaries who began arriving in the late 19th century influenced the islanders' notions of modesty.

== See also ==
- Lava-lava
