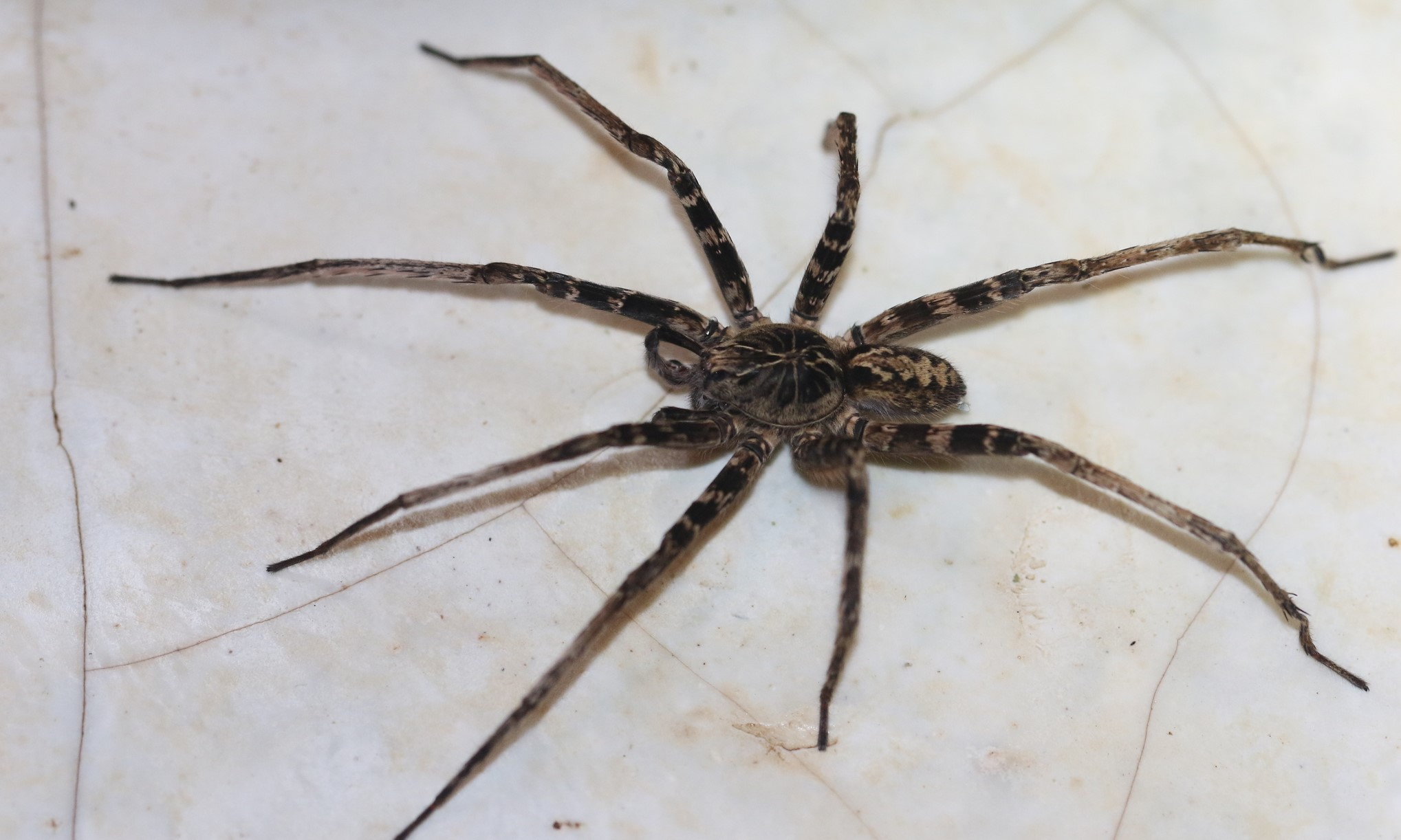
- Kiekie antioquia

Scientific classification
- Kingdom: Animalia
- Phylum: Arthropoda
- Subphylum: Chelicerata
- Class: Arachnida
- Order: Araneae
- Infraorder: Araneomorphae
- Family: Ctenidae
- Genus: Kiekie; Polotow & Brescovit, 2018

Type species
- Ctenus sinuatipes (F. O. Pickard-Cambridge, 1897)

Species
- 11, see text

= Kiekie (spider) =

Genus of spiders

Kiekie is a genus of wandering spiders first described by D. Polotow and Antônio Domingos Brescovit in 2018. The type species, Kiekie sinuatipes, was originally described under the name "Ctenus sinuatipes".

== Species ==
As of October 2025, this genus includes eighteen species:

- Kiekie almae Omelko, 2023 – Panama
- Kiekie antioquia Polotow & Brescovit, 2018 – Colombia
- Kiekie barrantesi Hazzi & Hormiga, 2024 – Costa Rica
- Kiekie barrocolorado Polotow & Brescovit, 2018 – Costa Rica, Panama
- Kiekie bernali Hazzi & Hormiga, 2024 – Panama
- Kiekie curvipes (Keyserling, 1881) – Mexico, Guatemala, Honduras, Nicaragua, Costa Rica, Panama
- Kiekie dietrichi Omelko, 2023 – Panama
- Kiekie garifuna Polotow & Brescovit, 2018 – Mexico, Guatemala, Honduras
- Kiekie griswoldi Polotow & Brescovit, 2018 – Costa Rica
- Kiekie lamuerte Hazzi & Hormiga, 2024 – Cost Rica
- Kiekie laselva Hazzi & Hormiga, 2024 – Costa Rica
- Kiekie montanense Polotow & Brescovit, 2018 – Costa Rica, Panama
- Kiekie panamensis Polotow & Brescovit, 2018 – Panama, Colombia, Ecuador
- Kiekie sarapiqui Polotow & Brescovit, 2018 – Costa Rica
- Kiekie sinuatipes (F. O. Pickard-Cambridge, 1897) – Panama, Costa Rica (type species)
- Kiekie tirimbina Hazzi & Hormiga, 2024 – Costa Rica
- Kiekie valerioi Hazzi & Hormiga, 2024 – Costa Rica
- Kiekie verbena Polotow & Brescovit, 2018 – Costa Rica

== See also ==
- Ctenus
- Eldivo, a sister genus
