= Kiekie (clothing) =

Tongan dress

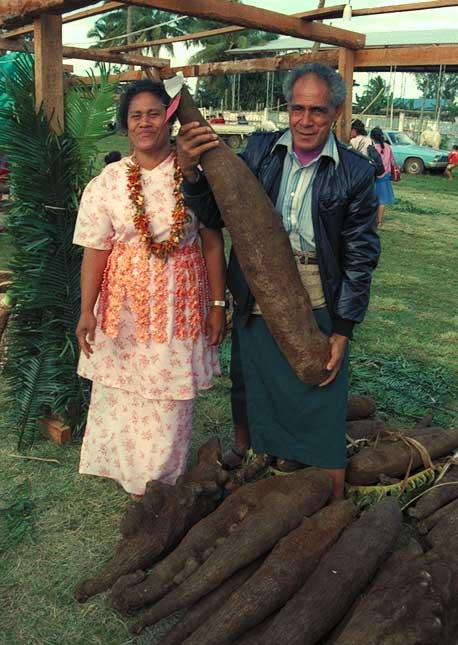
The farmer's wife wears a kiekie knitted from plastic rope. The round shapes are known as vana (sea-urchins)

A kiekie is a Tongan dress, an ornamental girdle around the waist, mainly worn by women on semiformal occasions, but nowadays also sometimes by men. At highly formal occasions both gender will settle for a taʻovala. At casual occasions no girdle is needed for any gender, although women may continue wearing a kiekie even then, as it is considered an easy sitting, nice looking decoration, with which one can show off. (All taʻovala look more or less the same, and are usually quite stiff and hot to wear).

The characteristic of a kiekie is that it is between a mat and a grass skirt (manafau): it is a string skirt attached to a waistband. It is supposed to be somewhat transparent, showing the skirt or tupenu worn under it. The strings can be short as a mini skirt, or down to the ankles, but down to somewhat above the knees is most common.

Related to the kiekie is the sisi, where the strings are sī leaves or plaited maile leaves, but where the waistband, full with sweet smelling flowers and fruits, is more important. Sisi are worn by both gender during dance performances.

Kiekie are part of the koloa, the handicraft goods made by the women. Every woman can do it, although nowadays we see that some women specialise in it and sell their products on the market.

Kiekie can be made from many different materials, both natural and introduced:

- strips of pandanus leaves, often painted in bright colours. Either hanging loose, or plaited together. The salusalu is a long kiekie, especially for Haʻapai.
- strips of hibiscus bast fiber, called fau. Same as the pandanus leaves, but not as coarse and therefore suited for finer designs.
- kaka, de fibrous tissue which is wrapped around the growing fronds of palm trees. It is usually varnished to make it stronger and then cut in all type of shapes.
- strings or ropes
- little disks (few centimeter diameter) made from coconut shell and strung together along their diameter.
- New Zealand flax, a Māori piupiu (see Pania).

== Gallery ==
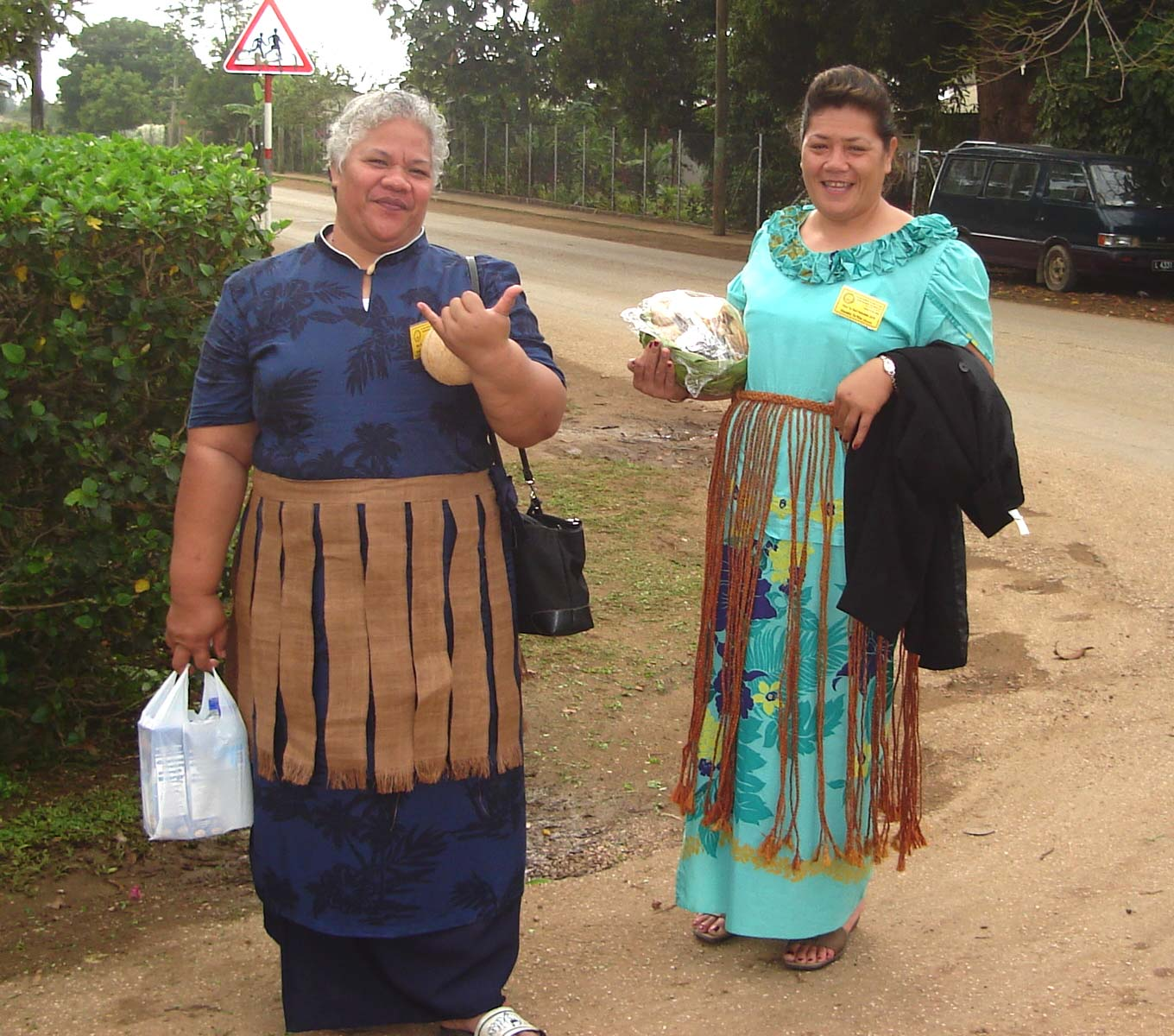

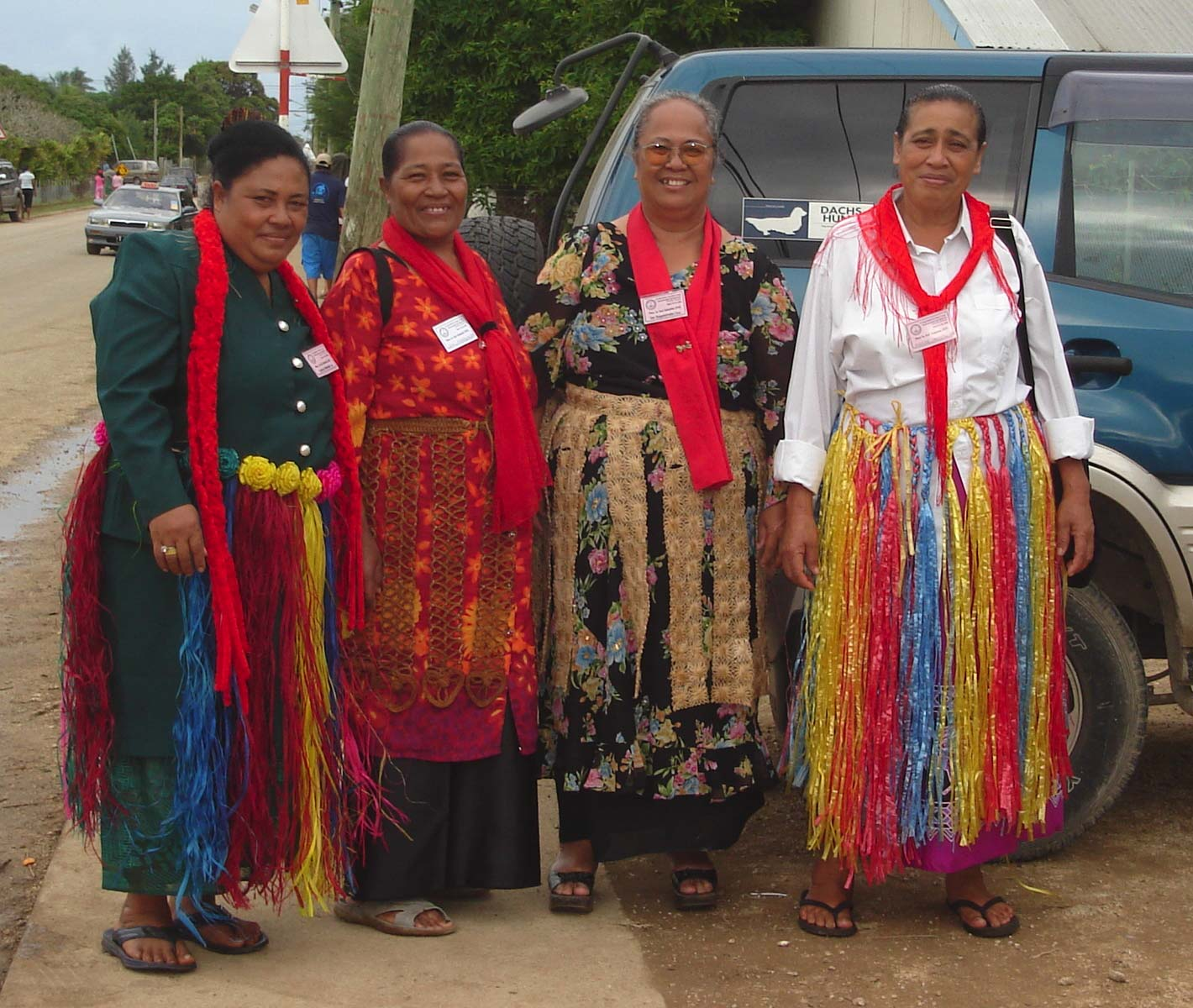

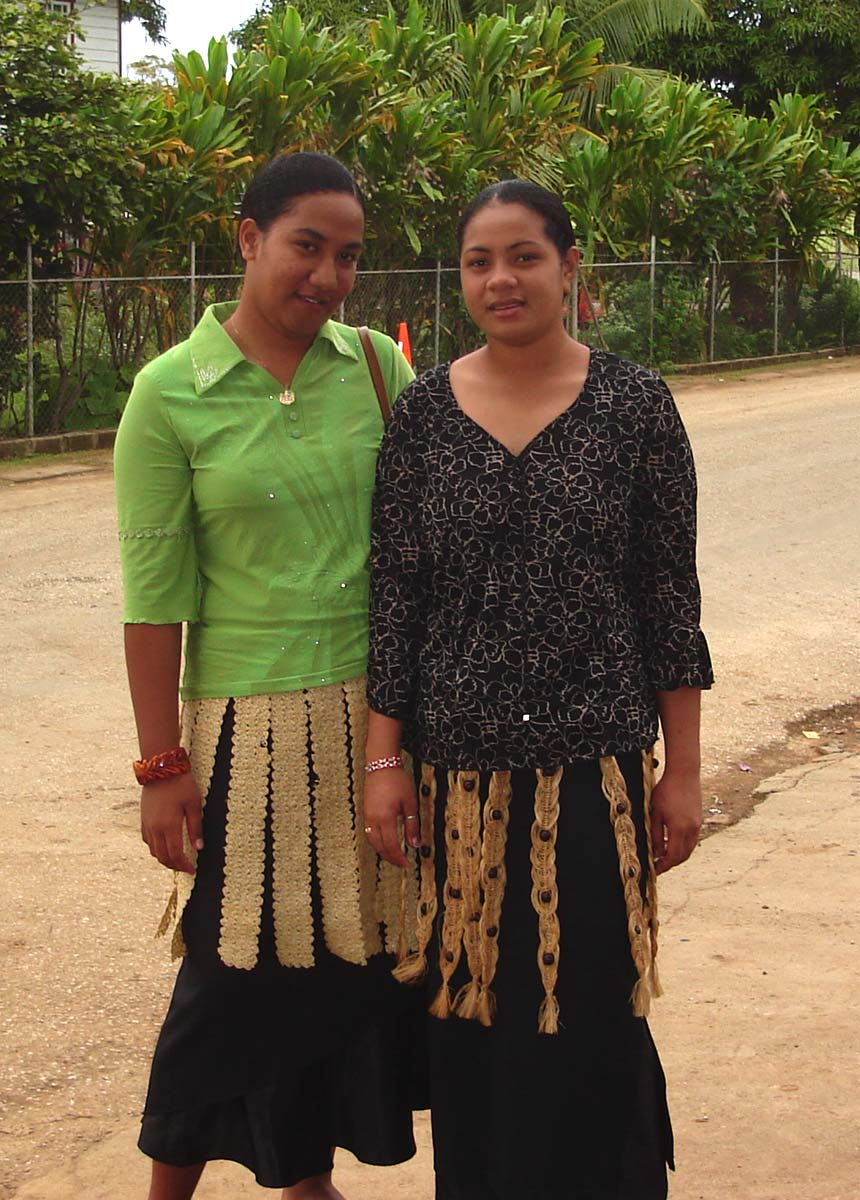
