= Fashion and clothing in the Philippines =

Fashion and folk costume of the Philippines

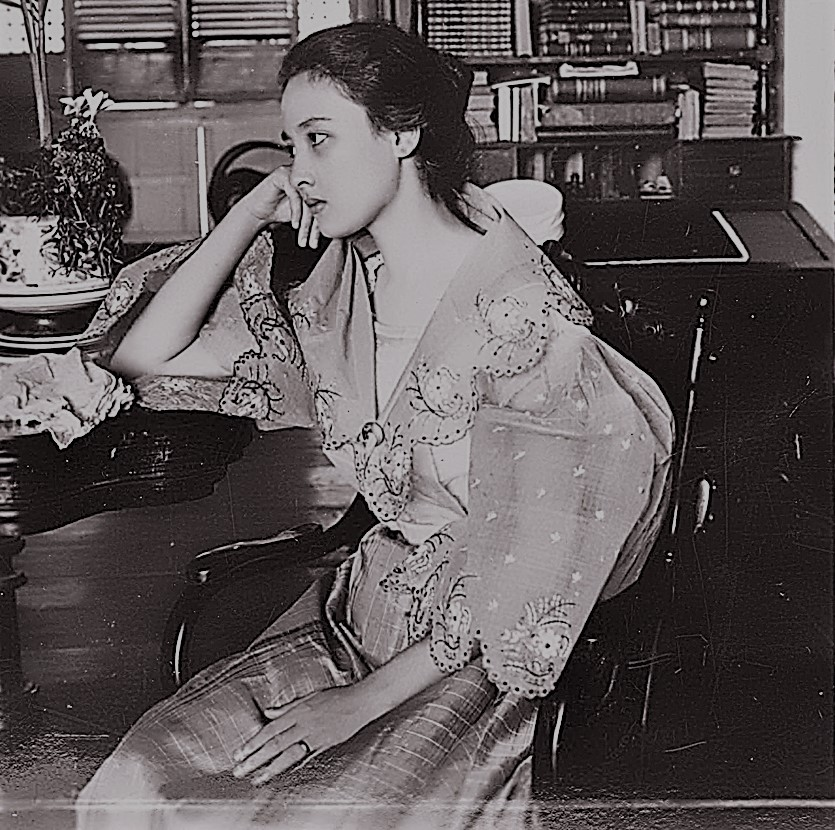
A Philippine lady, 1897

The clothing style and fashion sense of the Philippines in the modern-day era have been influenced by the indigenous peoples, the Spaniards, and the Americans, as evidenced by the chronology of events that occurred in Philippine history.

== History ==
=== Pre-colonial period ===
During the pre-colonial period of the Philippines, men and women in most ethnic groups wore a simple collar-less shirt or jacket with close-fitting sleeves known as the baro (Tagalog for "shirt" or "clothing", with cognates like barú, badu, bado, or bayú in other Philippine languages; and baju in Malaysia and Indonesia). These were made from rough linen-like cloth woven from native abacá fiber, or from imported fabrics woven from silk, cotton, and kapok, among others. The design of the original baro was influenced by trade and contact with neighboring regions. These influences include the Malay and Javanese baju, and the South Asian kurta.

Among Tagalog men, the baro were commonly paired with loose trousers known as salawal (also spelled salaual) or a rectangular wraparound cloth known as tapis. The salawal were loose knee-length or shin-length trousers adapted from the Persian sirwal (probably via Malays). Similar trousers are still worn by various indigenous groups in Mindanao today, such as the Bagobo saruar, the Blaan salwal, and the Maranao saroar; though these are usually more tight-fitting than the salawal.

Pre colonial filipino noble clothing

The tapis (also known as patadyong or malong in other Philippine ethnic groups, among other names) is a native tubular or rectangular wraparound cloth that covers the wearer from the waist down. It is worn by both men and women.

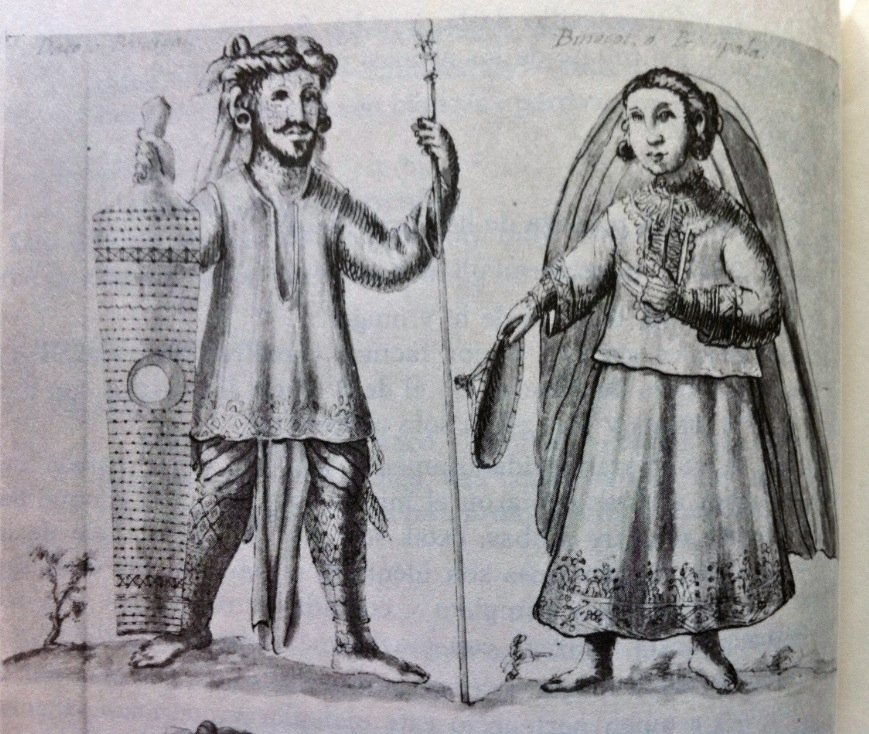
Traditional tunic (badu) worn with a bahag by a Visayan datu (left) from Historia natural del sitio, fertilidad y calidad de las Islas e Indios de Bisayas (c. 1668)

The baro usually extend to just slightly below the waist. However, in the Visayas, aside from similar shirts or tunics (known as badu, bado, or báyò in Cebuano, Waray, and Hiligaynon, respectively), men also wore colorful robe-like and coat-like variants that could extend to well below the knees (known as the marlota and baquero in Spanish, respectively). These were sometimes belted at the waist. Among Tagalogs, red dyes and gold trimmings were indicative of being a member of nobility (maginoo) or the warrior caste (maharlika).

These clothing were usually colorful with specific patterns and ornamentation (like beadwork) specific to different ethnic groups.

Another common item of clothing is the loincloth generally known as the bahag. They could be made from barkcloth or from woven textiles, with the colors and quality often indicative of the status of the wearer. They functioned as the most basic covering for modesty and were worn as everyday casual lower garments. Among the heavily tattooed Visayans, it was also common for nobility to wear bahag specifically so they can show off leg tattoos that indicate rank and prestige.

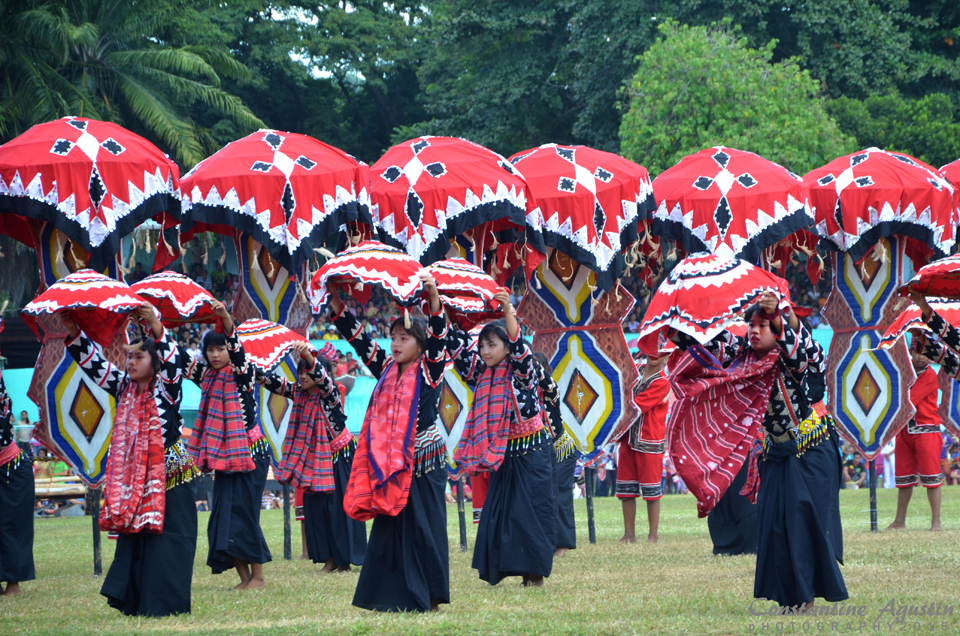
The s'laong kinibang, a type of women's salakot headdress among the T'boli people

Coastal lowlander groups like the Tagalogs and Visayans, also bound their foreheads and temples with long, narrow strips of cloth called putong. Necks were covered with gold necklaces, and wrists with golden armlets called calombigas – these had intricate patterns. Others would wear precious stones. The usual male headdress was the pudong, a turban; though in Panay, both men and women also wore a head cloth or bandana called saplung. Commoners wore pudong of rough abaca cloth wrapped around only a few turns so that it was more of a headband than a turban and was therefore called pudong-pudong – as the crowns and diadems on Christian images were later called. A red pudong was called magalong, and was the insignia of braves who had killed an enemy.

Another common pre-colonial headdress worn that can be worn over the head kerchiefs is the salakot (with various names in different ethnic groups). These were lightweight headgear worn as protection from the sun and rain. They were usually cone or dome-shaped, and can range in size from having very wide brims to being almost helmet-like. They were made from various materials including bamboo, rattan, nito ferns, and bottle gourd. They could also be cloth-covered or lacquered for waterproofing. The salakot is held in place by an inner headband and a chinstrap. The tip of the crown commonly has a spiked or knobbed finial made of metal or wood.

The earliest recorded mention of a salakot was in 1521 when Antonio Pigafetta of Ferdinand Magellan's expedition described a "queen who wore a large hat of palm leaves in the manner of parasol, with a crown about it of the same leaves like the tiara of the pope; and she never goes any place without such one."

Women in the pre-colonial Philippines also commonly wore traditional shawls known as the

alampay, which later evolved to become the pañuelo during the Spanish colonial period.

=== Spanish period ===
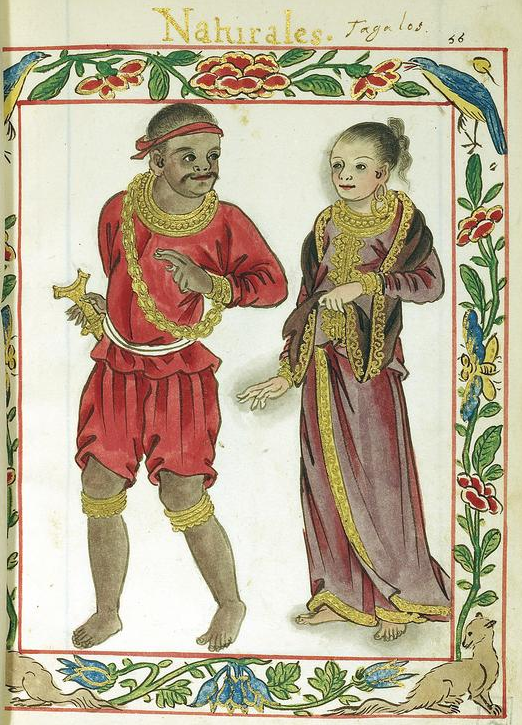
Tagalog maginoo (nobility) couple wearing baro upper garments in the Boxer Codex c. 1590's early Spanish colonial period. Their lower garments are the salawal and the tapis, for the man and woman, respectively

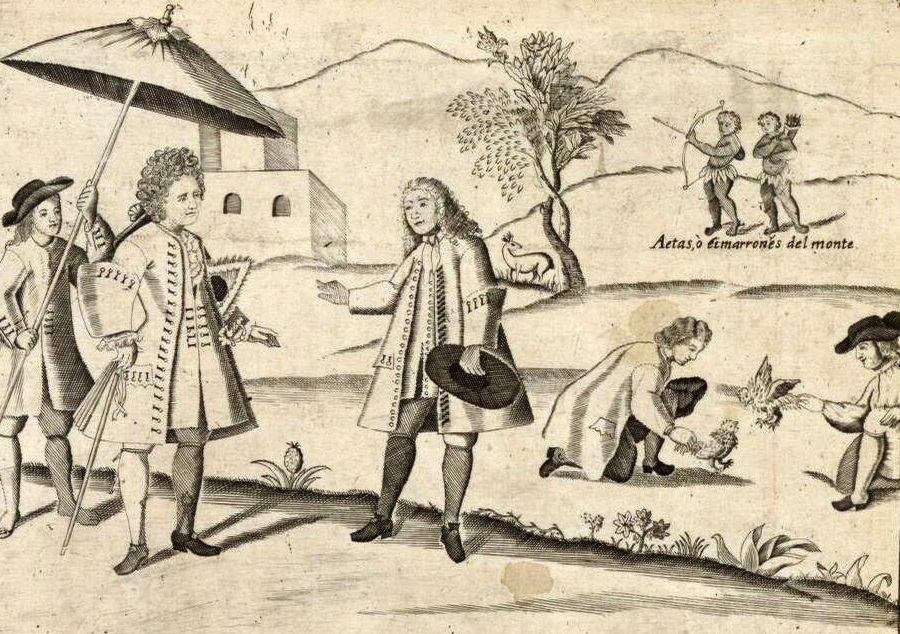
Aetas, Peninsulares, Criollo, and Indios doing cockfight all in their attires. detail from Carta Hydrographica y Chorographica de las Yslas Filipinas (1734)

Early records of clothing in the Philippines during the Spanish colonial era from the 16th to the 18th centuries were limited, thus the exact evolution of the precolonial baro to the modern barong tagalog and baro't saya can not be established with precision. Based on illustrations and written accounts, however, baro were still largely only worn by commoners during this period. They were mostly identical to precolonial baro and were made from opaque linen-like abacá textiles, and thus lacked the collars, buttons, and embroidery of later baro styles. The couturier Jose "Pitoy" Moreno has hypothesized that this transitional style of shirt was the camisa de chino of later centuries, which makes it a precursor to the barong tagalog. Depictions of members of the principalia upper classes (including natives and mestizos) in the 18th century showed that they invariably wore European-style clothing.

==== Women's fashion ====
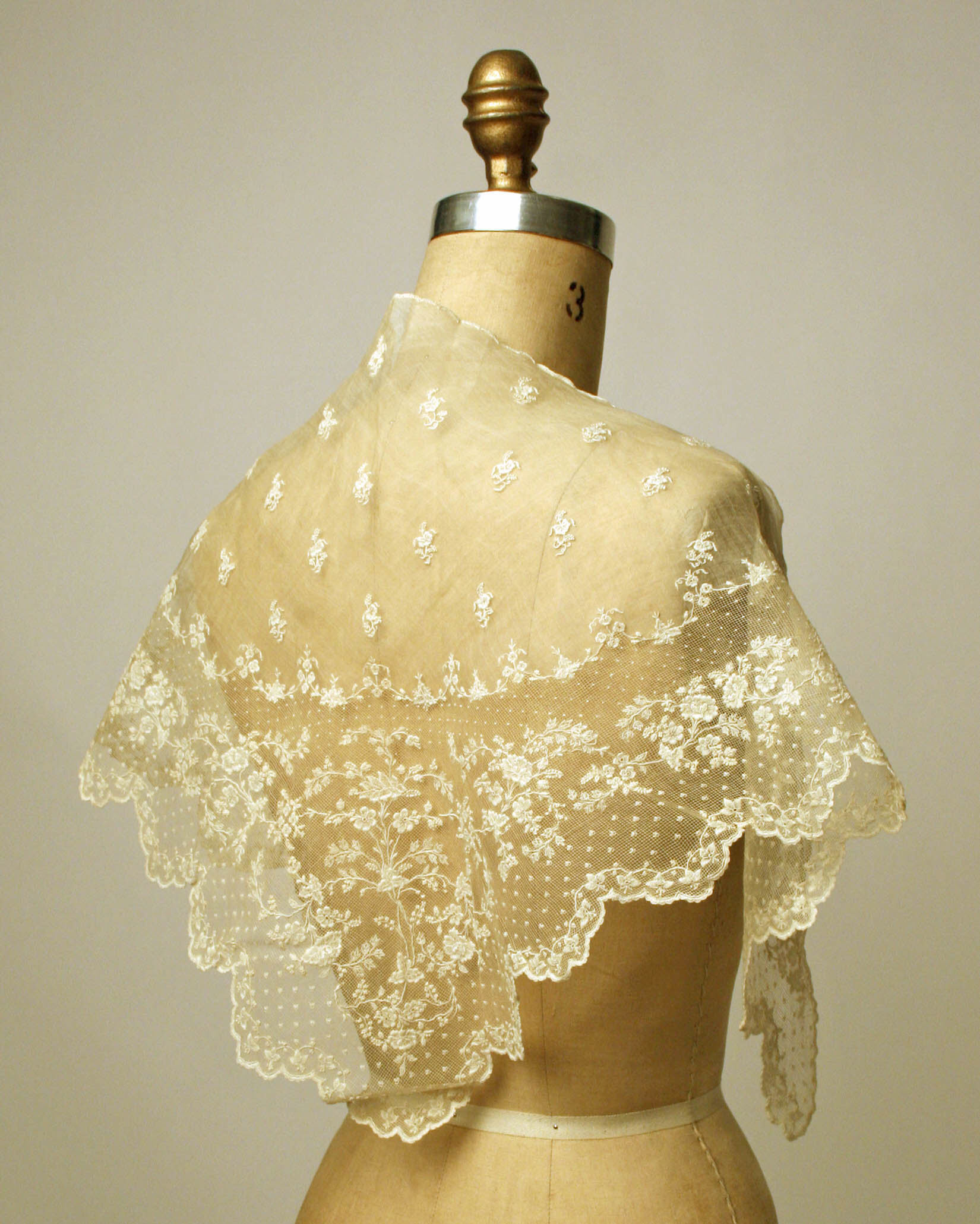
Early 19th century pañuelo from the Metropolitan Museum of Art

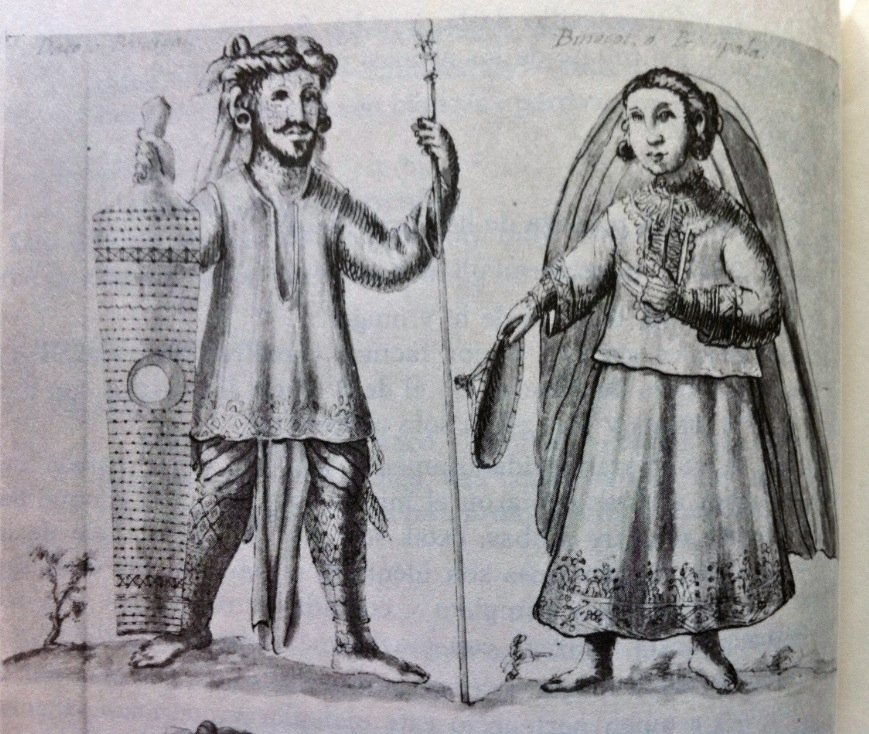
A Visayan datu wearing bahag under a long cotton tunic (baro), with clearly seen tattooed legs and face. He is accompanied by a binukot or local princess with golden bangles. Depicted in Historia de las Islas e Indios de Bisayas (1668) by Francisco Ignacio Alcina.

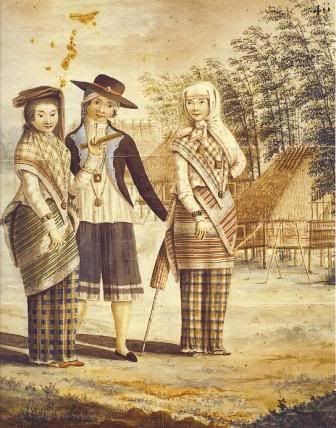
Mestizos de Manila by Juan Ravenet showing the women's narrow pares saya and men's clothing among the 18th century aristocracy in the Philippines (c. 1792-1794)

The pre-colonial tapis lower garments of women, on the other hand, were deemed immodest by the Spanish clergy early in the colonial period. They introduced the long skirt (known by the Spanish name saya or falda) to be worn under the tapis. In the Visayas, the patadyong was tolerated for longer, although it was eventually also replaced with the saya in the 19th century. This type of clothing is what became known as the baro't saya, with aristocratic versions of which also referred to as the traje de mestiza (also called the Maria Clara gown in modern times). By the late 18th century, the traditional everyday wear of women in the Philippines consisted of two basic pieces of clothing known as the pares ("pair"). This consisted of a saya reaching up to the ankles (usually checkered) and a collar-less baro or camisa (usually plain or striped). The name pares was more closely associated with the skirt, which unlike later saya were narrow and sheath-like, resembling precolonial tapis. They were secured at the waist by strings and had wide, flat pleats along the waistline held together by pins. The baro was more or less identical to precolonial baro, with long narrow sleeves. Like later ensembles, these two pieces of clothing were usually complemented by a tapis (which was now worn as an overskirt) and a kerchief around the shoulders known as the pañuelo, fichu, or alampay (made from the same opaque material as the skirts).

The fabrics used for early sayas were usually native textiles (particularly textiles made by highlander Visayans in Panay). Later on in the 19th century, they began to use similar imported textiles, most notably the cambaya imported from India.

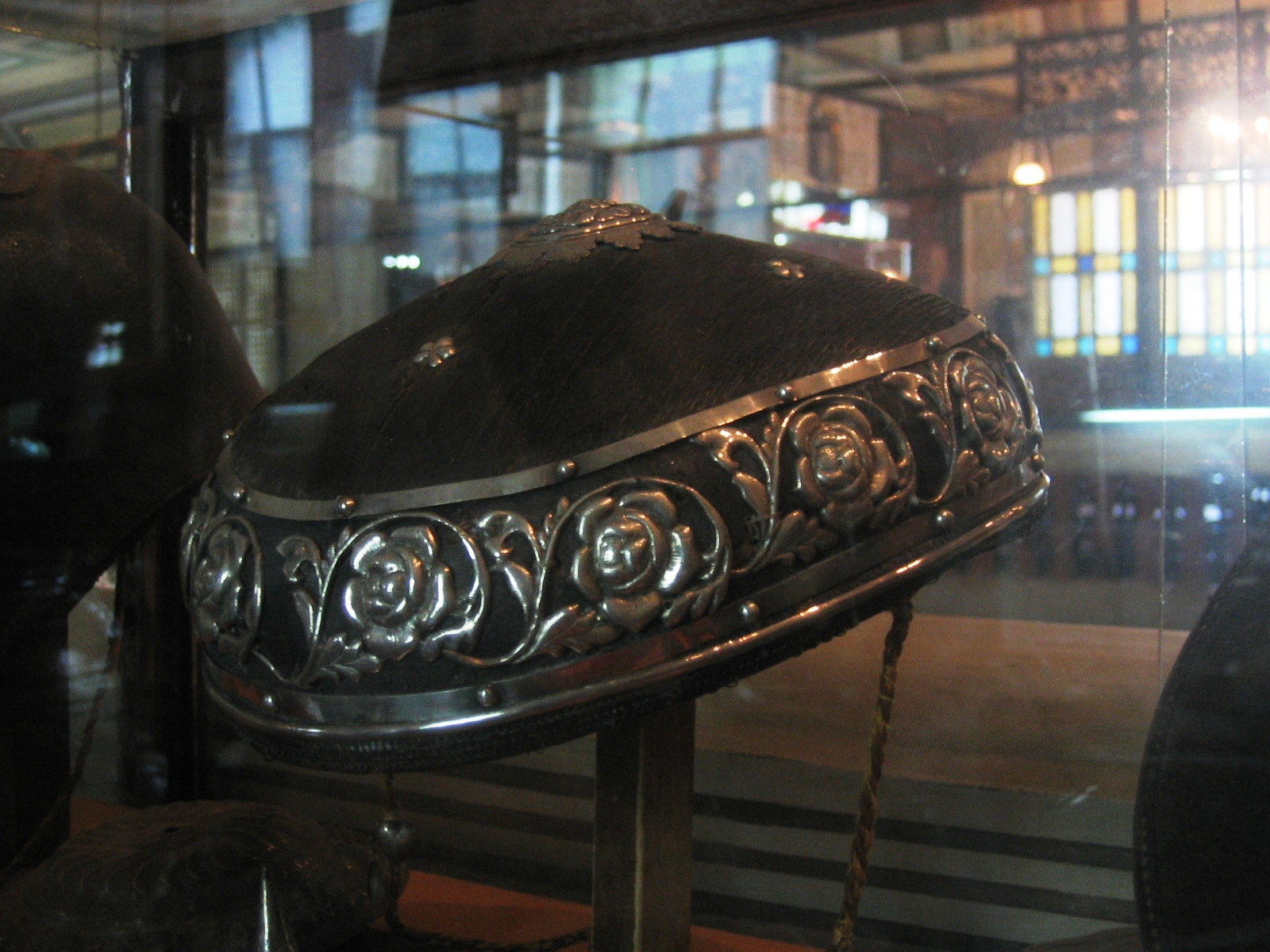
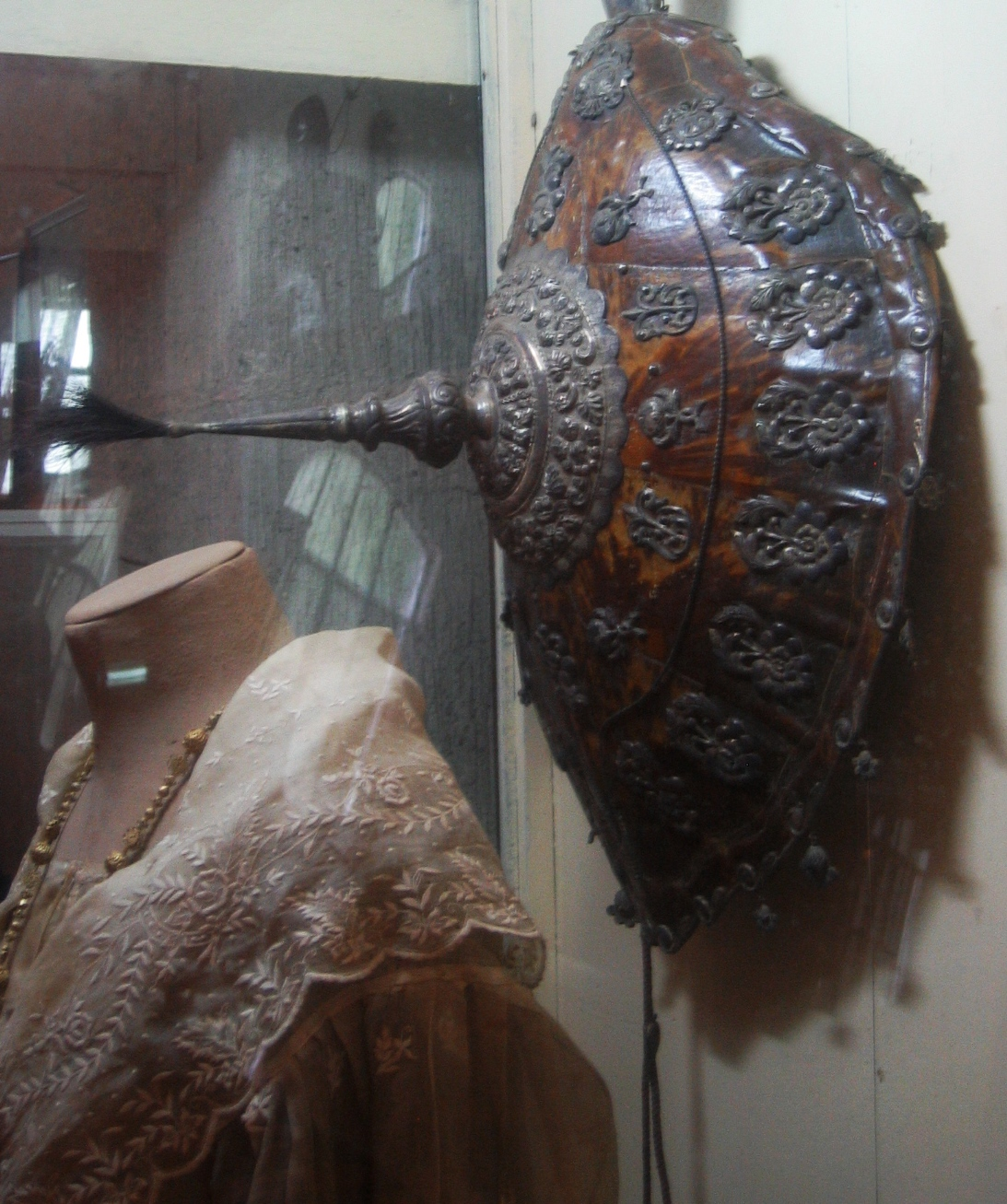
Left to right: [1] Silver‑inlaid Salakot, San Pablo, Laguna; [2] Tortoise-shell and silver Salakot.

The narrow width of the 18th-century pares saya, however, made them impractical for everyday life. By the 1820s to 1840s, the saya was replaced by a billowy western-style skirt known as the saya a la mascota. For women of the upper classes (principalia), they were usually ankle-length; while for women in the lower classes, they usually reached down to mid-calf to facilitate freer movement while working. Knee-length versions were also allowed for young girls.

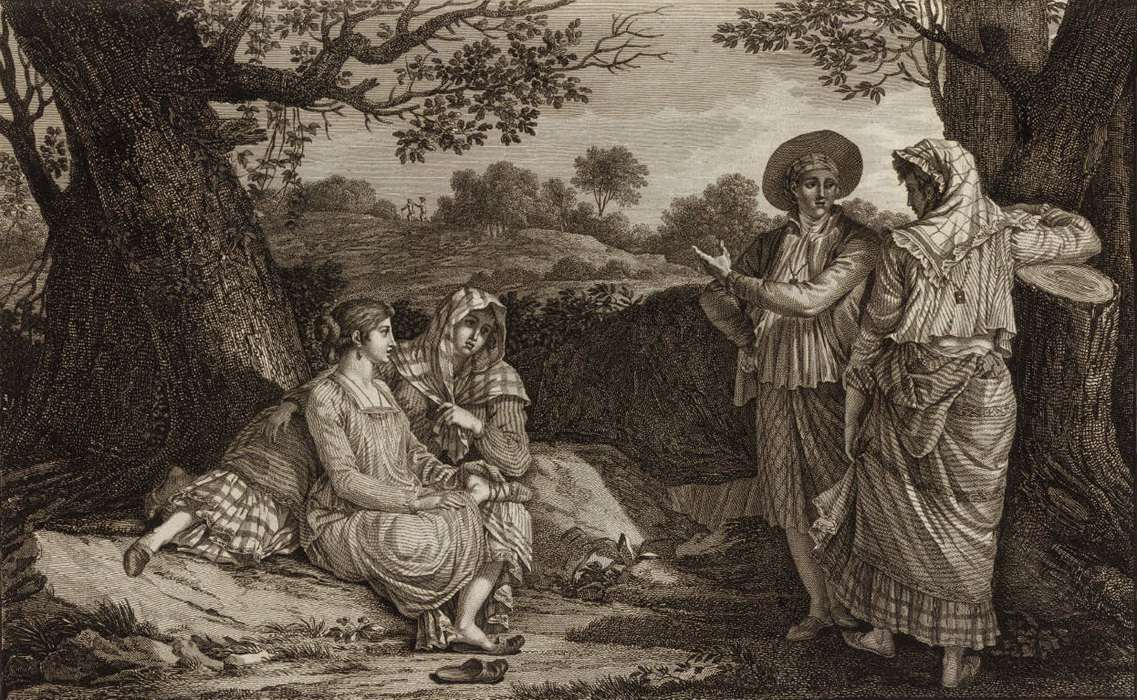
Natives in Manila shown from the voyage of Lapérouse (c. 1792)

Designs and elements of the dress also later diverged sharply between the lower classes and the aristocratic Principalia classes from the mid-19th century onwards. The tapis for example, which was unique to Philippine women's attire, became much shorter between the 1840s to the 1860s. Due to this, they became more restricted to the native indios, while Spanish women and some mestizas avoided wearing it because of its resemblance to the delantal (aprons) worn by servants. This dichotomy was depicted in José Rizal's 1887 novel Noli Me Tángere where the mestiza protagonist María Clara wore a tapis and a baro't saya, while the pretentious Doña Consolación (a native married to a peninsular) wore European-style dresses without the tapis.

==== Men's fashion ====
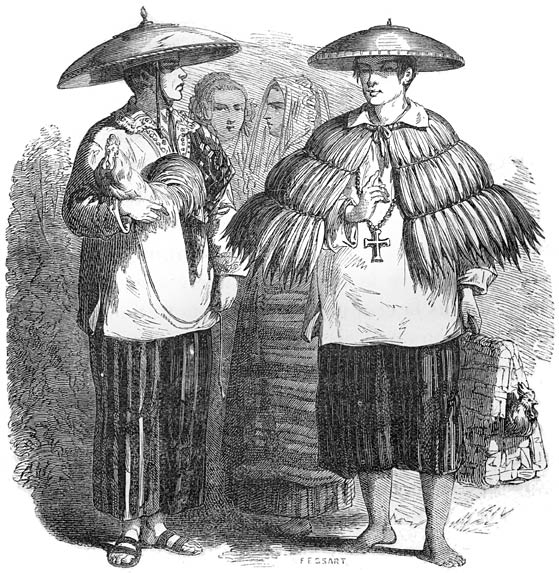
Full traditional Tagalog attire for working-class commoners during the Spanish colonial era, with barong tagalog, vestido anajao (indigenous rain capes), and salakot headwear (c. 1855)

The first barong tagalog precursor to gain favor among the local and mestizo elites was the barong mahaba (literally "long baro") which became prominent starting from the 1820s. These were much longer than the modern barong tagalog, reaching down to slightly above the knees. They were also commonly striped with bold colors like blue, red, or green. However, they already displayed hallmarks of the modern barong tagalog, including being made of sheer nipis material, embroidery, long sleeves, and a loose silhouette with slits on both sides. However, they lacked buttons. Early examples of barong mahaba usually had high-standing collars or even Elizabethan-style ruffs with narrow cravats. Barong mahaba were generally worn with colorful straight-cut trousers with stripes, checkers, or plaid-like patterns (generally made from imported cambaya, rayadillo, and guingón fabrics), top hats (sombrero de copa), and a type of embroidered velvet or leather slip-on shoes known as corchos. While barong mahaba were generally worn loose, they were sometimes fastened by silk strings through three openings around the waist, either over or under the shirt. The sheer fabric used by barong mahaba also necessitated the wearing of an undershirt, known as camisón or camiseta, which was also worn on its own by commoners.

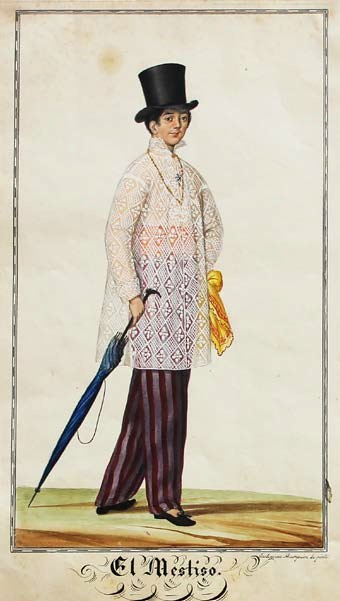
Barong mahaba with a ruff collar depicted in El Mestiso by Justiniano Asuncion (c. 1841)

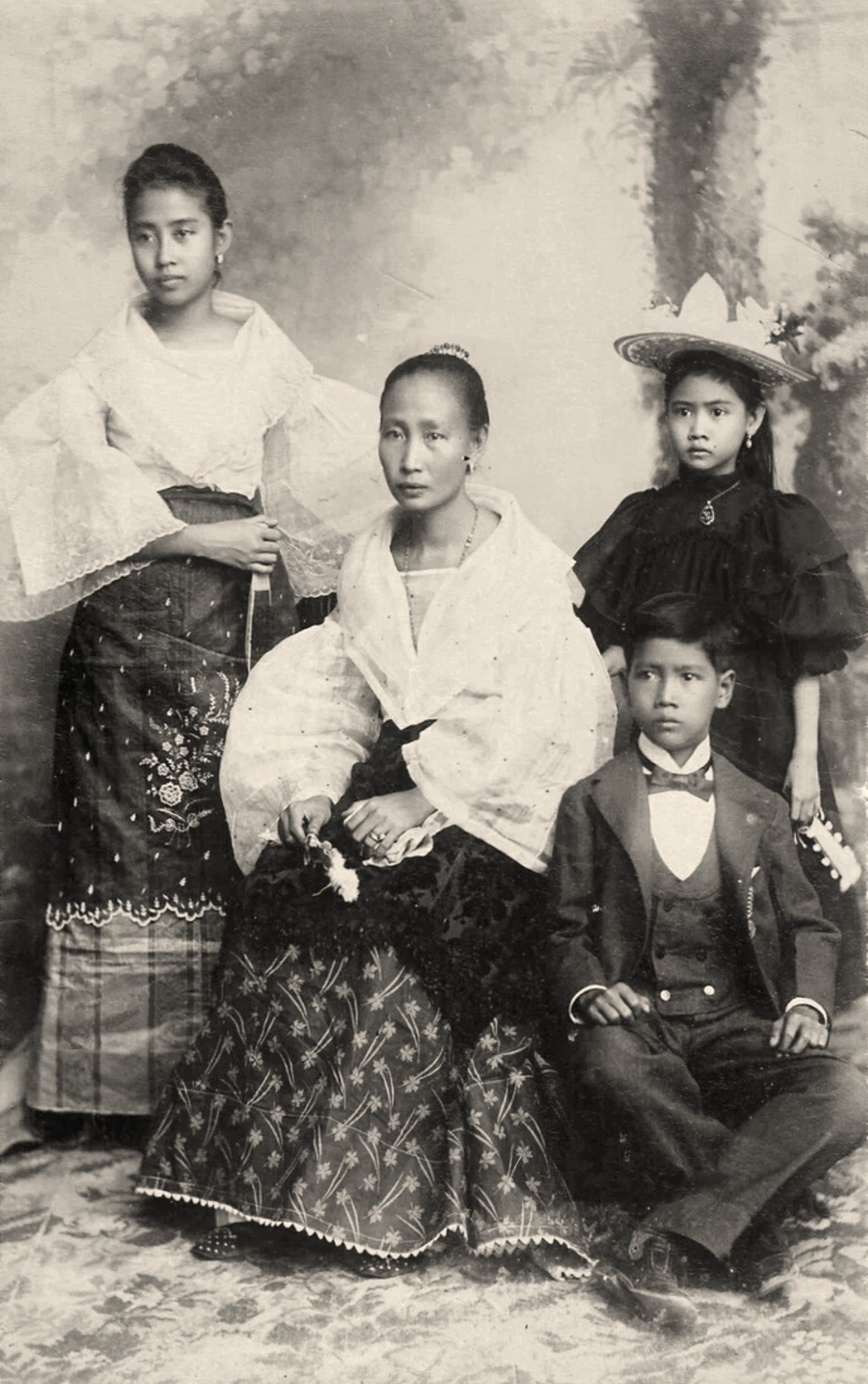
Native Filipino family (mid 1890s–early 1900s)

By the 1840s, barong mahaba largely fell out of fashion. In this period, it evolved into the modern "classic" barong tagalog, being much shorter with less ostentatious folded collars, while still retaining the sheer fabric and other baro characteristics. They were also worn with smaller hats like bowler hats (sombrero hongo) or native buntal hats. They were initially paired with looser trousers, though they gradually assumed the dimensions of modern trousers by the end of the 19th century. The colors of the barong tagalog also became more muted and monochromatic, in contrast to the colorful barong mahaba ensembles of earlier decades. Barong tagalog ensembles from the mid-19th century onwards were usually combinations of black and white, blue and white, or all-white. Baro worn by commoners also favored darker colors like brown or blue, usually paired with white silk pants.

This type of barong tagalog were common among government workers and businessmen, who usually wore them underneath jackets (chaqueta). Sheer baro were also worn by natives and mestizos for fiestas, leisure activities like dancing, or for church. However, western-style suits became more popular among students of the burgeoning ilustrado educated class.

A notable variant of the barong tagalog during this period was the baro cerrada (literally "closed baro"). Its name is derived from its closed-neck collar. It was made from opaque material (which can be white or darker colors) and was paired with white pants. This style of baro remained popular up until the early 1900s.

Indios and mestizos, regardless of class, wore barong tagalog and European-style clothing depending on what they can afford and which were fashionable at the time. The wearing of barong tagalog did have racial connotations however, since most people of unmixed European descent (the insulares, criollos, and peninsulares) retained their own dress styles and largely ignored native fashions.

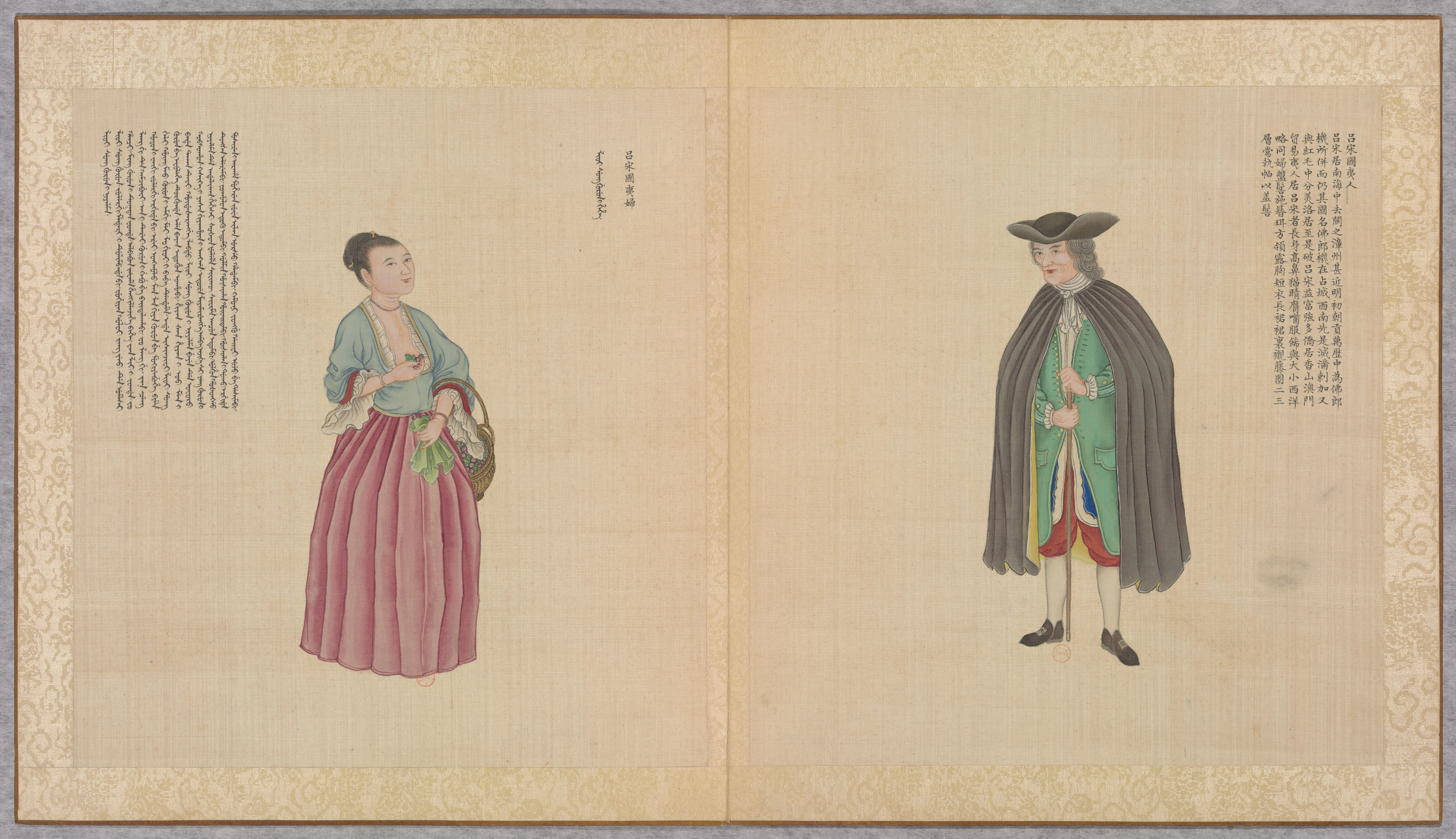
People of Luzon depicted in the Chinese book Huang Qing Zhigong Tu 1700s.

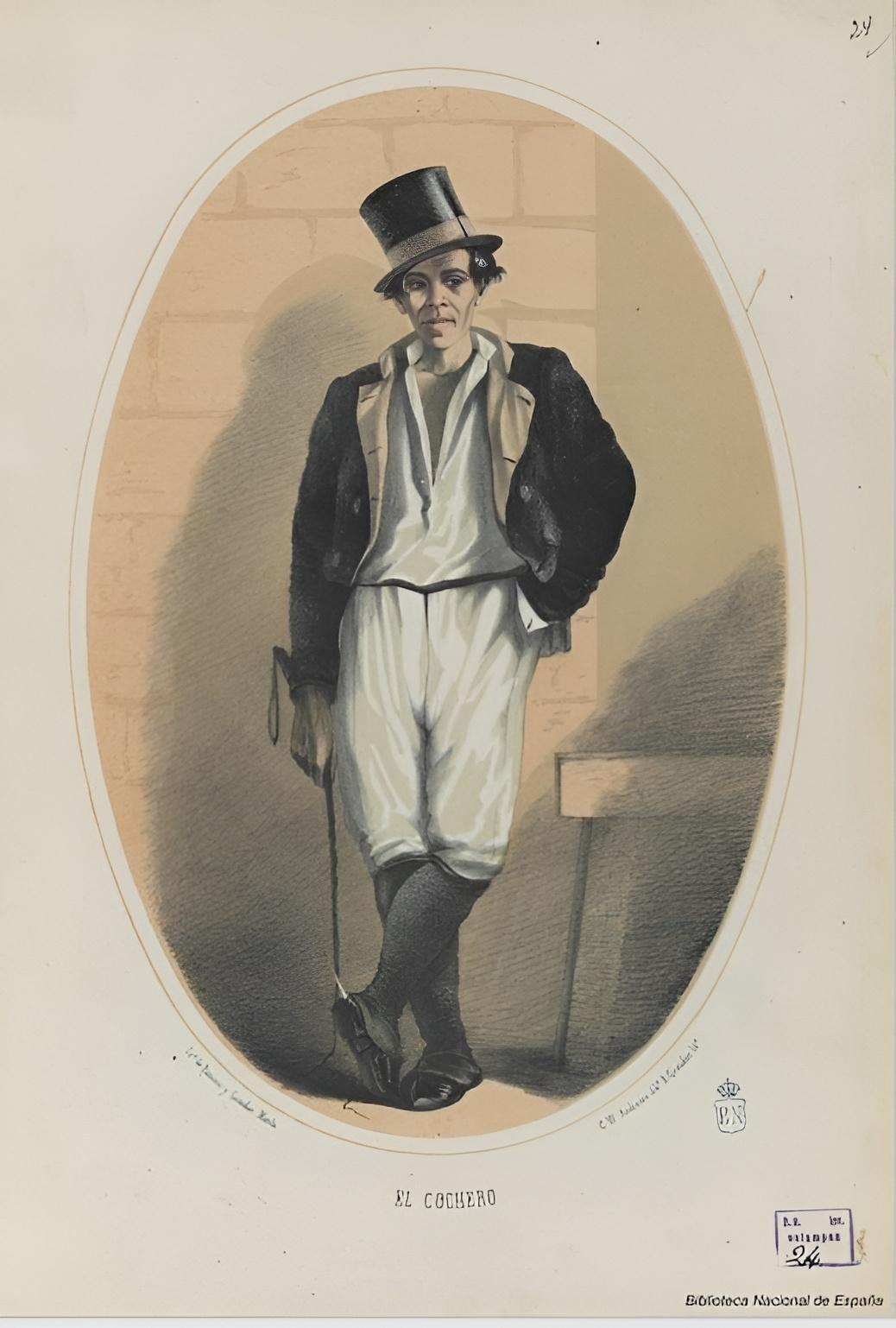
a Filipino Coachman 1800's

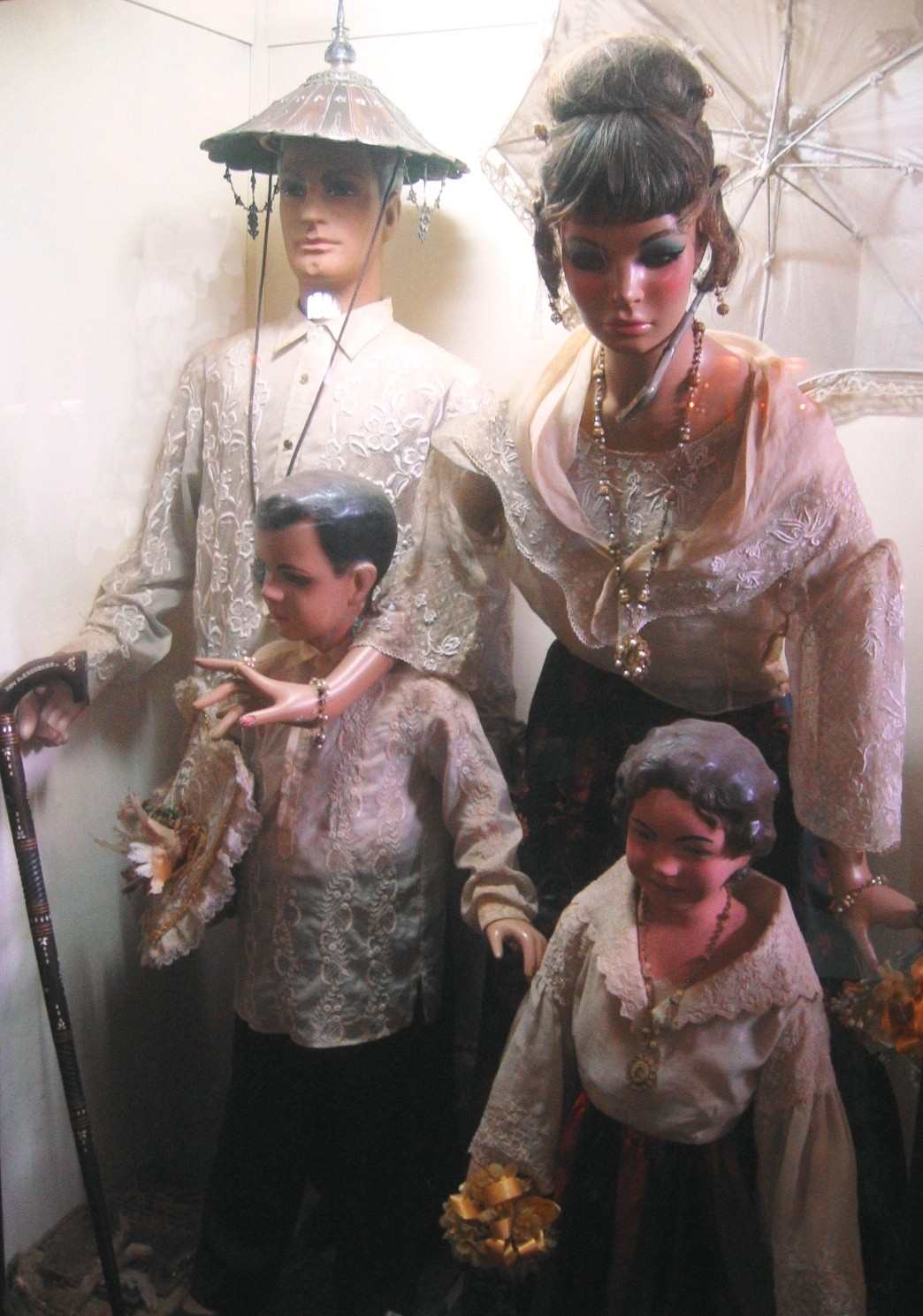
Depiction of a 19th-century family belonging in the Principalía class.

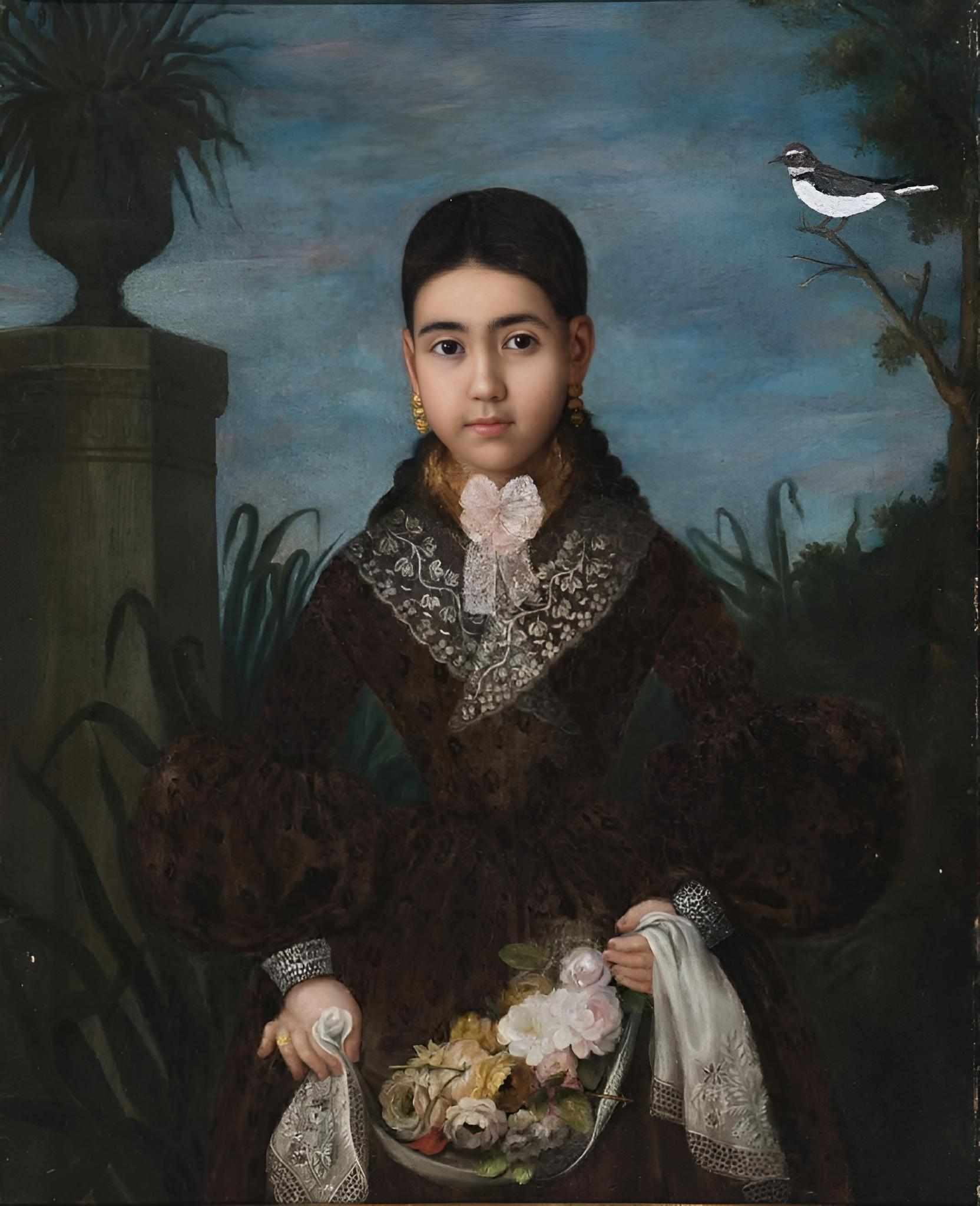
Filipina girl wearing 19th century dress, with shawl noticeably being a traditional Pañuelo.

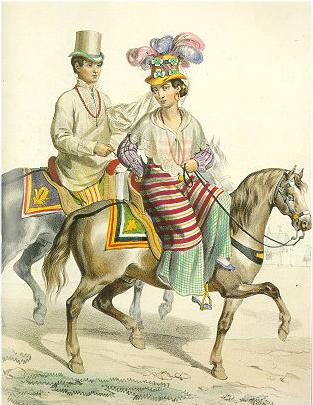
Jean Mallat de Bassilan depiction of Spanish Filipinos.

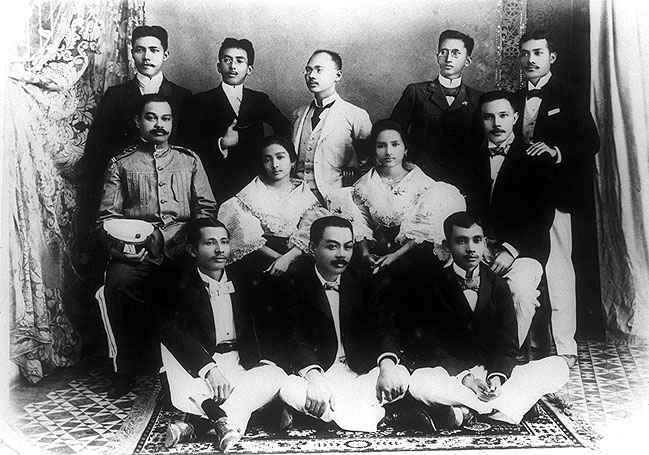
La Independencia staff.

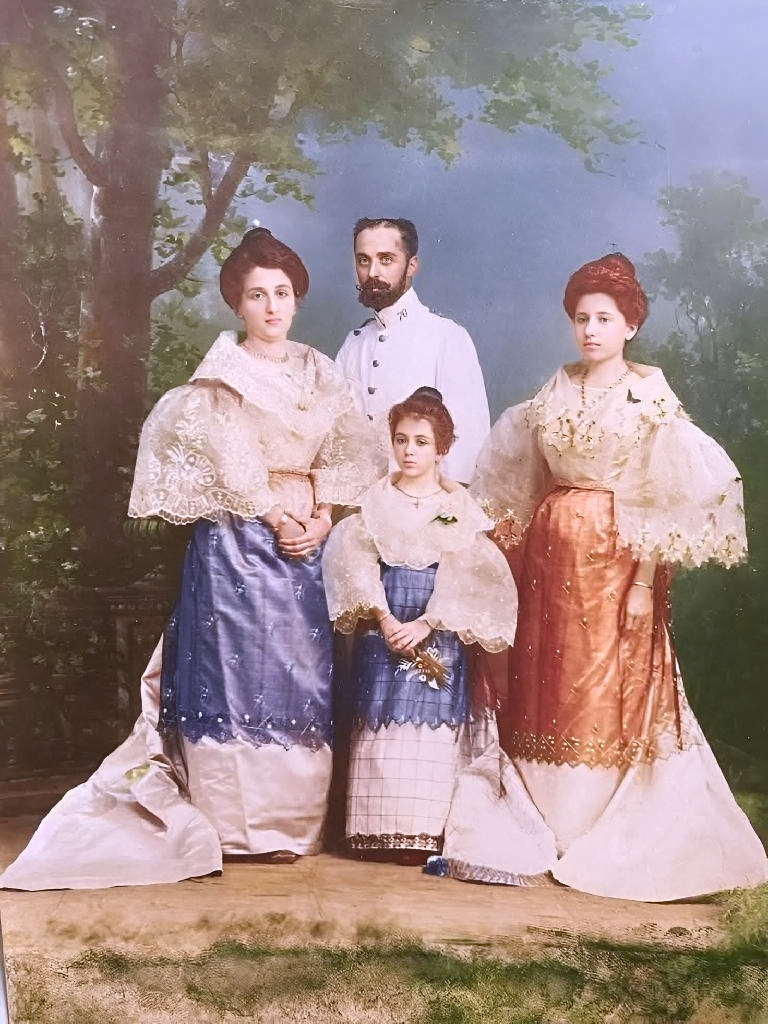
A Spanish official in the Philippines and his family (mid-late 1890s)

=== American era (1900s–1920s) ===
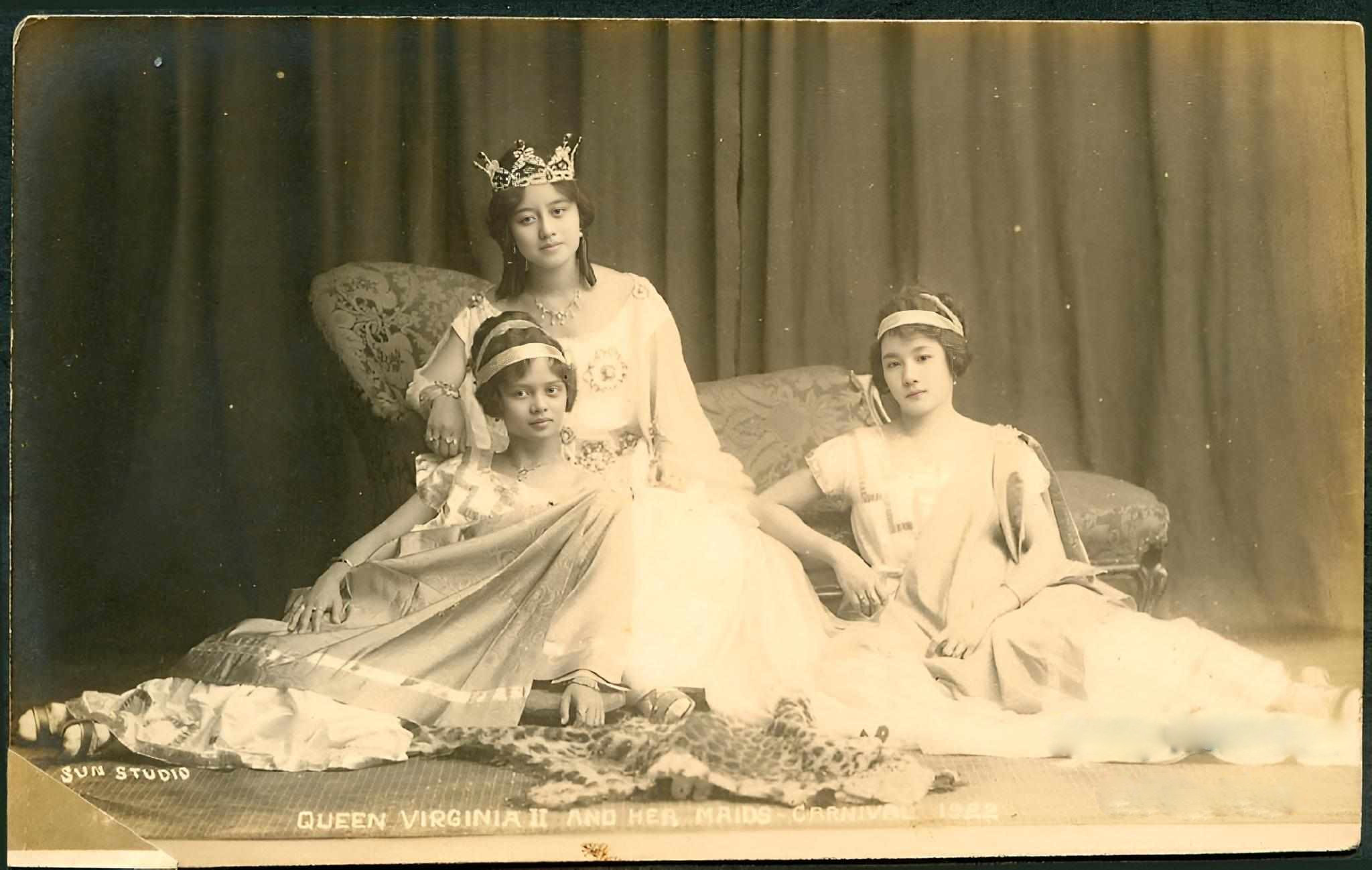
Manila Carnival of 1922

When the Americans came, the fashion remained the same for the first five years of the 20th century. But it has started to change and became more modern in contrast to the conservative style of the previous centuries as the Americans started to influence the modern Filipino culture.

The women then wore the terno, the more modern version of the traje de mestiza. It had bigger sleeves and a narrower floor length skirt with a long train called saya de cola and replaced the full wide skirt reflecting the Edwardian Fashion of the West.

By the 1920s, the style of the skirt still remained, influenced by the flapper dress; however, the wide sleeves had been flattened to butterfly sleeves (popularized by local couturier Pacita Longos), and the big pañuelo reduced its size. Such trends had gained prominence especially during the annual Manila Carnivals of the 1920s and through the 1930s. Some Filipino women who had lived in United States and in Europe wore the western 1920s fashion with loose dresses and knee length skirt. Men wore the Americana, the suit and coat worn in the West, mostly Americans (hence the name), replacing the traditional barong tagalog.

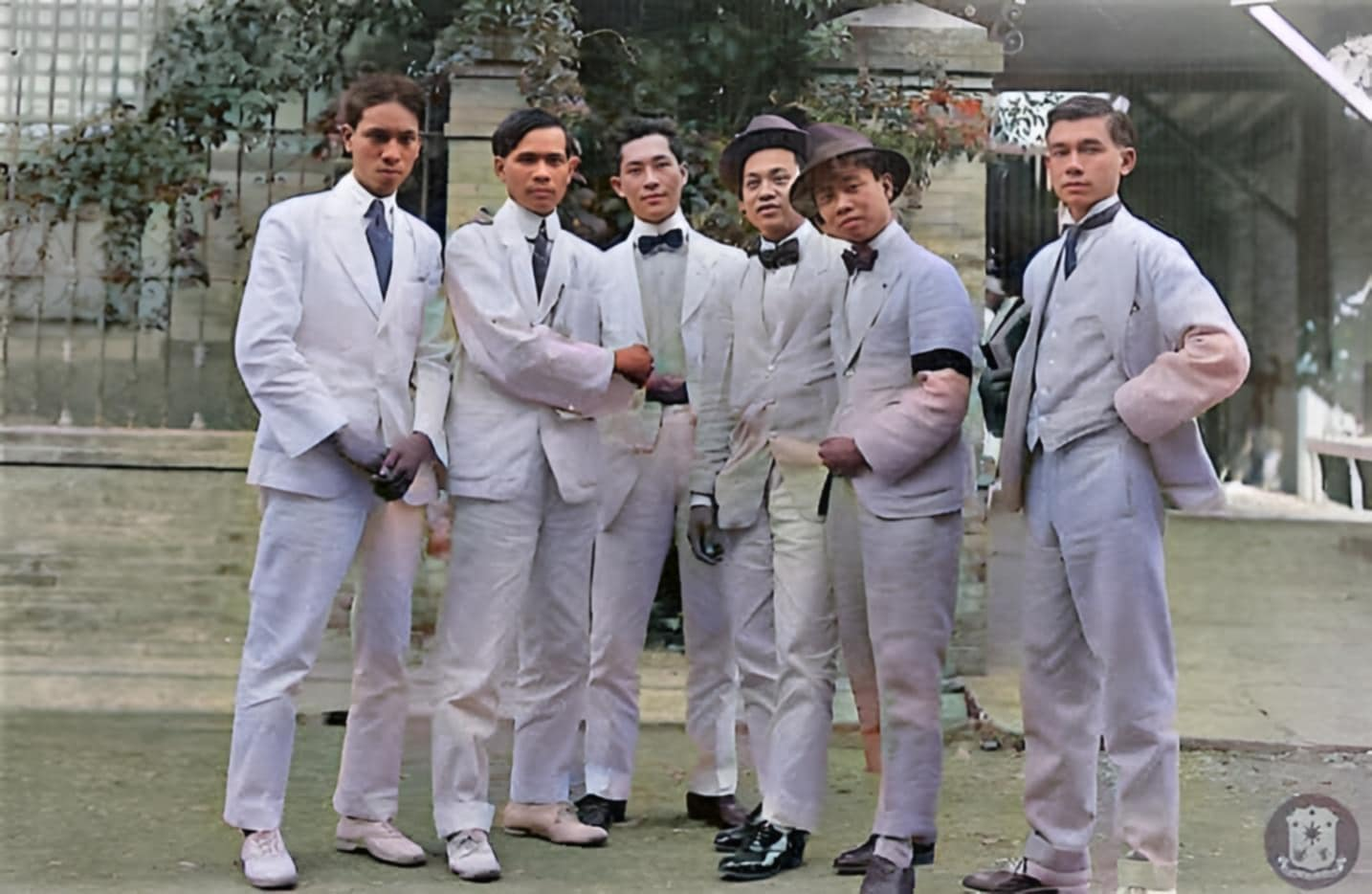
College students Manila early 20th century

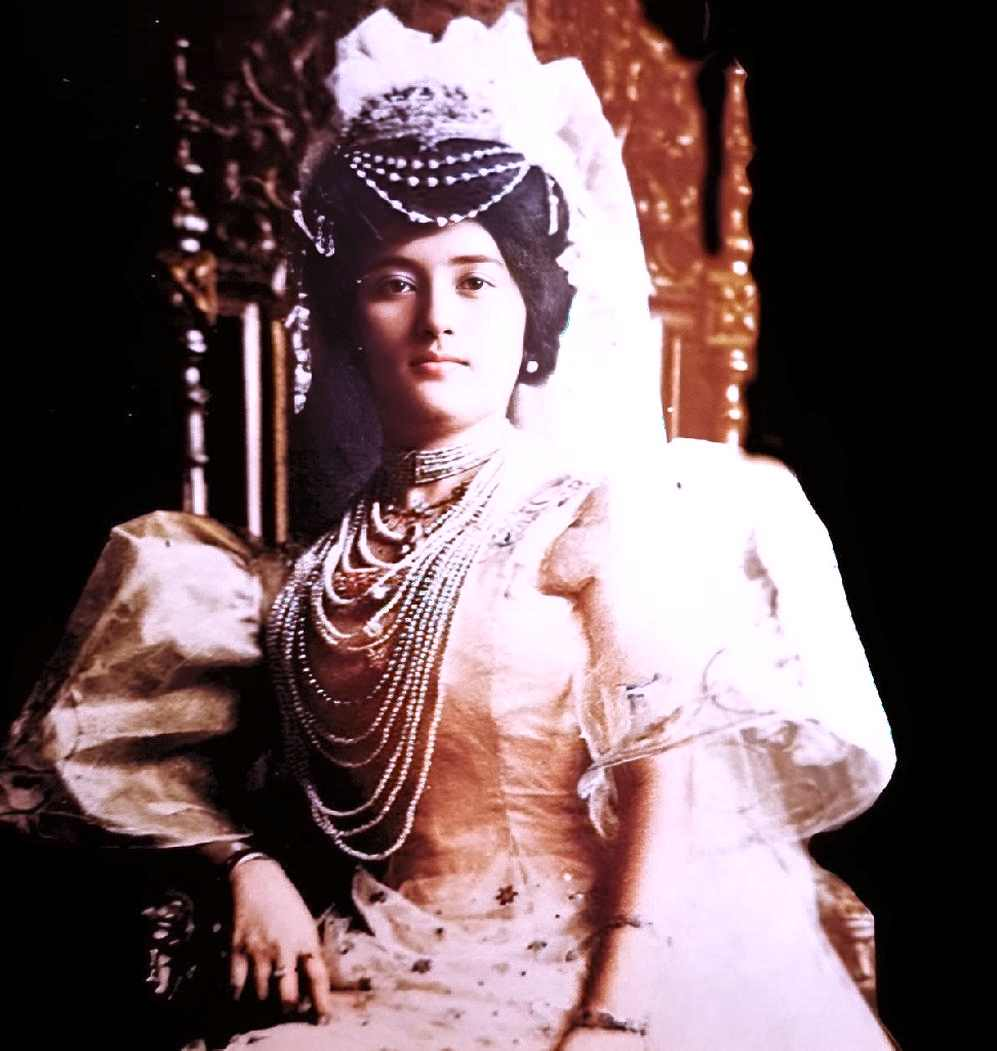
Pura Villanueva 1st Queen of the Manila Carnival. One of the most significant and legendary pageantry in the history of the country. Though it no longer exist.

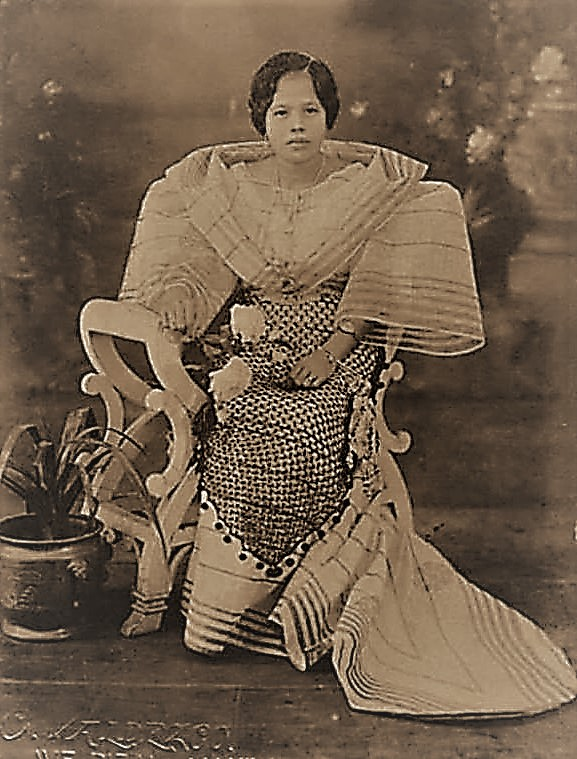
The terno from the 1910s, an American-era unified gown version of the Spanish-era baro't saya

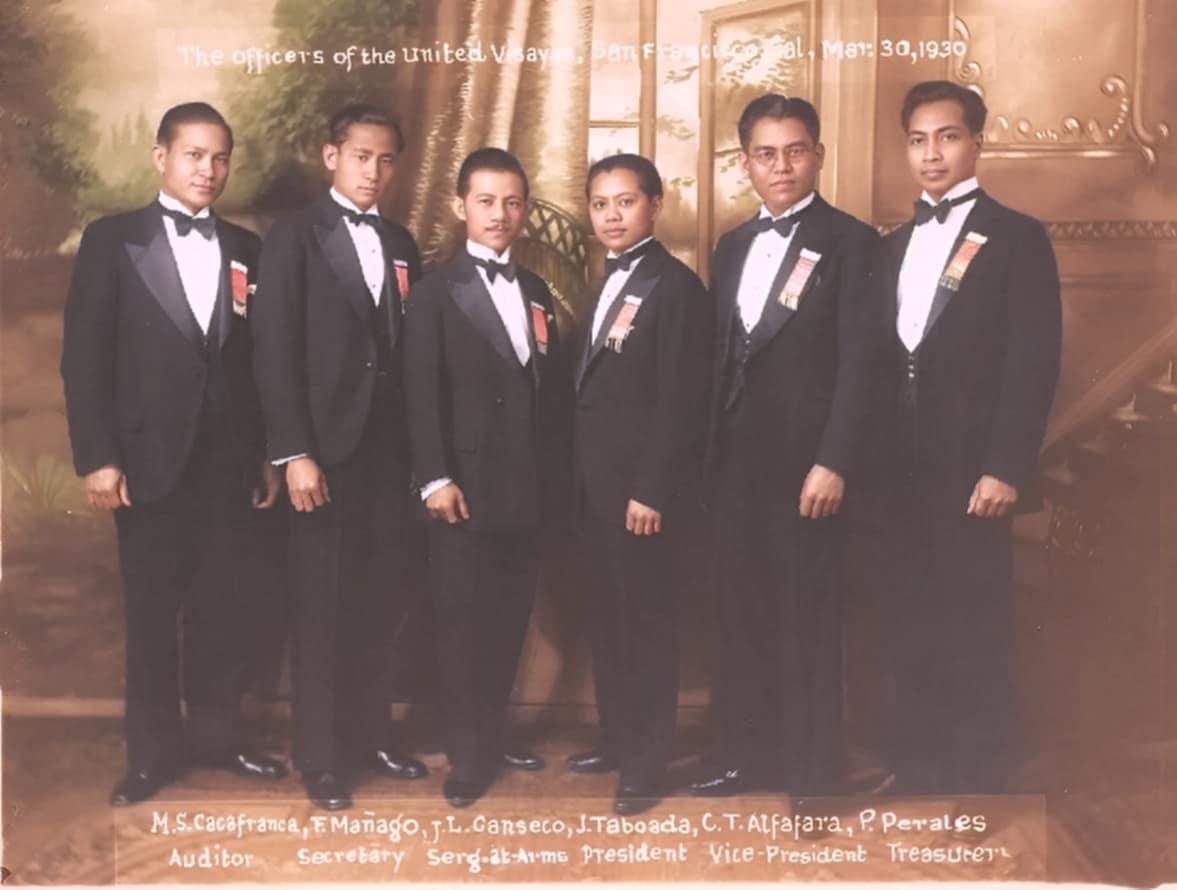
Visayan men in tuxedo, 1930s

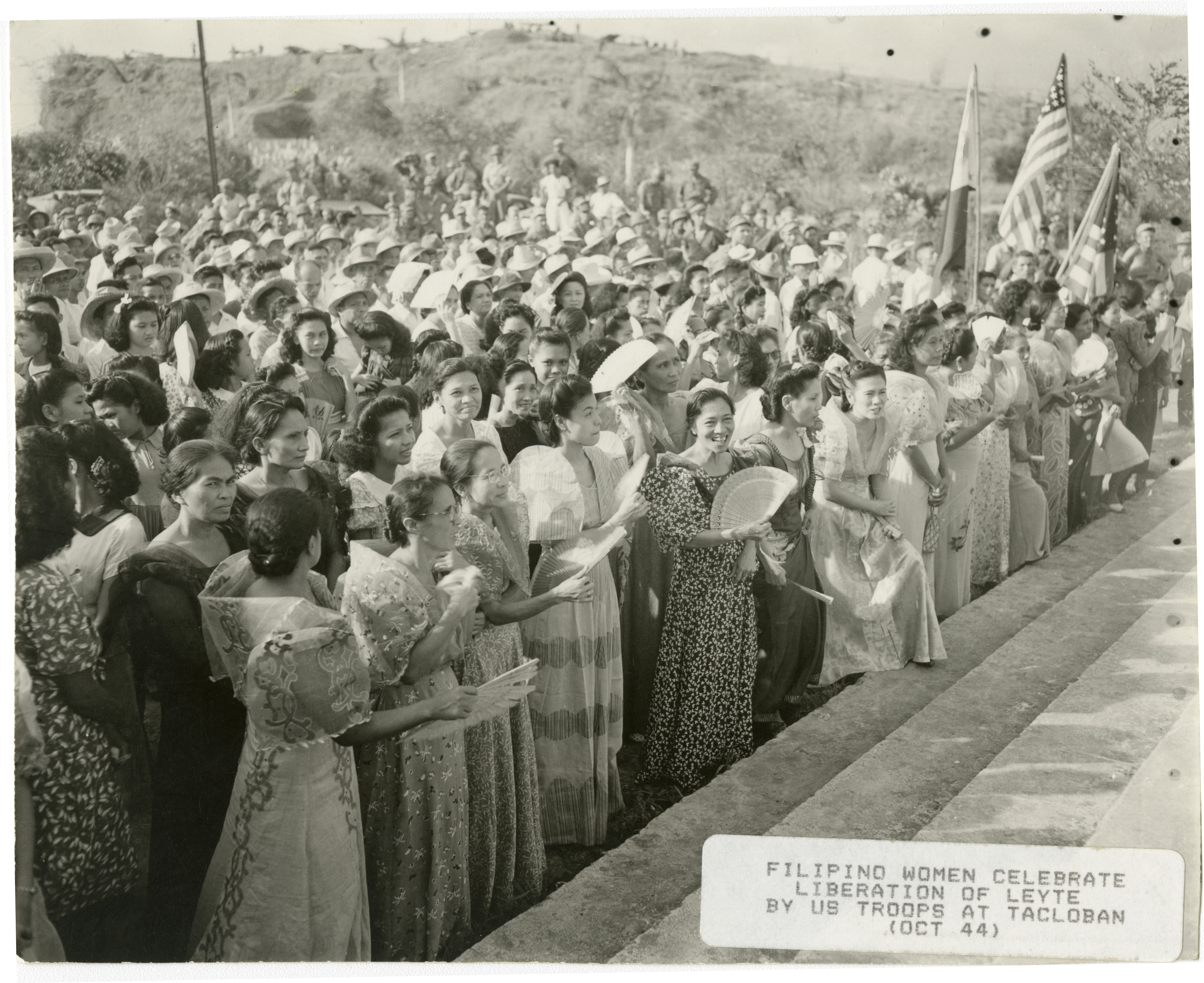
Waray people celebrating liberation from Japan

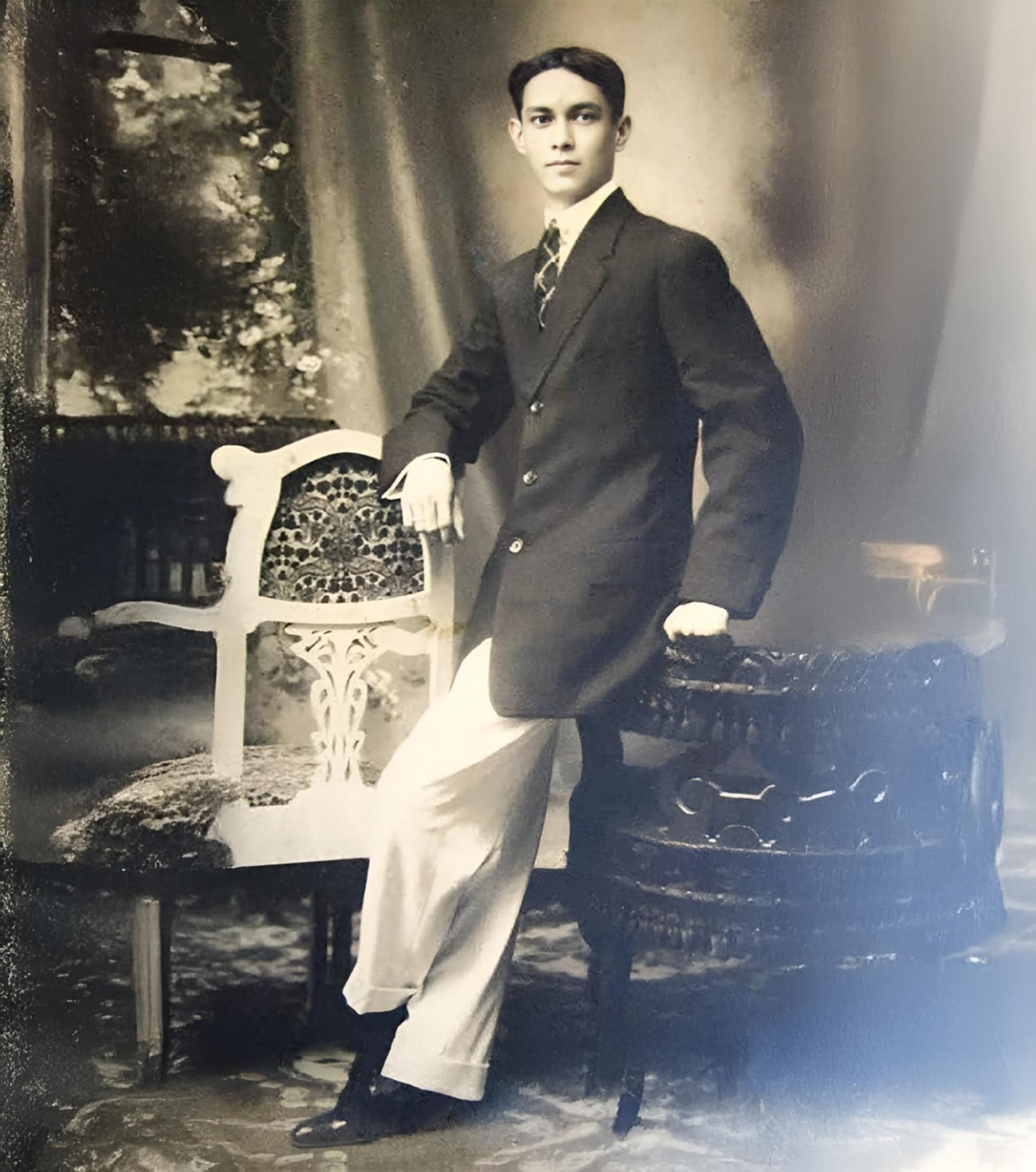
Filipino man wearing balloon pants with an oversized coat

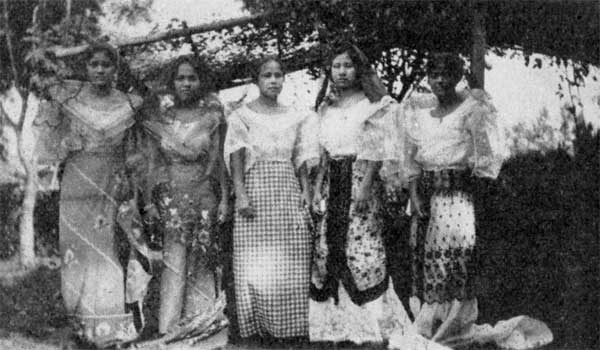
Filipino women dressed for church in 1923, variously wearing terno and baro't saya

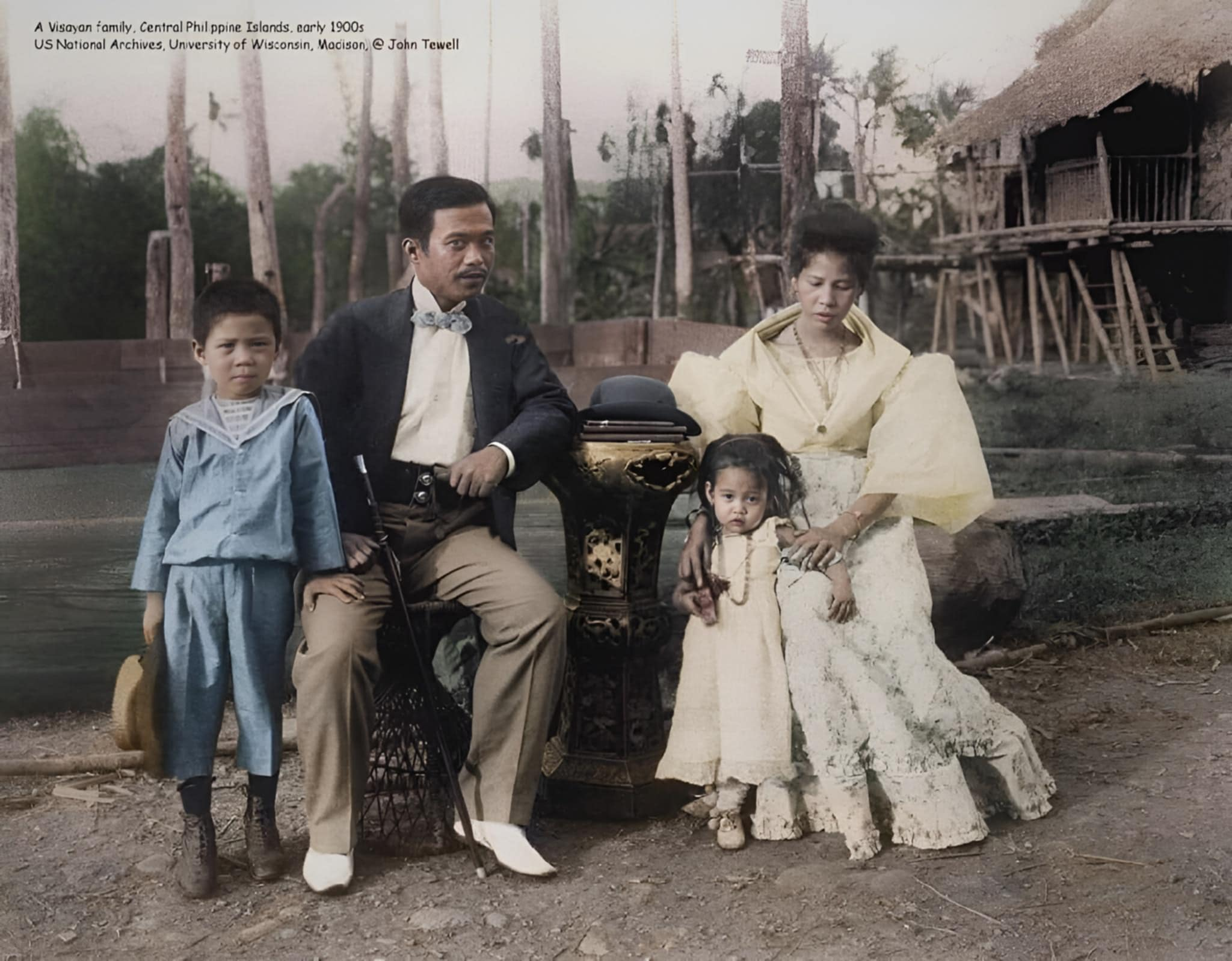
Visayan family, early 1900s

=== Commonwealth era and Second World War (1930s–1940s) ===
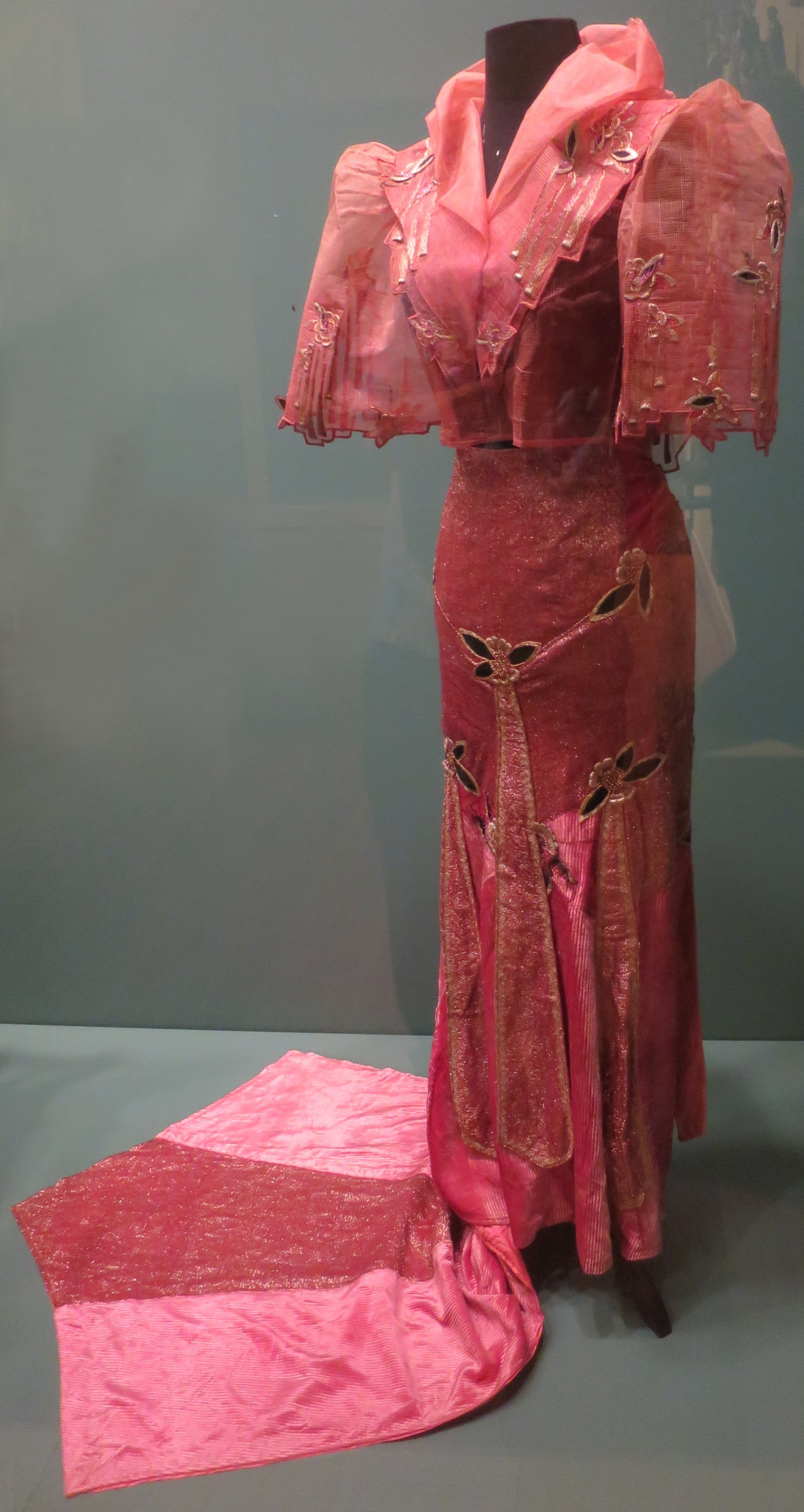
The terno ensemble rose in popularity during the 1900s. This example is from the late 1920s to the early 1930s

By the 1930s, young adult women and children finally abandoned the typical terno as everyday wear and started to wear floral printed dresses with mid-calf length shirts. Though many women embraced the western ideals, the typical terno was not fully gone. The elders and middle aged women still wore the traditional dress while the young adults considered it only as a formal dress for events such as carnivals, galas, etc.

In the 1930s, the Philippines was famous for its beauty pageants and carnivals that drew tourists from around the world, and resulted in influencing the fashion and beauty standards of the Filipino women. The women wore more elaborate and intricate dresses. The terno was still popular to the people through the 1930s. Men's fashion remained the same as they continued to wear the "Americana" suit.

When 1940s came, the Philippines saw the breaking out of World War II resulting in the shortage of tailoring shops, clothing boutiques and dressmaking factories as the country was occupied by the Japanese Empire. The austerity era started when rations were implemented and the women wore simpler clothing. The terno gradually disappeared and stopped being manufactured. Only the older people wore their old terno dresses. Clothing boutiques only sold monochromatic dresses, mostly in dark tones. The shirtwaist dresses of the previous decade also became popular in the 1940s with a simpler look.

The men's fashion still remained unchanged but became a more casual as started abandoning the coat as a casual wear, and wore it only for formal wear.

During the mid-1940s, the clothing boutiques, tailoring shops, and dressmakers stopped operation as the final chapter of the World War II occurred in the Philippines. The capital city of Manila was bombed and was left 80% destroyed, and was considered being the second most devastated capital city in World War II, next only to Warsaw.

After the war, most of the people either lost their clothes or could not find new clothes. In 1946, the country began its reparation and Manila's restoration. However, the lack of dressmakers made the fashion of the 1930s and early 1940s remain popular for the rest of the decade.

=== 1950s ===
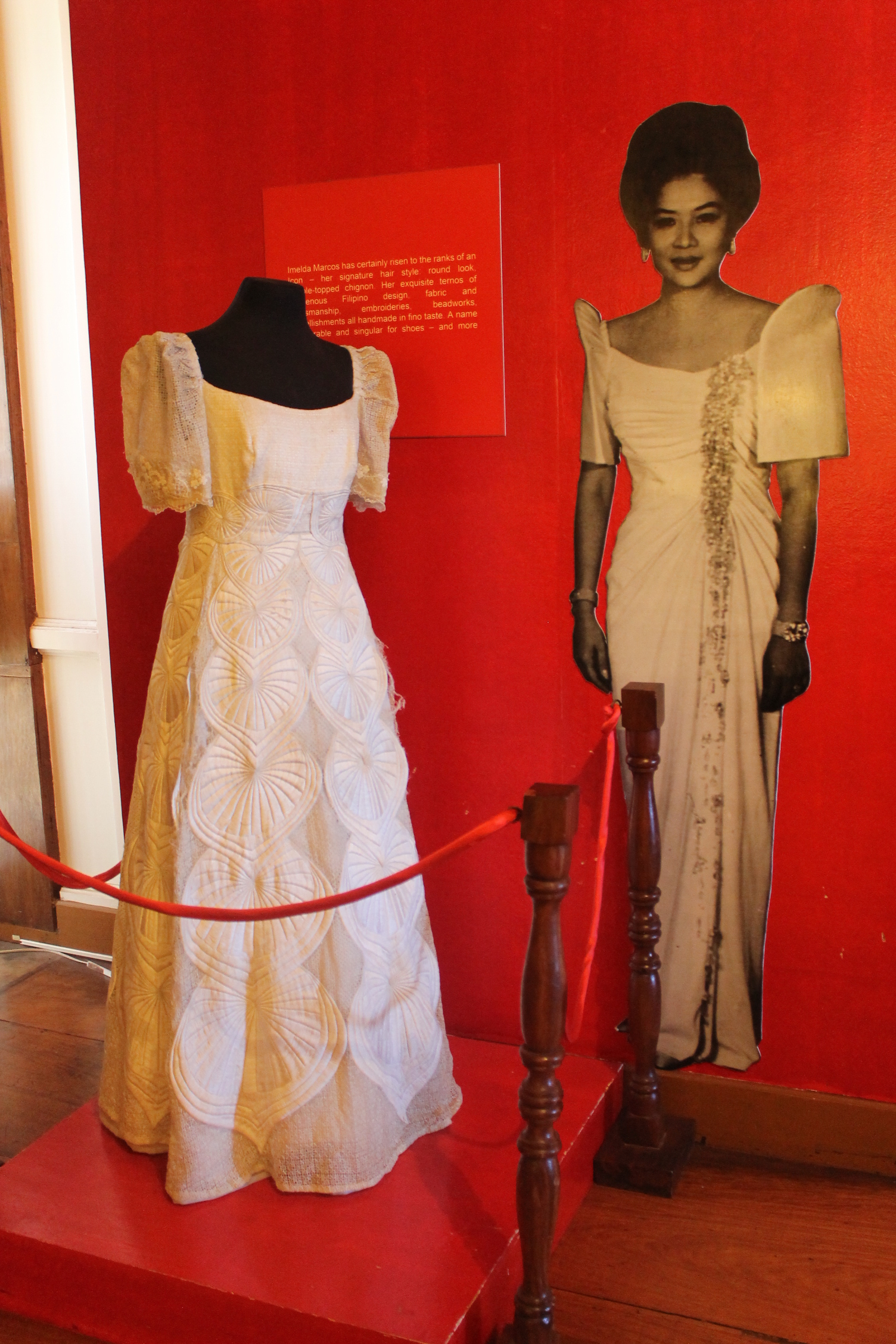
The Filipiniana/Terno gown, the modernized Traje de Mestiza rose to popularity as a formal attire during latter half of the 20th century.

When the decade started, the country saw the rise of economy, once again giving opportunities for people to have more necessities and live in the normal life. Women remained wearing the 1940s fashion during the first five years of the decade. By the late 1950s, women started to wear dresses and with floral prints and fuller knee-length skirts. The style was inspired by Christian Dior's "New Look" collection, characterized by a below-mid-calf length, full-skirt, pointed bust, small waist, and rounded shoulder line. Summer and Day dresses became popular, as well as the pencil skirts and cardigans.

Men's fashion changed slightly as the men started wearing youthful clothing such as sweaters, colorful printed polos, pants and flannels. "Chinos" became popular as well as white tee shirt, tartan plaids. The drape cut suits remained popular for formal wear.

The barong tagalog became popular again as formal wear, popularized by President Ramon Magsaysay. The terno was rarely worn by young women every day; however, it was still worn at formal events such as galas, national events, government parties and film festivals.

=== 1960s ===
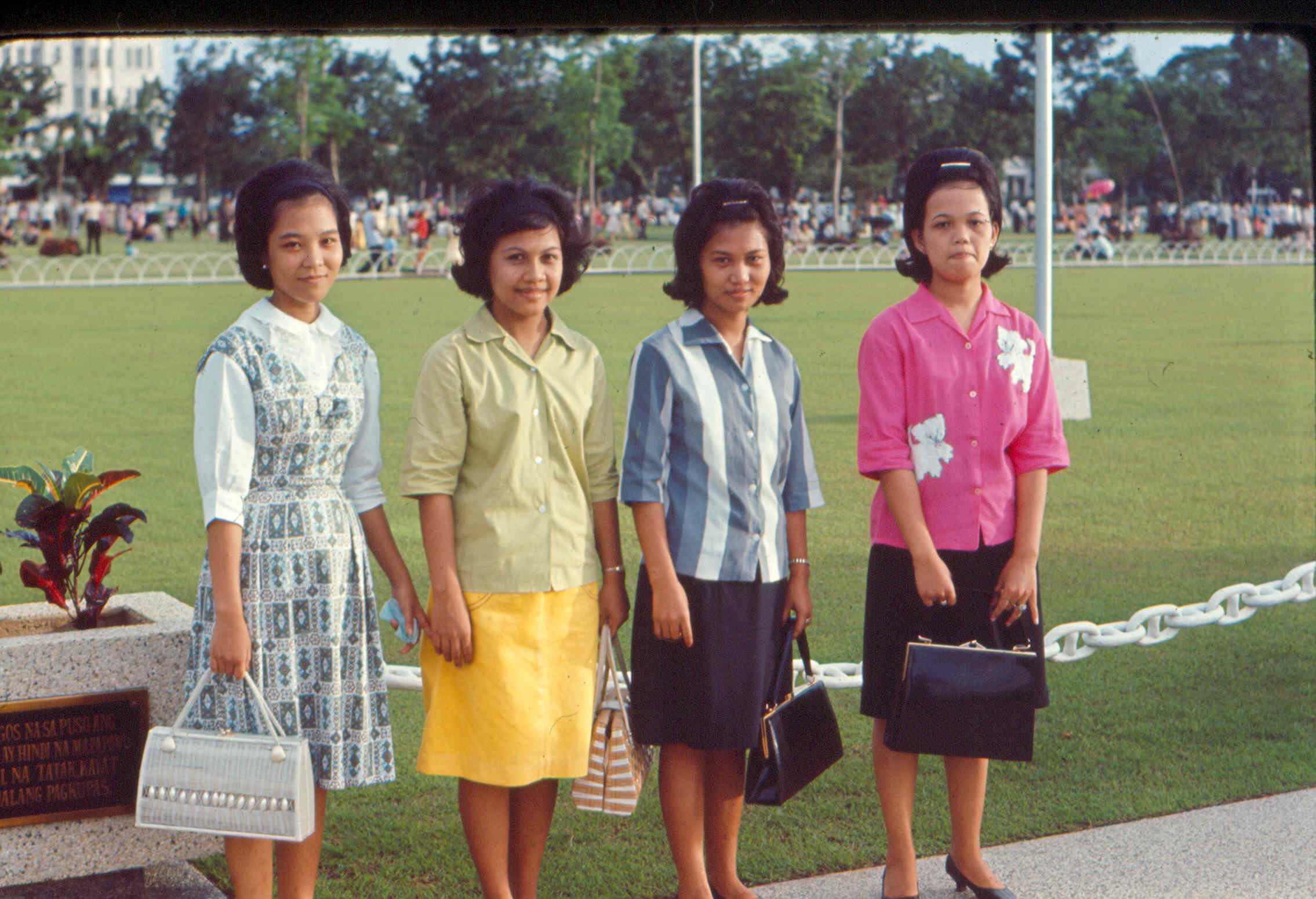
Women at the Rizal Monument, Manila, circa 1964

When the 1960s entered, most of the styles from the late 1950s still remained; however, due to the rise of British pop culture that spread in United States and other parts of the world, fashion started to change. A new kind of dress invented by Mary Quant, called the miniskirt, mini dresses started to become popular and mod style fashions also emerged. Hair became very stylish as the hair were styled bigger and higher with the use of hairspray. By the mid-1960s, the hemlines rose and the clothes loosened, influenced by the mod culture.

Men's fashion shifted towards a more youthful vibe, influenced by the rising Teenage culture seen in Hollywood and by various Teen-oriented Filipino films where they started wearing polos and pants, replacing the suit and coats. Suits and coats, as well as the barong tagalog, were now only worn during events and by the older men.

=== 1970s ===
With the popularity of the hippie culture in the late 1960s, many Filipinos embraced this culture which has continued until the early seventies. At the same time, the rise of Filipino Nationalism began and both movements influenced the way people lived and dressed. The early 1970s saw women start to abandon mini-dresses for a more modest clothing such as maxi skirts. Vintage clothing from the Victorian era of the west also became popular as long sleeves, laces, and collars became popular in dresses. Bell bottom pants started to become popular that would continue to the rest of the decade. Men also started to grow their hair long, the first time ever that such style became acceptable in post-colonial Filipino society.

Men also wore bell-bottoms often in bright colors, similar to the women. The turtle neck became popular as well as sweater vests, colorful bright patterned polos and pants.

By the mid-1970s, men started wearing t-shirts, which replaced the formal look with a more laid-back look. Denim jeans also started to emerge, as well as sweatshirts.

When the disco culture emerged, the bell bottoms became a staple. It came up with different bright colors, as well as the polos and scarfs. Women started wearing sequined dresses, mostly in miniskirts and bell bottom jeans. T-shirts also became popular for women and the footwear called bakya became popular.

=== 1980s ===
Following the 1986 EDSA Revolution, Corazon Aquino favored western style power dressing and the simpler and more modest kimona in place of the terno.

Due to the power dressing movement, women, usually young adults, also started to wear clothes with shoulder pads while teenagers started wearing neon colored clothes. Miniskirts also came back in popularity. Hairstyles were also emphasized as most women had their hair curled.

Men's fashion had a shift as they started to wear brightly colored t-shirts or polo shirts and denim jeans for a casual look, throwing away the more formal look. Teenage boys also wore pastel and neon colored jackets, polos, pants, short shorts and t-shirts. Converse All-Stars shoes were also popular among the teenagers.

Colorful short shorts for both teen boys and girls were also one of the huge trends that defined the decade.

Sportswear also became popular for everyday clothing. Leggings rose to popularity as well as jogging pants, headbands and legwarmers.

By 1989, a drastic change in style emerged; a trend having oversized shirts and pants were in style, paving way to the 1990s loose fashion.

=== 1990s ===
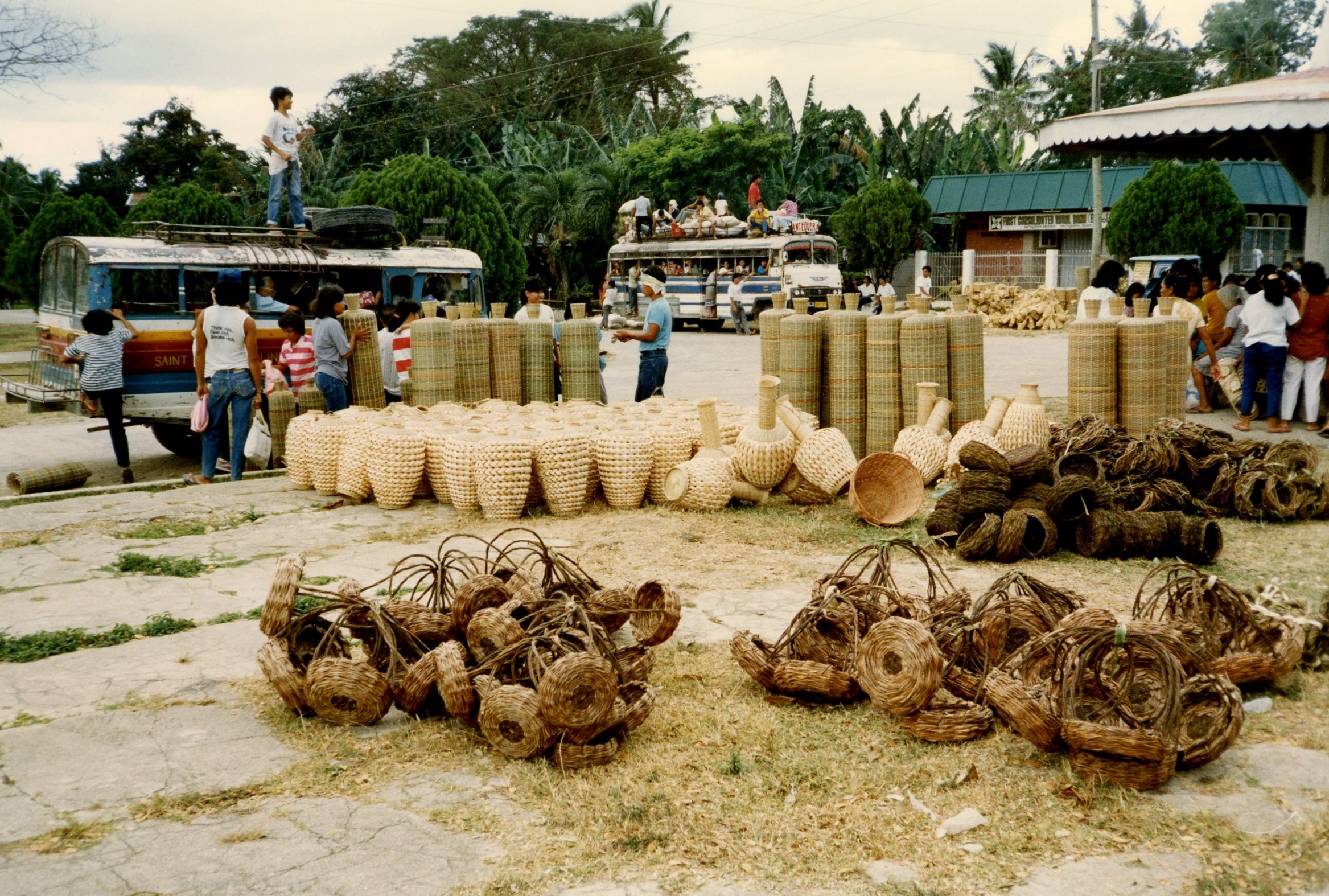
Rural scene in Antequera, Bohol in 1990

Fashion in the 1990s was a laid back version of the 1980s fashion. This decade saw the beginning of the influence of grunge and rap music to mainstream fashion. Despite being impractical for tropical weather, but also taking advantage on the increase of affordable air conditioners, men started to wear dark, simple and mostly oversized clothes, moving away from the brightly colored clothes of the 1980s. Women also wore loose, simple and casual clothing such as oversized shirts, denim shorts, denim jeans, simple blouses and sneakers. Skirts weren't as popular as denim throughout the decade.

Men's hairstyles also changed as they grew their hair longer for the first time since the decade of the 1970s. Also, a hairstyle called cachupoy was considered popular among teenage boys. It was a straight hairstyle that has a middle parting at the center, most teen celebrities sported this kind of hairstyle.

It was also the decade when people from all social classes wore the same style of clothes, with people having a hard time distinguishing who was from the upper class or from the lower class as everyone opted for a simple, laid-back style of dressing.

=== 2000s ===
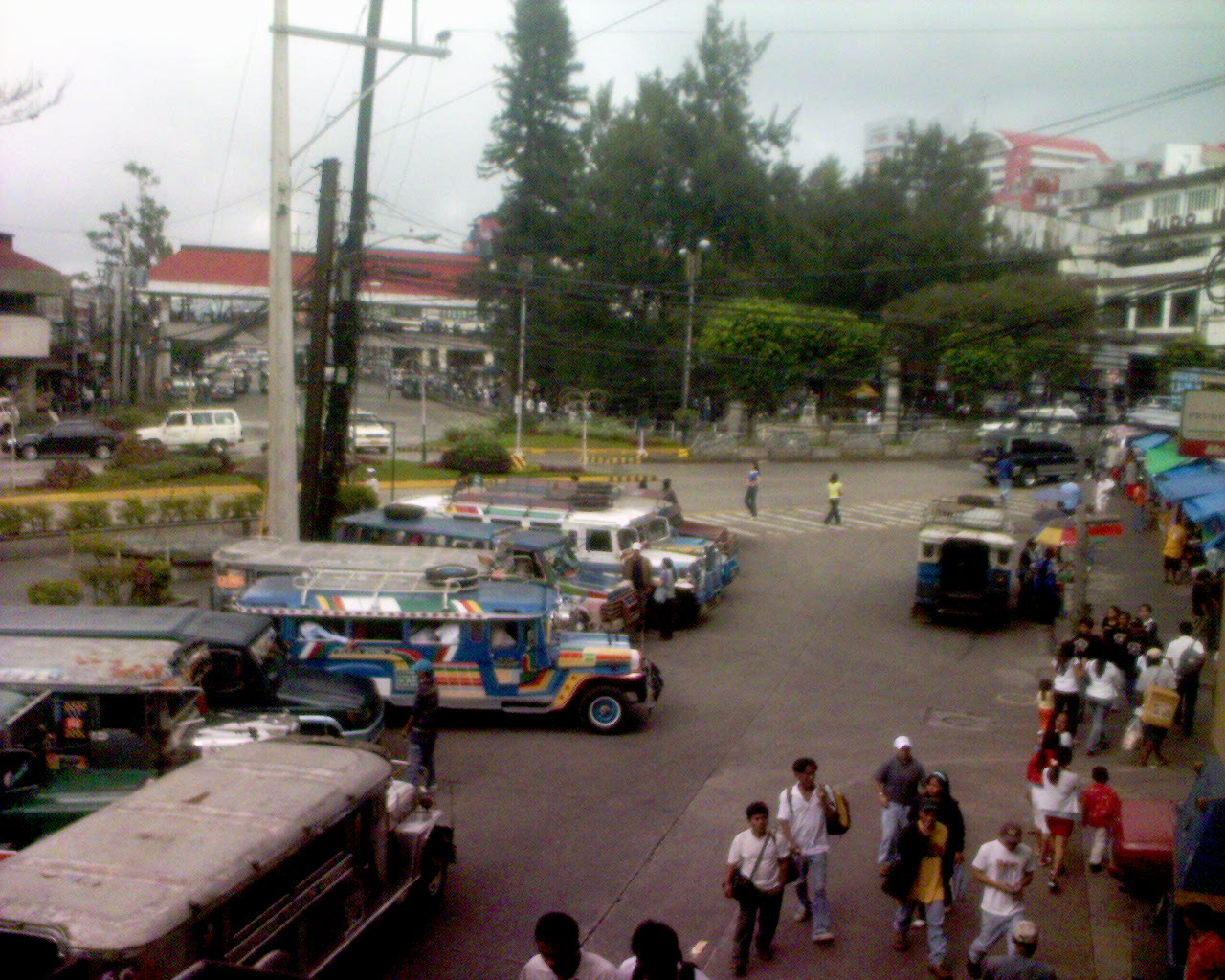
Scene in Session Road–Magsaysay Avenue intersection in Baguio, c. 2005

1990s fashion remained popular during the early years of the first decade of the 21st century. 2000s fashion was considered a mash up of different styles. In the first part of the decade, the concept of innerwear as an outerwear was popularized resulting in the popularity of spaghetti strap clothes. Men still followed the 1990s fashion with hip-hop inspired of clothing, wearing cargo pants and oversized T-shirts.

By the mid-2000s, colorful clothes began to rise again. Men started wearing flannel and checkered polos. At the end of the decade, people saw the mixture of clothing from ugg boots worn with short shorts and t-shirts to dresses worn over with leggings. It was characterized by bright colors, textures, patterns and a bunch of accessories.

In the late 2000s and early 2010s, Jejemon style clothing consisting of oversized shirts with large prints and high crown hats became popular with teenagers.

=== 2010s ===
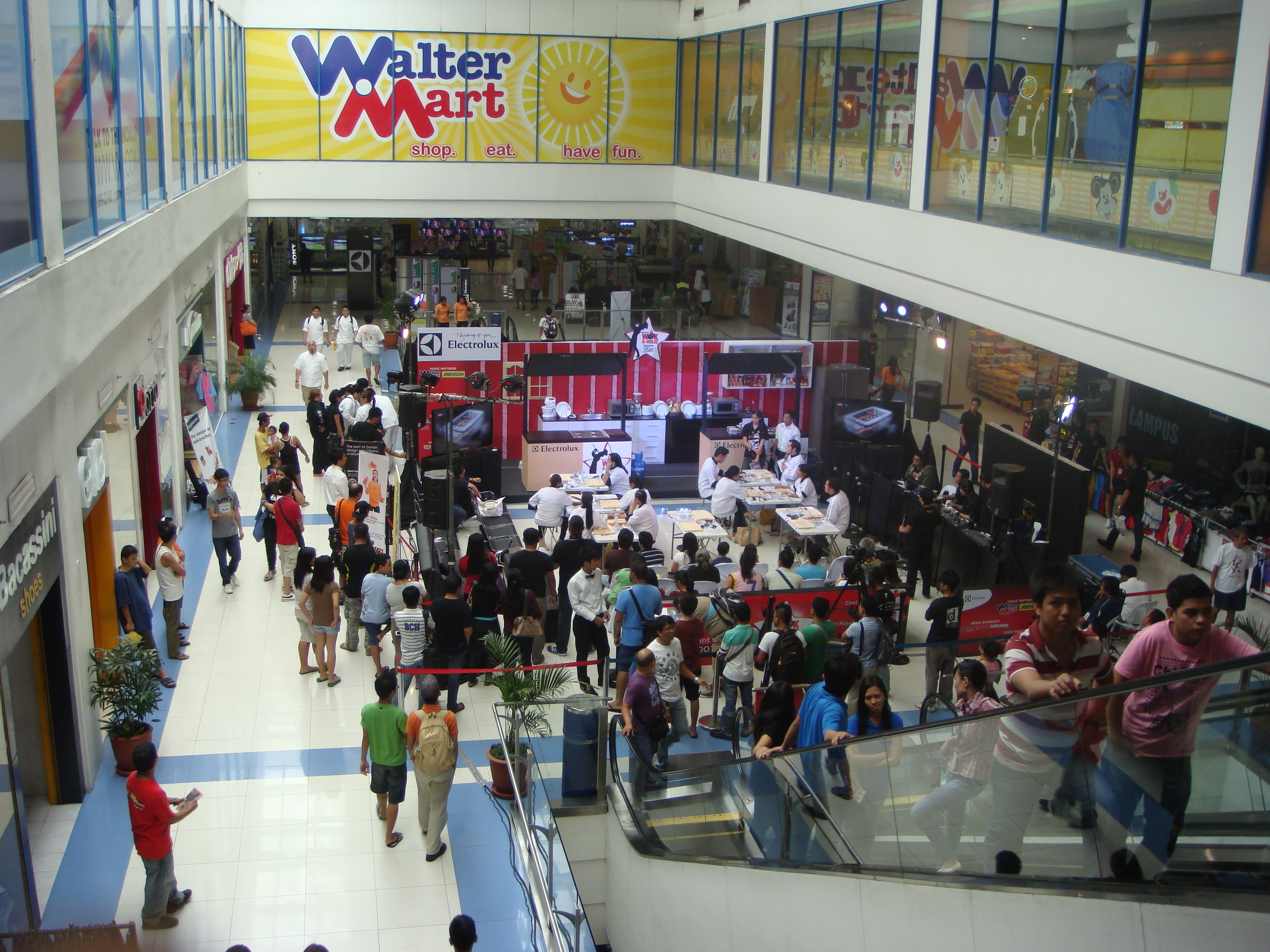
Scene in Waltermart Munoz, Quezon City in 2012

Due to the development of social media, many Filipino women and men were exposed to different styles. Also due to the rising economy of the country for the first time since the 1986 People Power Revolution, as well as the constant building of shopping malls and shopping centers, many Filipinos began buying more clothes.

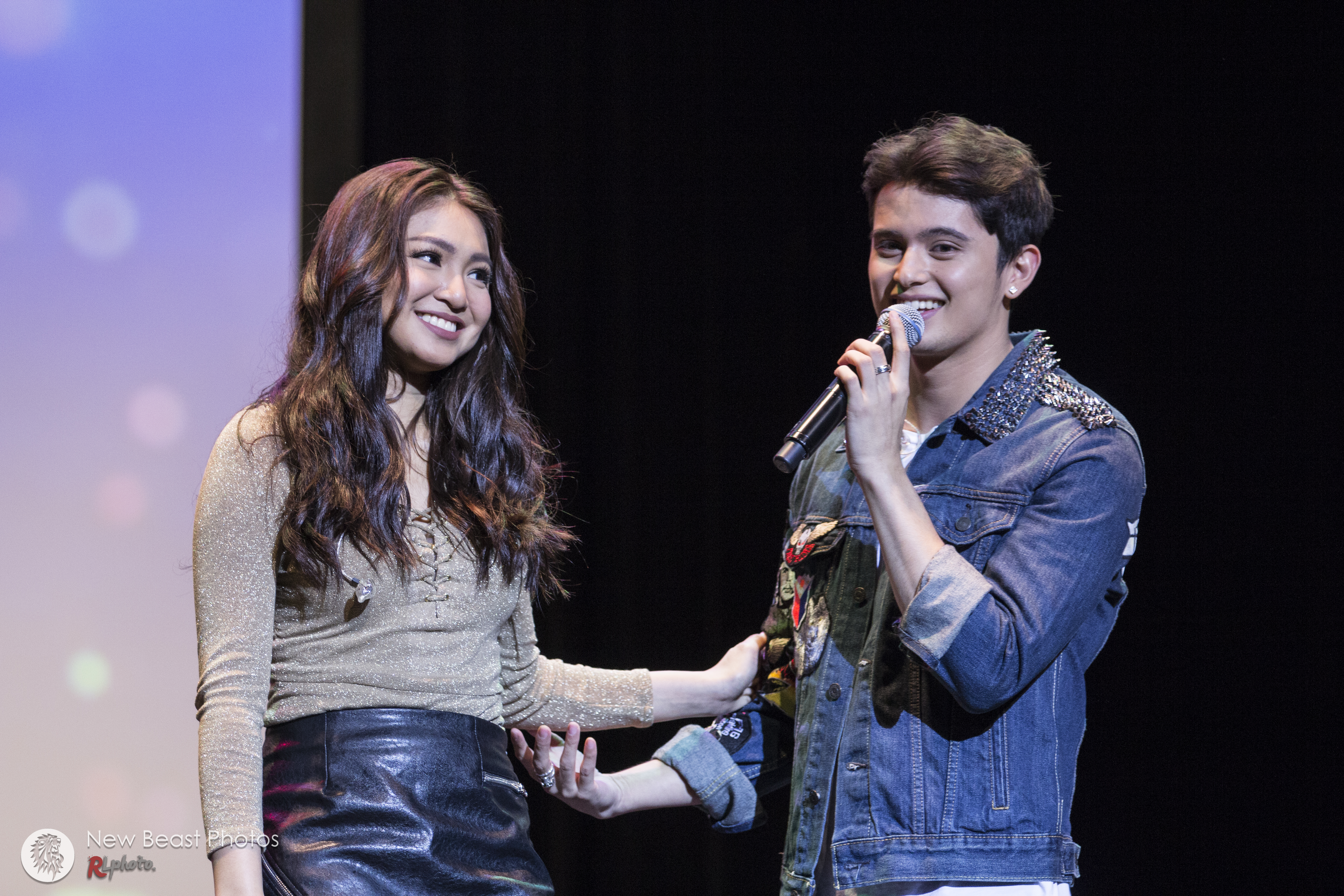
James and Nadine

The early 2010s began with a continuation of some of the late-2000s fashion; however; in 2011, a change began as people started to move away from the rock influenced 2000s fashion and create a more distinctive 2010s fashion. With the rise of social media, most of the women began wearing inspired clothes. Also, women became interested in 1960s fashion and began replicating that style. Men also began wearing preppy clothes inspired by the British boy band One Direction who rose to fame in 2010. Skinny jeans and shorts proved to be popular among the men and these came up in different colors.

In 2013, skater skirts became popular among teenage girls and they started wearing more feminine clothing.

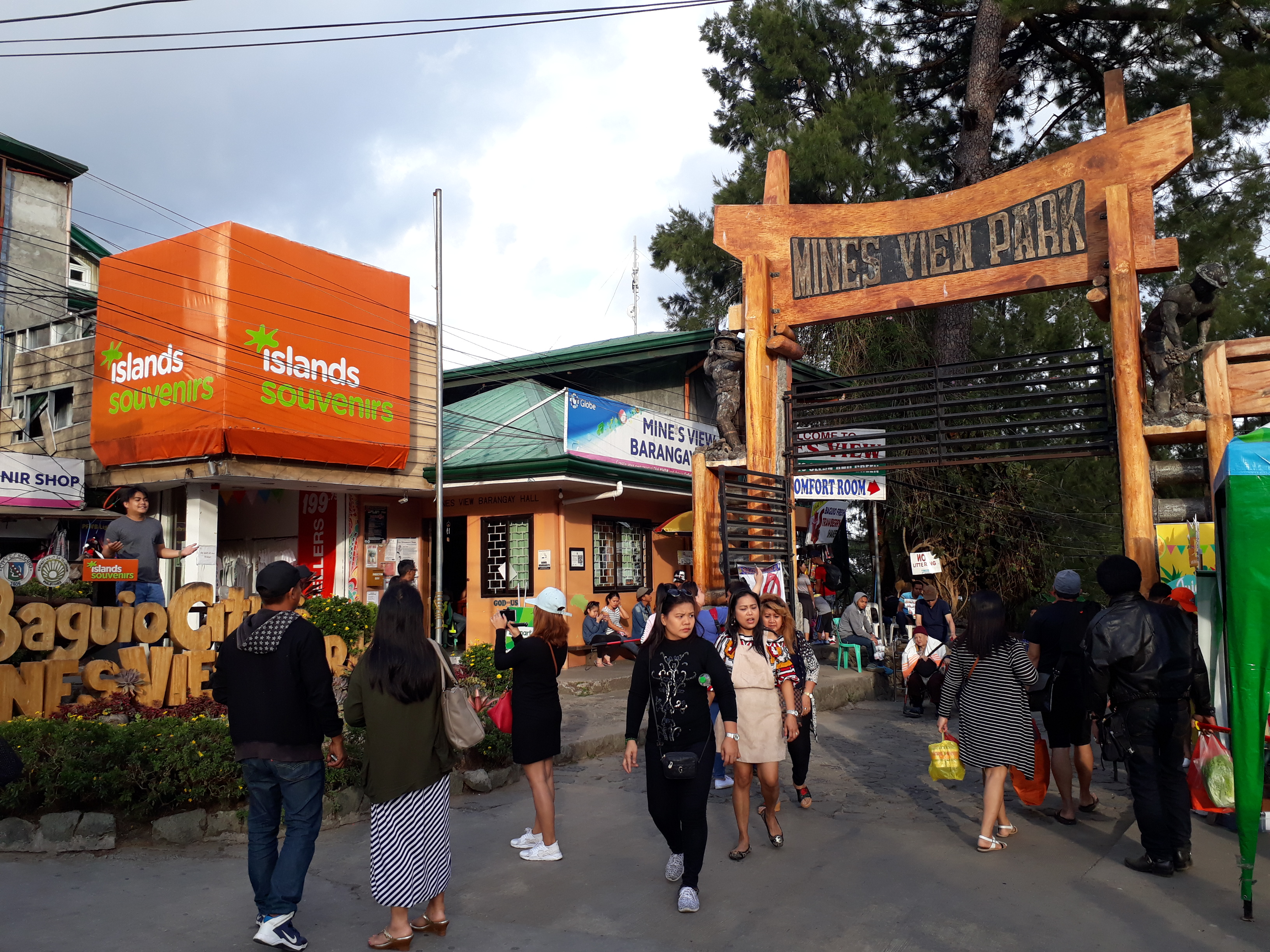
Tourists at Mines View Park, Baguio in 2018

When the mid-2010s entered, women began wearing more modest clothing as the fashion brands started to market 1950s and 1960s inspired clothing. Denim pants was replaced by skirts and leggings. Men began to wear more formal clothes.

Dresses replaced the casual t-shirts and jeans worn by the women while Chinos replaced the denim pants worn by men.

By the mid-2010s, many of the fashions from the mid-1960s and mid-1990s returned, clothing such as midi-skirts, denim jackets, knitted sweaters, boat shoes, etc. came back into fashion while fashion pieces like chokers gained prominence once again. Men's fashion also started to move away to the rock/hiphop-influenced styles of the past two decades and started to define a new style for men. 2010s hairstyles were often defined by; loose waves for women and slick-back hair for men. While beauty trends include having emphasis on the lips, and contoured cheeks, nude color palettes were also prominent for make-up.

The late 2010s saw Mindanao-influenced designs, and a resurgence of interest for ternos and their redesigns for modern applications, with 2018 hosting the first TERNOCON.

=== 2020s ===
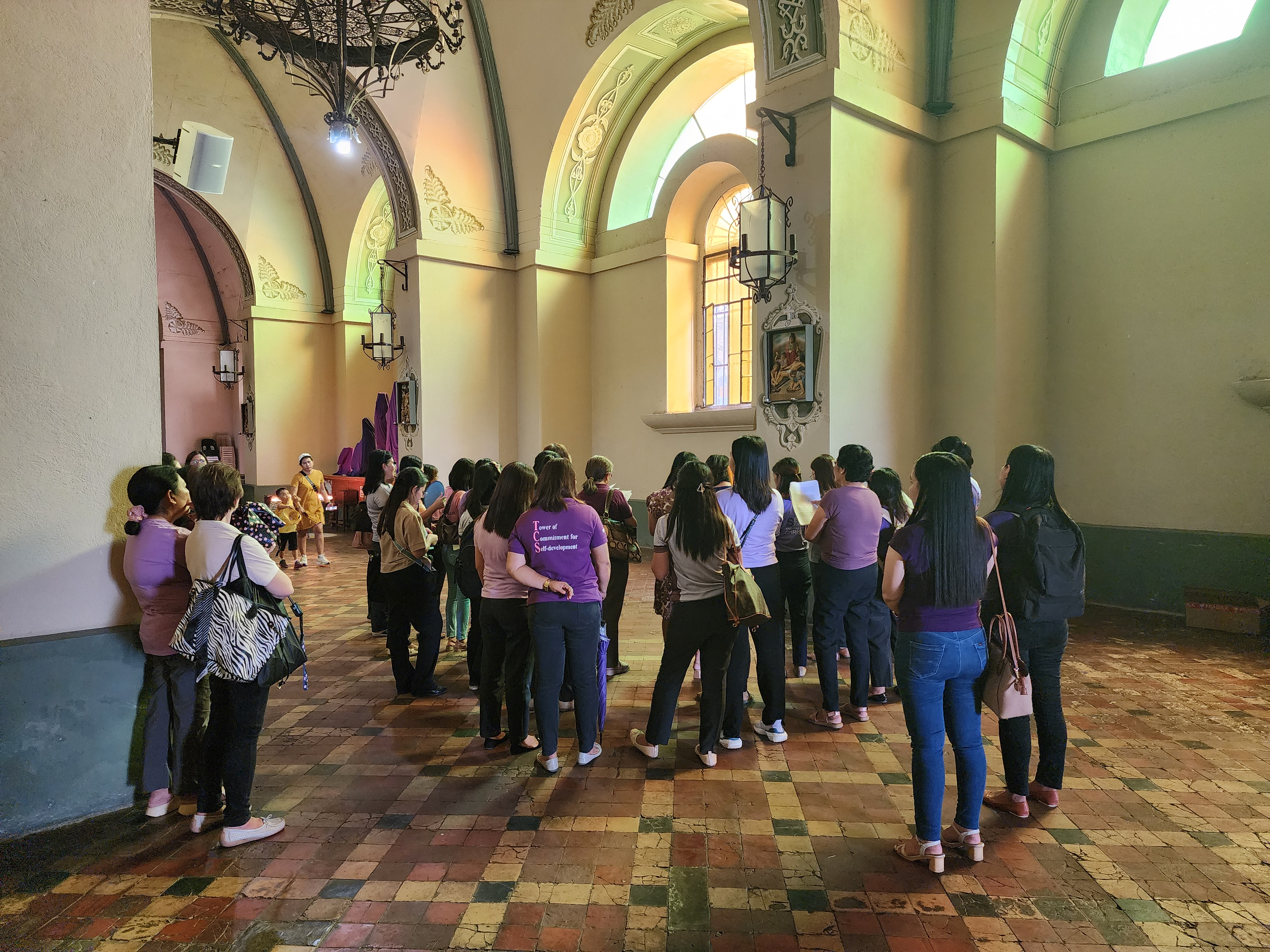
Catholic devotees during Holy Wednesday Visita Iglesia in Taal Basilica in 2024

Filipino fashion in the 2020s has been characterized by a blend of modern and traditional elements, with a strong emphasis on comfort, sustainability, and cultural expression. Key trends include modernized Filipino heritage fashion, athleisure, and Y2K revival. The COVID-19 pandemic also significantly impacted fashion, with face masks becoming more common. The year also saw a wave of trends, including the return of shoulder bags highlighted by Louis Vuitton's mini pochettes and Prada's re-additions pieces. Loose frock dresses and "dad sandals" ranging from Birkenstocks to luxury versions by Chanel were also popular. Chunky jewelry became a common accessory, while baggy jeans paired with polo shirts reflected casual styling. Cardigans, often described as a revival of 1990s fashion, gained renewed use as lightweight outerwear. Tie-dye prints attracted interest, in part due to their accessibility as do it yourself activity. Corset tops were introduced as versatile garments, while loungewear sets and animal prints maintained steady visibility in mainstream fashion.

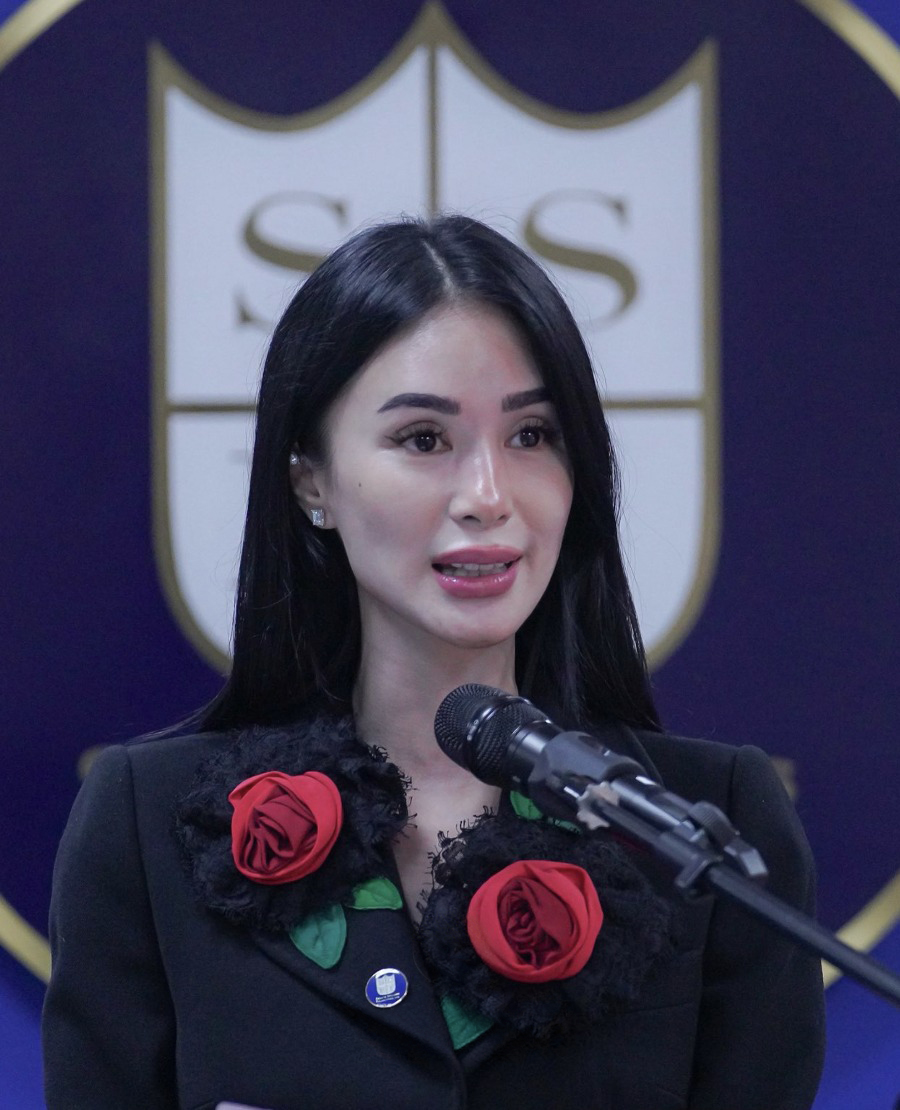
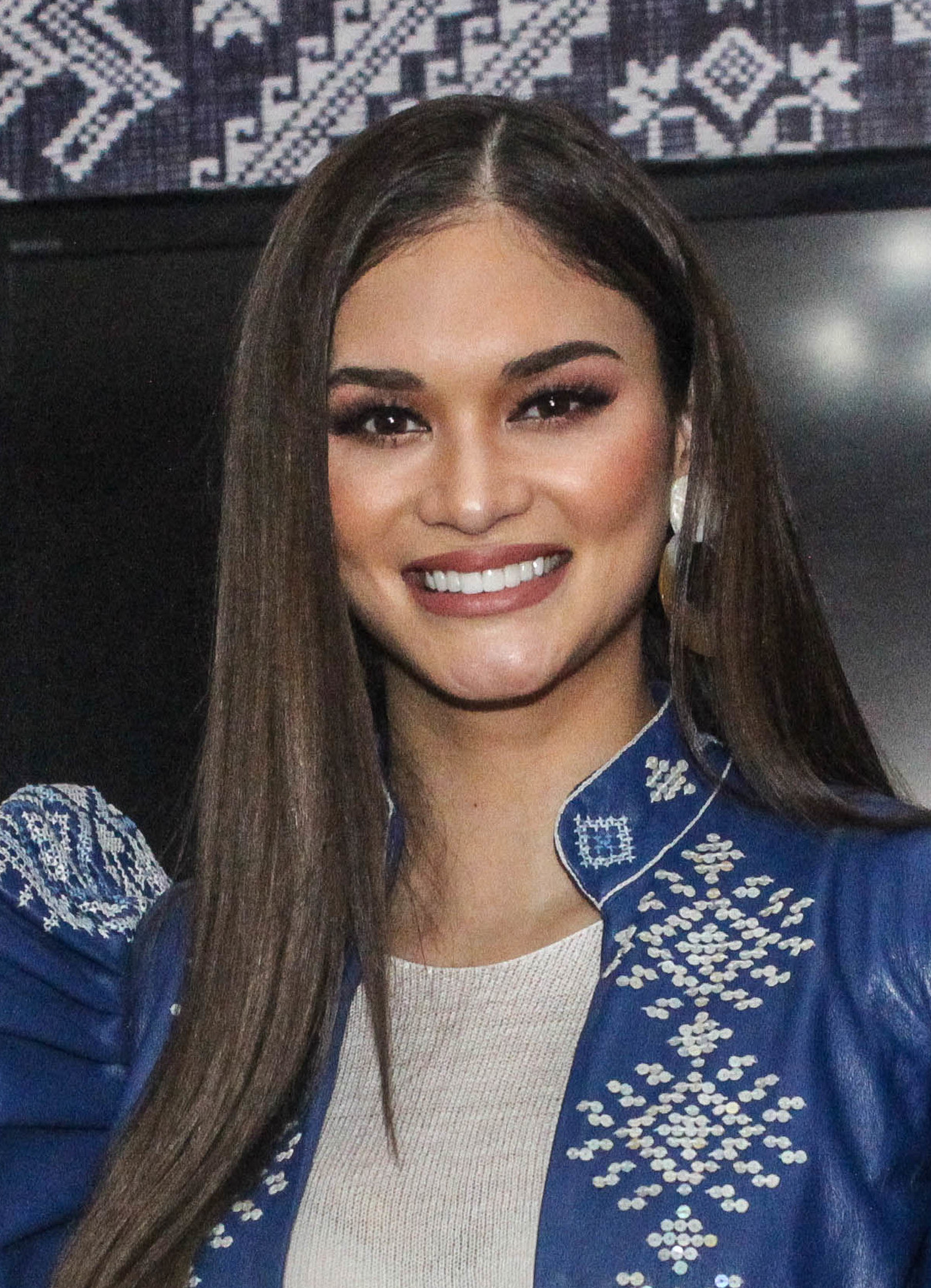
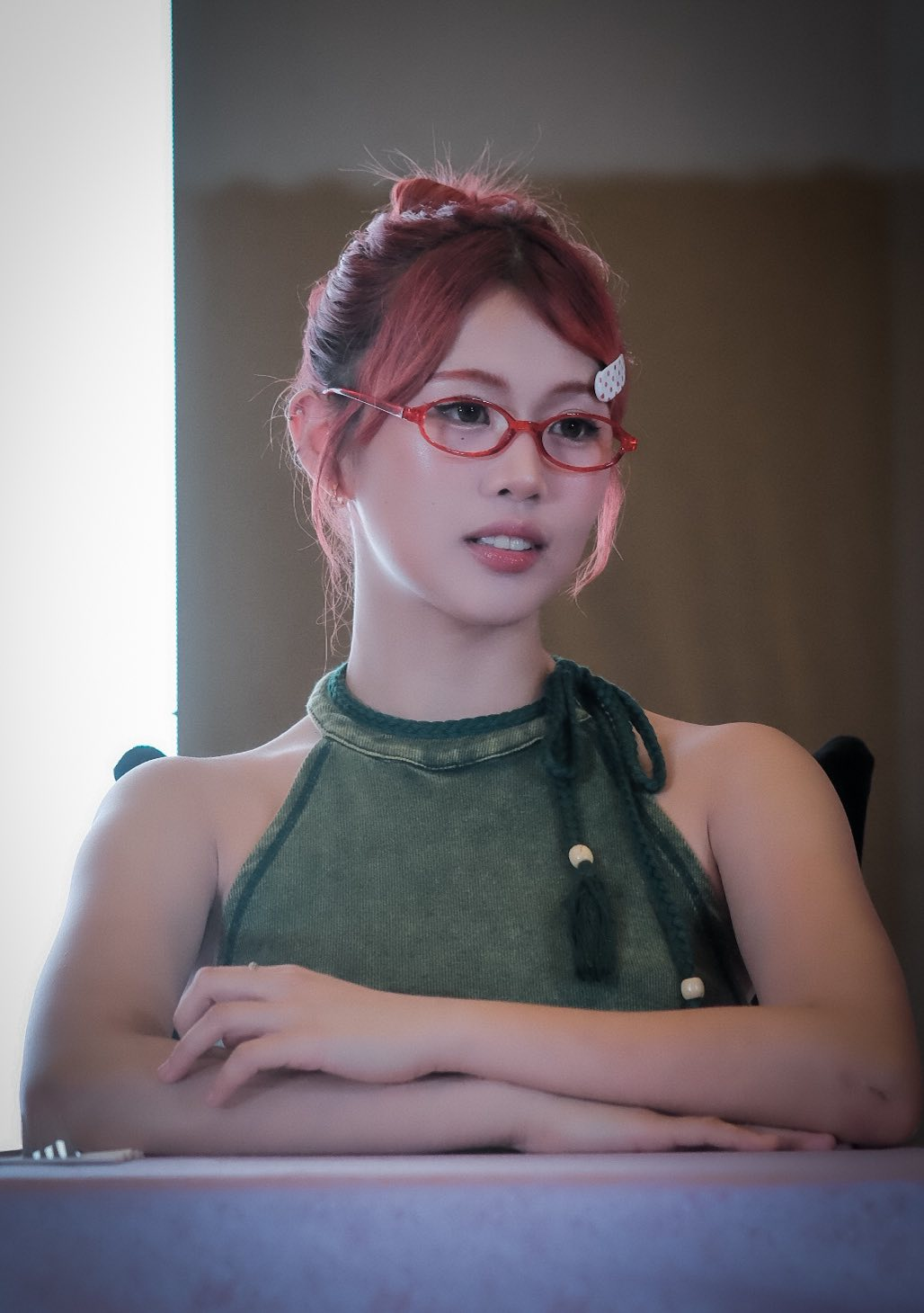
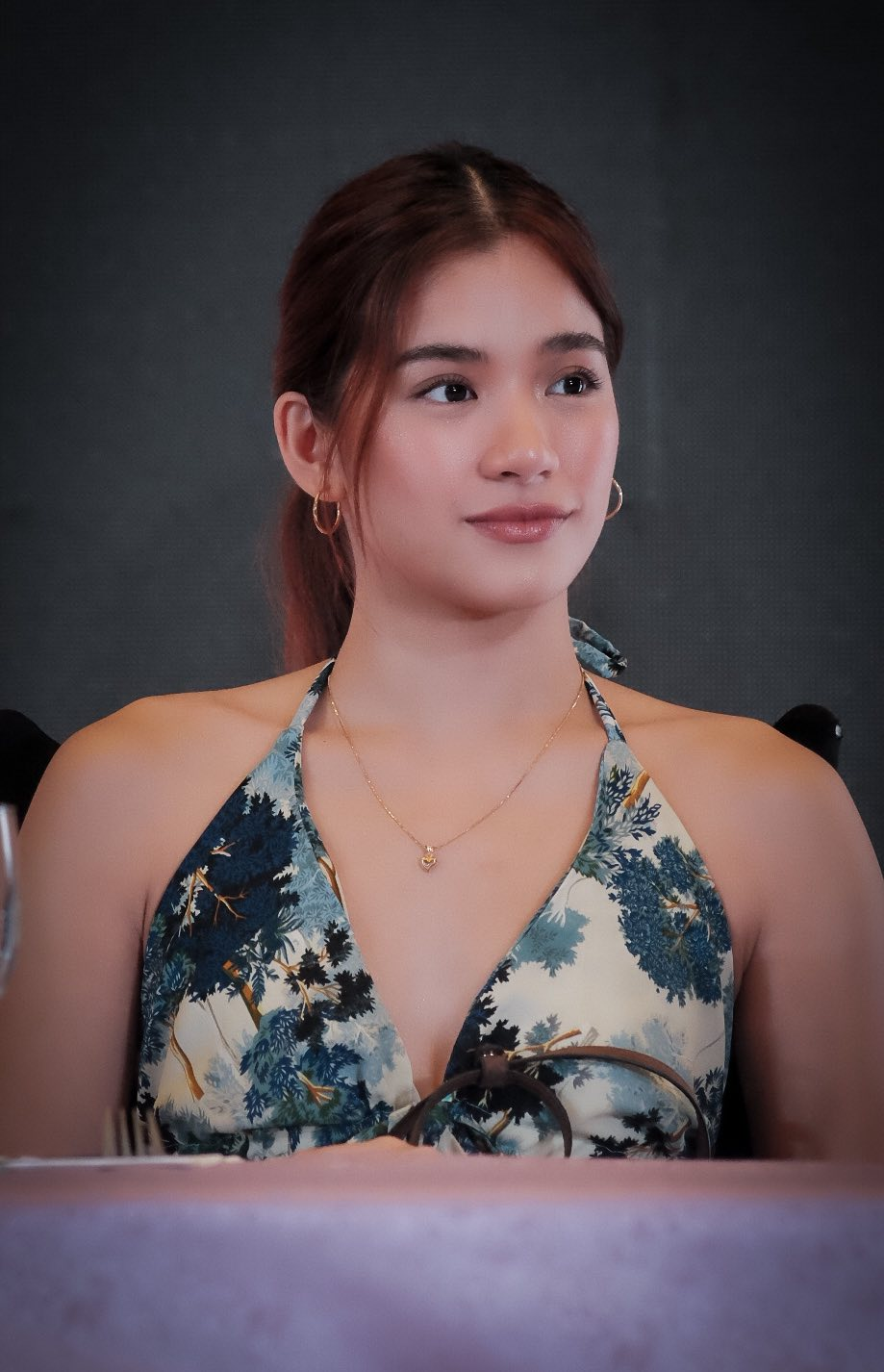
Heart Evangelista (upper left), Pia Wurtzbach (upper right), Maloi Ricalde (lower left), and Aiah Arceta (lower right) who helped define 2020s fashion.

Filipino personalities have continued to make in the international fashion scene. Heart Evangelista led the Media Impact Value rankings at Paris and Milan Fashion Weeks. Pia Wurtzbach, Miss Universe 2015, also gained recognition for her evolving fashion choices, which combined polished and bold elements in shows for brand such as Gucci and Tommy Hilfiger. Bini member Maloi Ricalde was dubbed "Maloi-core" for her distinctive fashion sense. Her style, often compared to the street looks in Fruits magazine, includes combinations like oversized jerseys with knee-length plaid skirts. She has also shared that she buys from ukay-ukay to incorporate into her outfits. She also featured in Vogue Philippines, wearing a Louis Vuitton top and skirt. Kara Angan of Billboard Philippines highlighted Aiah Arceta's fashion sense, noting her ability to "bring the right energy and distinctness" to avant-grade ensembles reminiscent of the Met Gala. Angan also remarked that there are "many ways Aiah can pull off a high-fashion piece".

== Traditional clothing by areas and regions ==
Ethnic clothing was worn by the members of different ethnic tribes around the country before the Spanish colonized the islands. Today, they are still often worn during gatherings, festivals, and for cultural shows.

=== Cordilleras ===
==== Igorot ethnic outfit ====
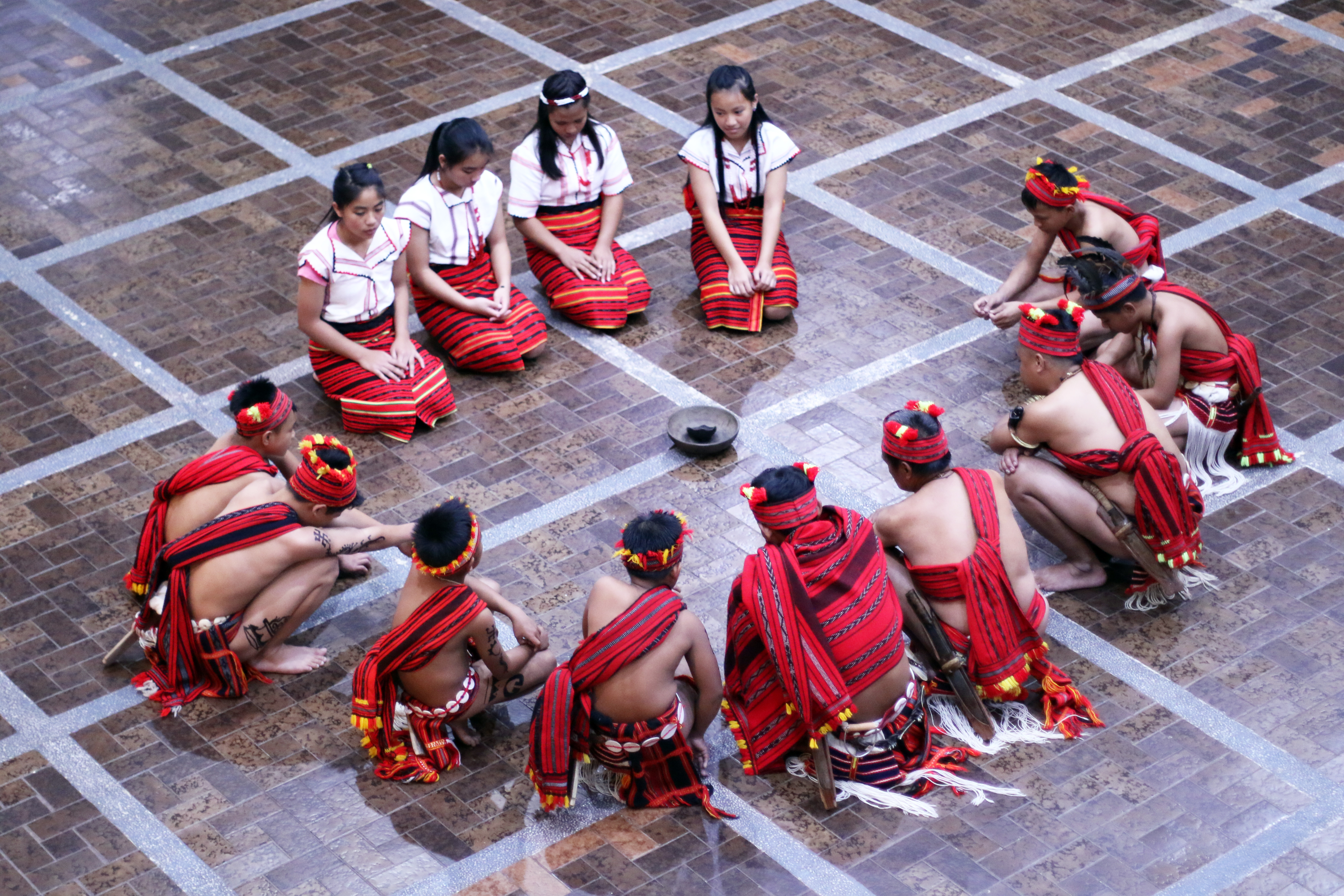
Ifugao youth in their traditional clothing

The Igorots are indigenous peoples from the Cordilleras. They are known for wearing a piece of clothing with intricate patterns woven by their own fellowmen. The men's traditional clothing consists of red loincloth called wanes with tribal patterns, tattoos which is a symbol for bravery, and colorful bead necklaces. Women's clothing are usually similar to men's except that the women wear wrap-around skirt or called lufid and usually topless. In some parts of Cordilleras such as the Igorots in Benguet, women wrap their breasts with a very detailed wrap-around clothing.

=== Lowland Christians ===
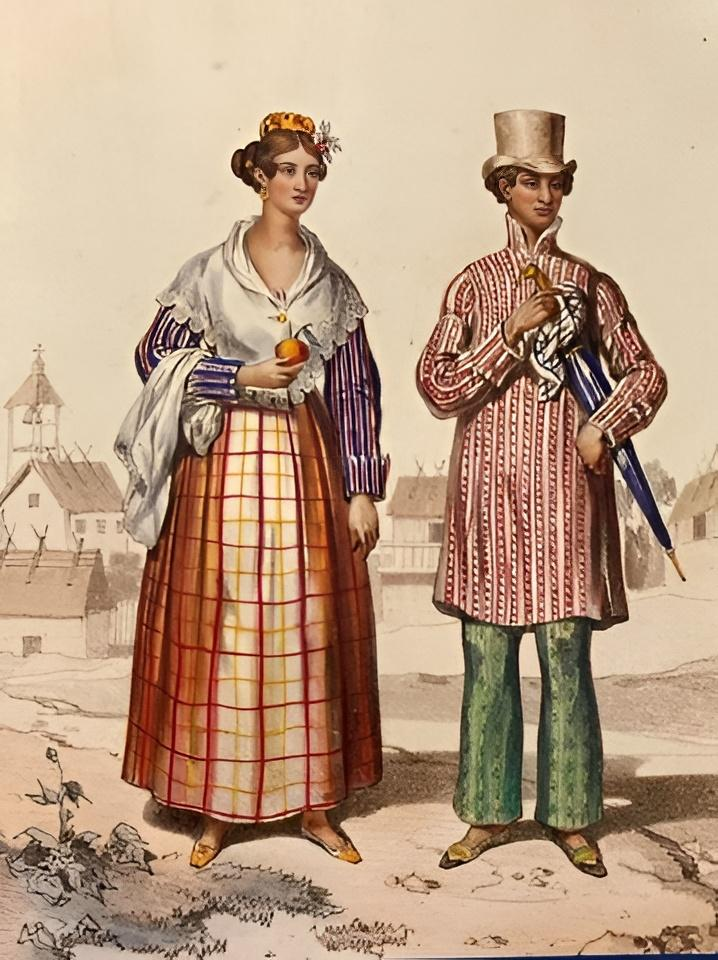
Barong Tagalog and Baro't Saya worn by Spanish Mestizo Filipinos.

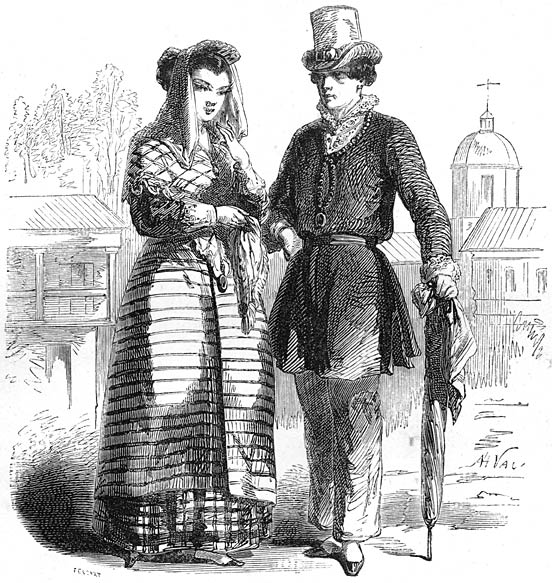
Filipino couple, early 1800s

==== Women's clothing ====
Baro't Saya (literally "shirt and skirt") is the Filipino style of women's clothing. Traditionally, it is composed of a blouse and a long skirt with a pañuelo (fichu or scarf). It evolved many variants, some are regional, while upper-class women wore more elaborate baro't saya sewn with beads and colorful designs. Their skirts would also tend to be wider than those worn by the lower classes.

These types of clothing that are "simple yet functional" that have both indigenous Filipino qualities and Spanish influence started to become prominent during the 16th-century in the Philippines.

Such clothing, through the innovation of modern-day Filipino fashion designers, can be worn in the Philippines for formal occasions and office uniforms. These can be made from materials such as piña, jusi, abaca, and Mindanao silk.

===== Baro't Saya =====
The Baro't Saya is commonly worn among women of the lowland Christian majority. The basic ensemble includes the blouse called baro and a skirt called saya. It is the achetype of Filipiniana dress that has evolved throughout the colonial era, and today, the dress represents the rural life in the Philippines.

===== María Clara Dress =====
Being the capital which is also located in the lowland Christian urban area, women in Manila often wore more elaborate versions of Baro't Saya with fuller skirts and richer fabrics. Throughout the 17th to 18th centuries, this clothing also became popular with upper and middle class inhabitants of other parts of the country, mostly urban areas such as Cebu, Iloilo, Negros Occidental and many more. Today, this particular form is known as the María Clara gown representative of the colonial-era aristocracy.

During the American period, the design drastically changed from a wide skirts to trendier cuts and silhouettes, becoming the unified terno popularized by former First Lady Imelda Marcos in the 1960s.

===== Kimona and Patadyong =====
In the Visayas, the Kimona is the more typical female garment. Most Visayan lowland women wear this type of Baro't Saya which comprises a blouse of a different cut paired with a knee-length skirt. Kimona is typically transparent and made of pineapple fibre while the skirt is usually either knee- to floor-length in a Patadyóng design. The dress is often accompanied with a handkerchief called tubao and is often placed upon the right shoulder.

==== Men's clothing ====
===== Barong Tagalog =====
Barong tagalog is a clothing worn by men. Originating in Luzon, this clothing is made of pineapple fiber and is translucent, and an undershirt has to be worn together with dark pants.

===== Camisa de Chino =====
A traditional Filipino sleeved shirt, typically collarless, with a two or three-button opening at the front. It is often associated with laborers of Chinese / Sangley ethnic group of the Philippines during the Spanish colonial era

===== Suit =====
The "Coat" or "suits", locally known as the "Amerikana" or Americana (literally "American") was a type of clothing introduced to the Philippines by the Americans. Worn with a tie, it is used for formal occasions.

=== Mindanao ===
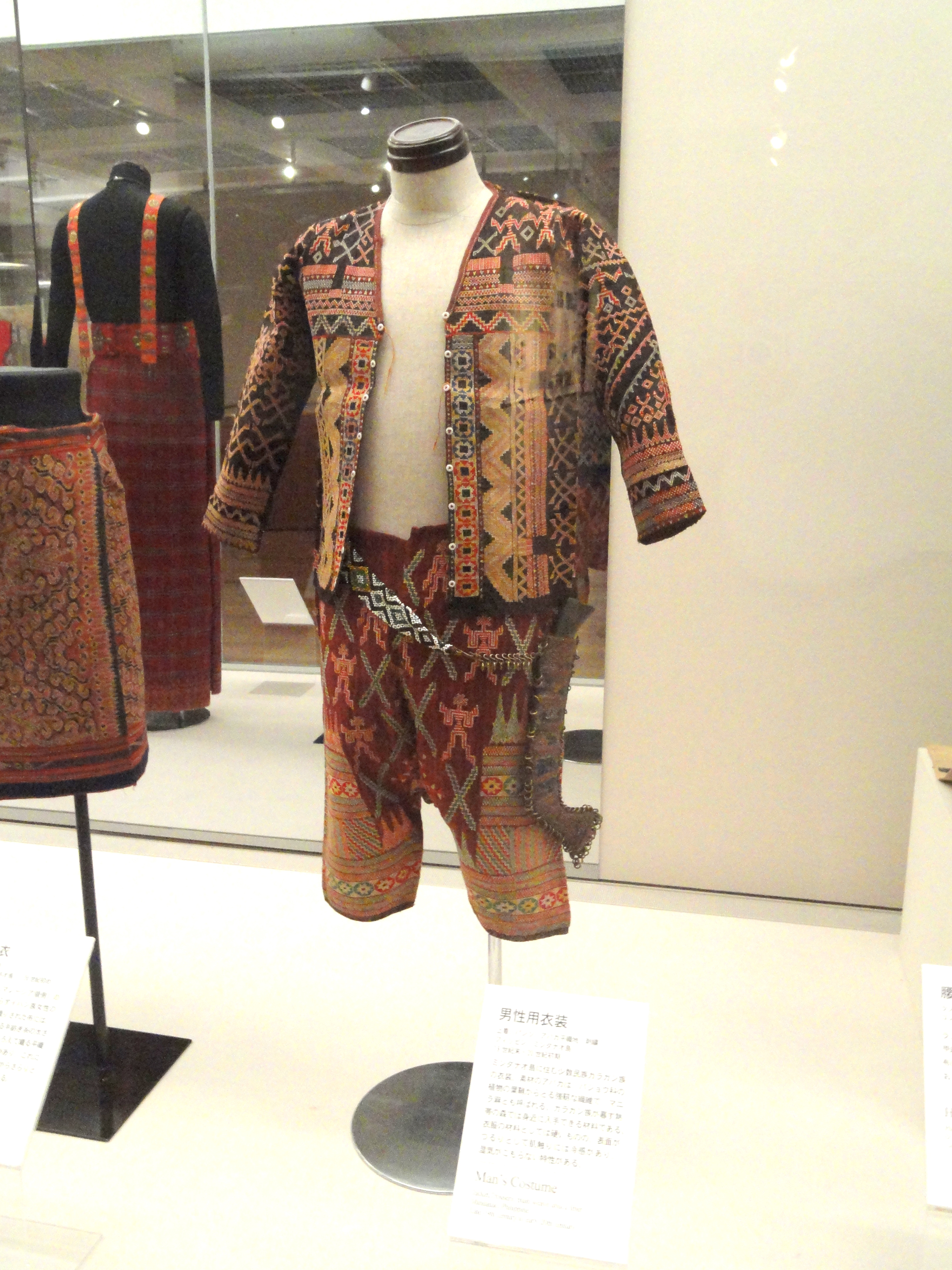
A men's clothing from Mindanao exhibiting at the Bunka Gakuen Costume Museum in Tokyo, Japan.

In Mindanao, a large minority of the people are practicing Islam, therefore following the Islamic culture. Women wear a hijab, a long-sleeved top and a floor-length skirt, while men wear polos and pants together with a hat called taqiyah. Non Islamic people follow Visayan-like fashion.

== Fashion designers ==
Notable Filipino fashion designers include Pitoy Moreno, Ito Curata, Inno Sotto, Rajo Laurel, Kermit Tesoro, Beatriz Tesoro, Christian Espiritu, Auggie Cordero, Monique Lhuillier, Ezra Santos, Mich Dulce, Francis Libiran, Oliver Tolentino, Josie Natori, and Michael Cinco. Moreno was known to design and create dresses for Philippine First Ladies. A newly emerging Filipino designer is Wolfram Philippines who introduced iconic Filipino wardrobes through the pop group BGYO.

== Popular brands ==
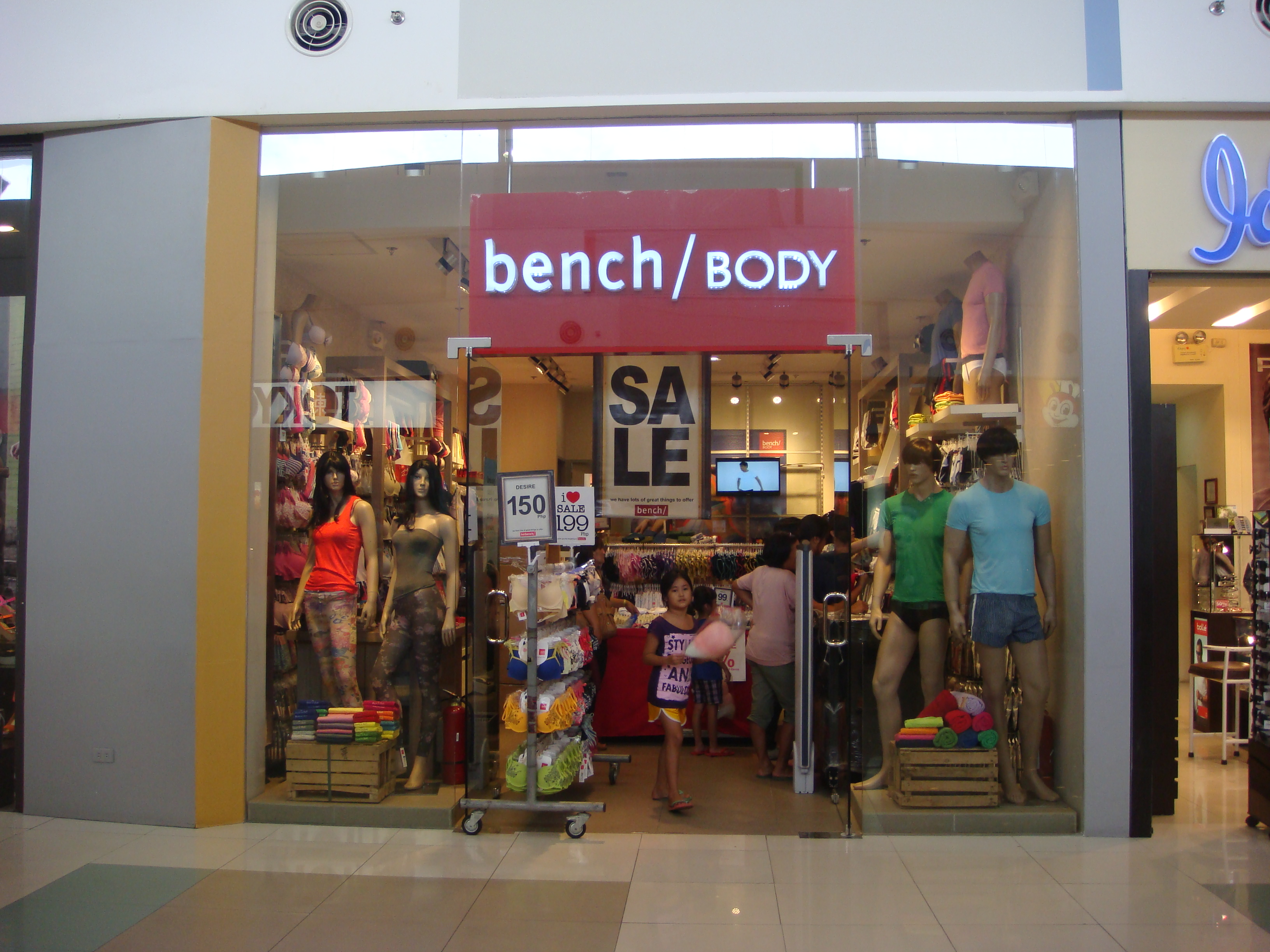
Bench, a Filipino clothing brand

=== Filipino brands ===
Philippine brand clothing that are popular in and outside the Philippines include Crispa, Bench, Onesimus, Michel André, Penshoppe, Loalde, Kamiseta (literally "T-shirt"), Maldita and Bayo.

=== International brands ===
Brands from abroad that are popular in the Philippines include Giordano, Levi's, Nike, The Gap, Banana Republic and Guess.

- First tier includes top designer's labels that are not common to average Filipinos, including Hermès, Bottega Veneta, Louis Vuitton, Givenchy, Burberry, Prada, Gucci.
- Second tier showcases brands that are affordable to average Filipinos which include Ralph Lauren, Balenciaga, Michael Kors, Nine West, Kate Spade, Longchamp and Fendi.
- Third tier are the high street brands that are a bit expensive for average Filipinos, including Comme des Garcons, Lacoste, Diesel, Marks & Spencer, Tommy Hilfiger, Kenneth Cole.
- Fourth tier are affordable brands that are good quality, which includes, Uniqlo, Mango, Zara, and Aldo".
- Fifth tier are brands that are very much affordable to an average Filipino and usually of a lower quality, Forever 21, H&M, and Guess.

== See also ==
- Philippine Fashion Week
- Project Runway Philippines
- 2010s in Philippine Fashion
- Buntal hat
- Rayadillo
- Manila shawl
- Baju Melayu
