= Guayabera =

Type of men's shirt

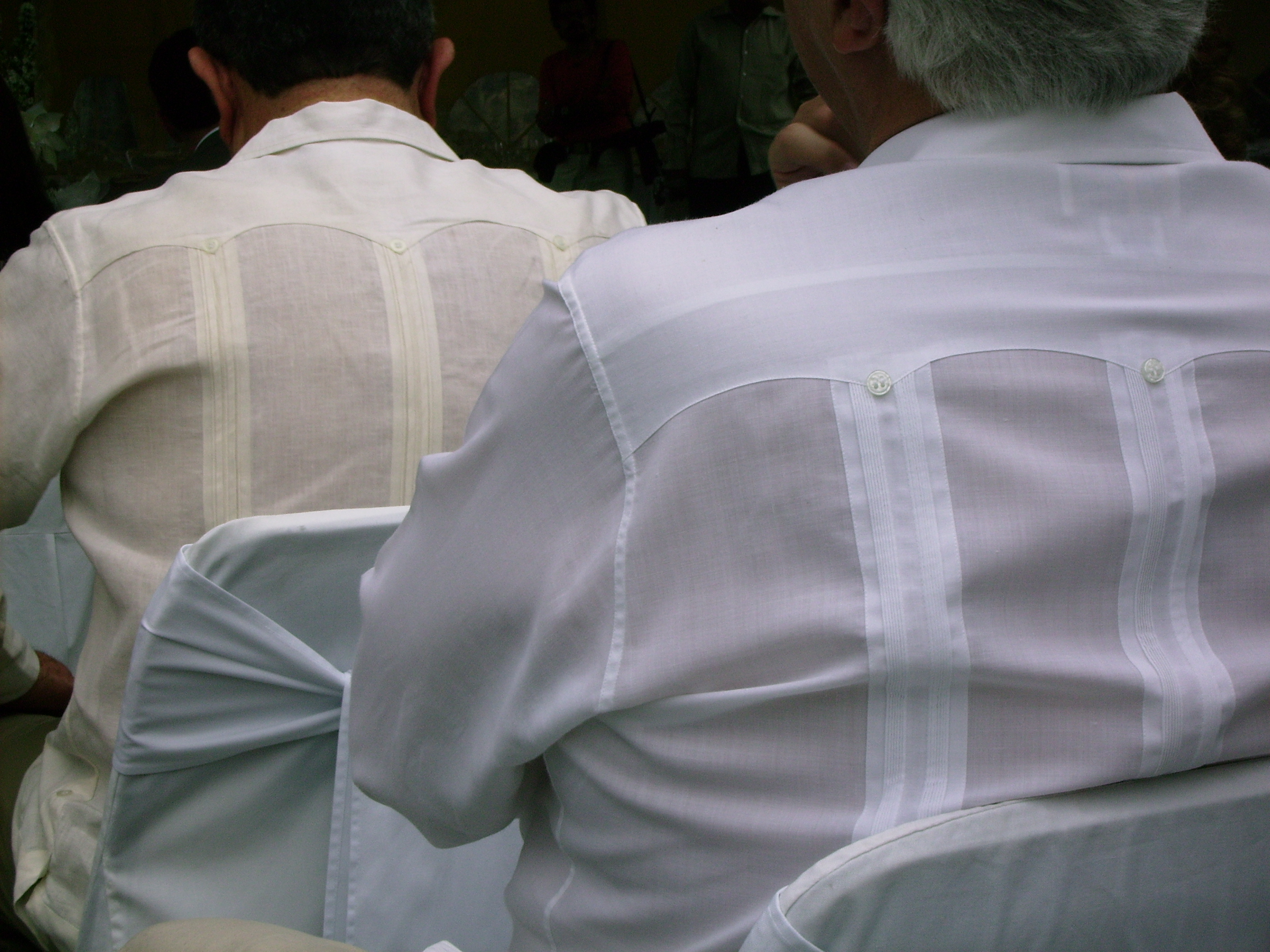
Two guayaberas seen from the back, showing the alforza pleats and the Western-style yoke

The guayabera is a men's summer shirt, worn outside the trousers, distinguished by two columns of closely sewn pleats running the length of the front and back of the shirt. Typically made of linen, silk, or cotton, and appropriate for hot and/or humid weather, guayaberas are popular in Ecuador, Colombia, Mexico, Central America, the Caribbean (especially Cuba, the Dominican Republic, Panama, Haiti, and Puerto Rico), South America, Southeast Asia (specifically the Philippines), Spain (specifically Andalucia and the Canary Islands), and Portugal.

== Design ==
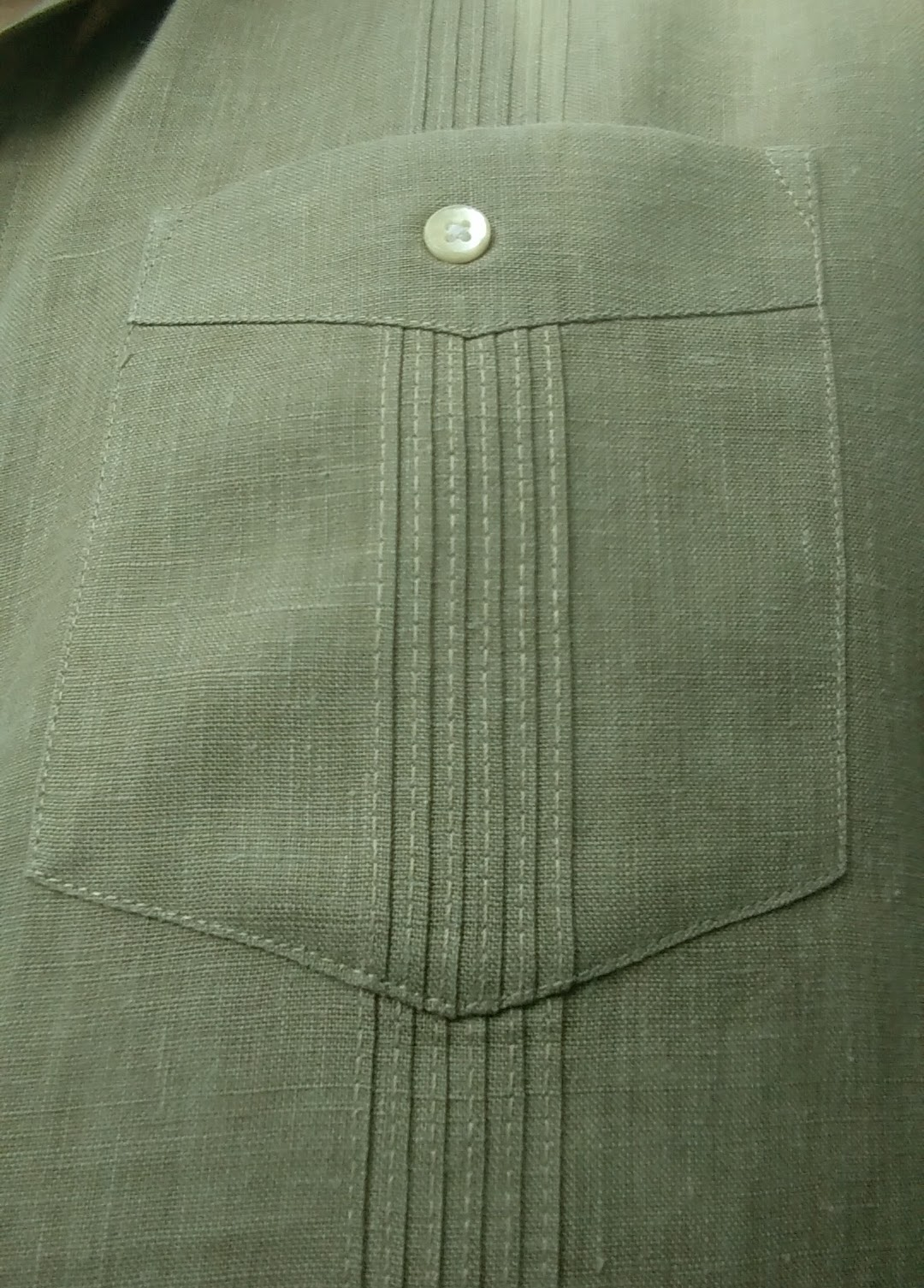
Closeup of a pocket on a guayabera, showing the button and aligned alforzas

The design of a typical guayabera is distinguished by several details:

- Either two or four patch pockets and two vertical rows of alforzas (fine, tiny pleats, usually 10, sewn closely together) run down the front and three down the back of the shirt. The pockets are detailed with alforzas that are identical to, and aligned with, the alforzas on the body of the shirt.
- Long or short sleeves, the more common being the short-sleeved version, having a cuffed sleeve with a single decorative button.
- Some shirt designs include slits on either side, and these include two or three buttons. The bottom has a straight hem and is never tucked into the trousers.
- The top of each pocket is usually adorned with a matching shirt button, as are the bottoms of the alforza pleats. Vertical rows of adjusting buttons are often used at the bottom hem. While most versions of the design have no placket covering the buttons, a few newer designs do.

Though traditionally worn in white and pastels, guayaberas are now available in many solid colors.

Mexican guayaberas often use complicated embroidery as a supplement to the traditional alforzas. This style originated in Mérida, Mexico.

== History ==
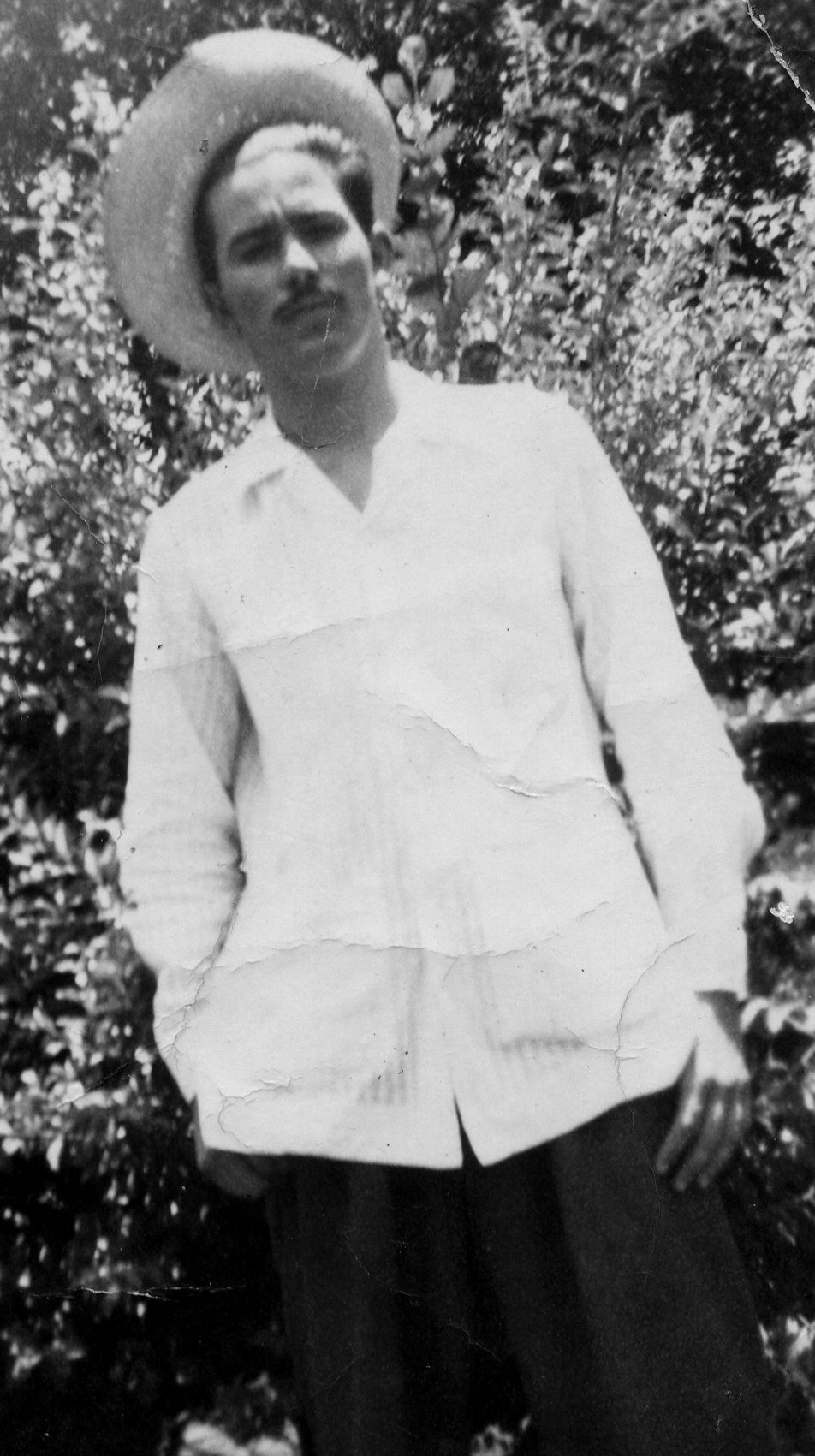
Cuban man wearing a guayabera c. 1956

The exact origin of the garment is unknown, although some historians attribute the shirt to the people of the Philippines who introduced the design to Mexico via the Manila-Acapulco galleon trade, from there spreading to Cuba and the rest of the Caribbean. Specifically, the design is believed to be from the baróng tagalog, which has documented origins in the Philippines prior to Spanish colonisation in the late 16th century.

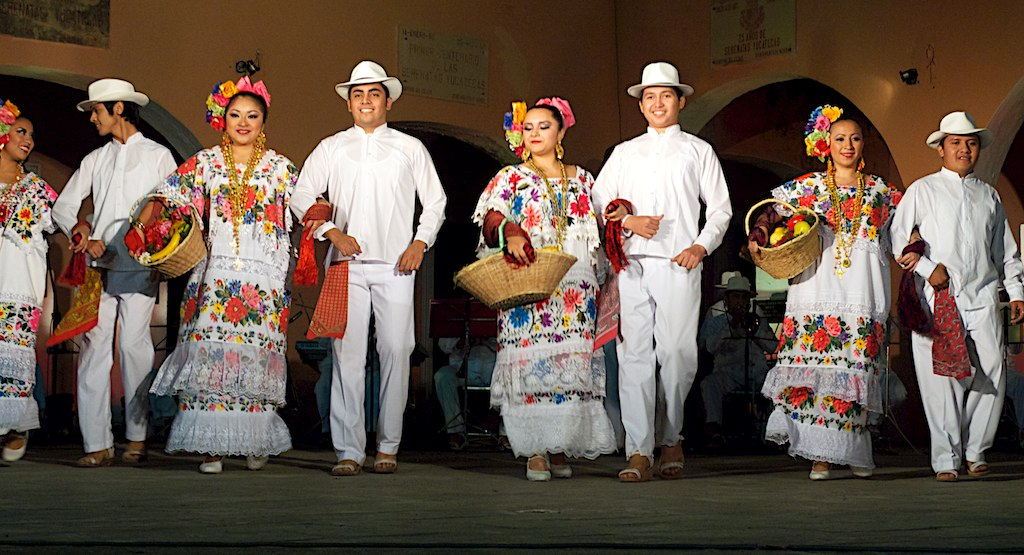
Men wearing white filipina shirts in the traditional jarana Yucateca dance of Yucatán, Mexico

Some scholars dispute the Philippine origin based on perceived design differences. The baróng traditionally does not have pockets, instead having an intricate U-shaped embroidery pattern around the chest (hence the name pechera), which is mostly absent in Cuban guayaberas. Guayaberas are also invariably made from opaque linen or cotton, unlike the baróng tagalog which has two grades: cheaper variants for everyday wear are made from more common, opaque fabrics (like linen), while expensive embroidered sheer piña or abacá fabrics are worn by the upper classes.

However, guayaberas in Mexico also have chest designs like pleats and embroidery similar to the baróng and in contrast to Cuban guayaberas; they can range from having no pockets to having one, two, or four. This is the reason why Mexicans also claim it originated from either the state of Veracruz or the Yucatán Peninsula. In Mexico, the same basic style is also known as the "camisa de Yucatán" ("Yucatán shirt") or "wedding shirt".

Regardless, a clearer line of evidence is that guayaberas are actually also referred to as "filipinas" in Yucatán, with the former regarded as a variant of the latter. The only difference between the two is the type of collar used. Filipinas have a collar similar to the Nehru or mandarin-style (a style known as the baro cerrada in 19th-century Philippines), while guayaberas have a more typical spread collar. Both filipinas and the derivative guayaberas were the traditional everyday men's shirts in Yucatán since the mid-19th century, before these were replaced by western shirts in the early 20th century. The white filipina shirt is still regarded as traditional formal dress for men in Yucatán, along with the terno for women (cf. traje de Mestiza of the Philippines). In particular, white filipinas are the traditional shirts worn for the jarana Yucateca dance, paired with white trousers. This suggests an origin from the Philippines that entered Mexico early during the colonial period through Yucatán then to Cuba, where it was later adapted to local fashion and materials.

Cubans also claim the guayabera originated in Cuba, although records there of the guayabera appear much later. Cuban literature first refers to the shirt from 1893, and documentary evidence first mentions the shirt in Cuba in 1880. The Cuban origin story tells of a poor countryside seamstress sewing large patch-pockets onto her husband's shirts for carrying guava (guayabas) from the field. In another version of the story, in 1709 Spanish immigrants from Granada, José Pérez Rodríguez and his wife Encarnación Núñez García arrived in Sancti Spiritus along the Yayabo River. José asked his wife to make him a shirt with long sleeves and four large pockets to store his cigars and belongings while he worked. Because it was easy to make, as well as being useful, it soon became a popular garment in that region. Another belief is that the name guayabera is said to have originated from the word yayabero, the nickname for those who lived near the Yayabo River in Cuba.

== Wear and use ==
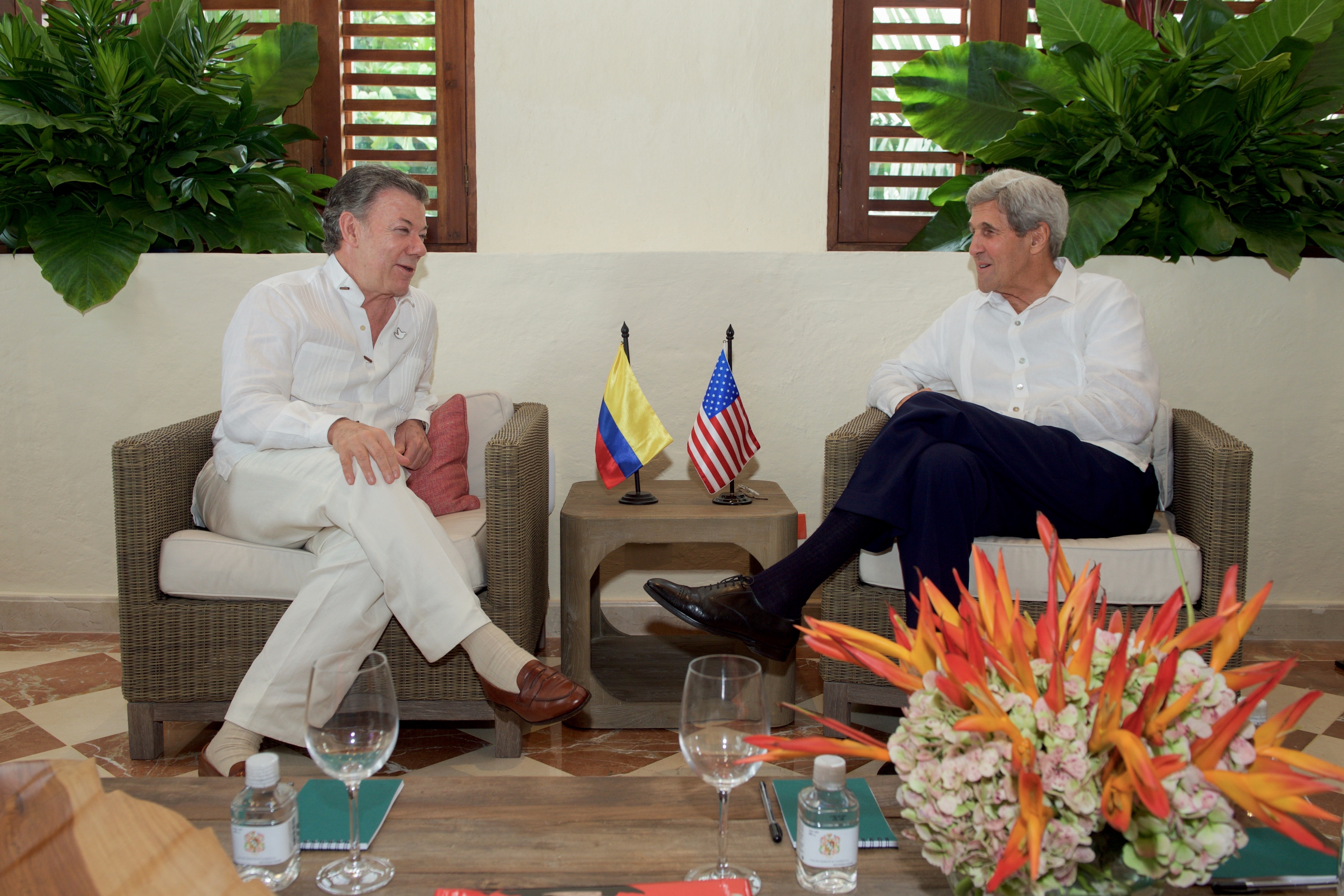
Former United States Secretary of State John Kerry and former Colombian President Juan Manuel Santos wear guayaberas while discussing an upcoming peace treaty.

The guayabera is often worn in formal contexts, such as offices and weddings. In Cuba, the Dominican Republic, Mexico, and Puerto Rico, guayaberas are part of the traditional wear for men and may be considered formalwear. In 2010, Cuba reinstated the guayabera as the "official formal dress garment".

== Political symbolism ==
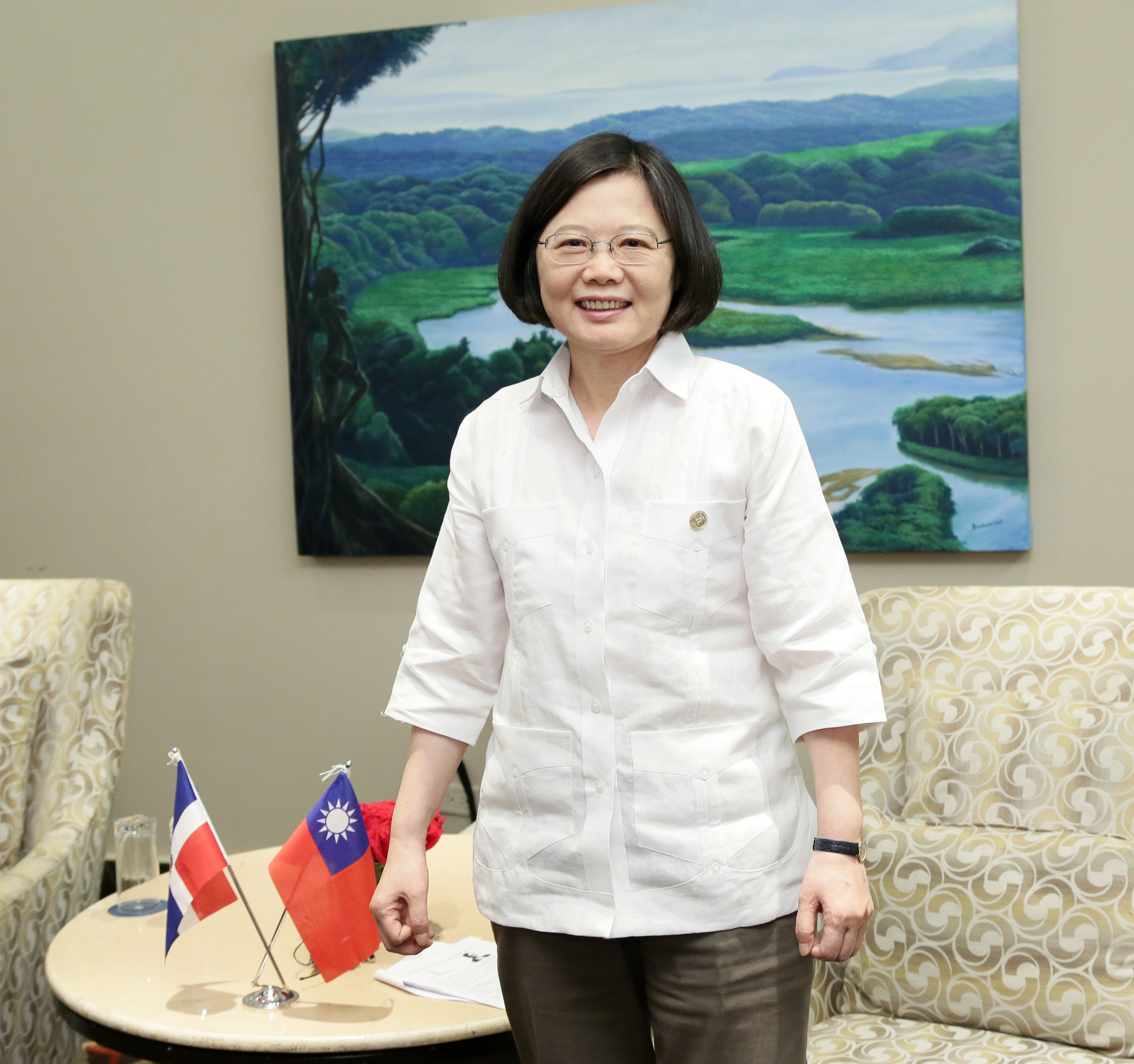
Taiwanese President Tsai in guayabera gifted by Panama's first lady

Guayaberas have been worn extensively by a number of Latin American political leaders, including Andrés Manuel López Obrador, Cesar Chavez, Carlos Prío Socarrás, and Fidel Castro. This is often interpreted as a sign of the wearer's affiliation with populist political positions. Michael Manley, populist Jamaican prime minister, specifically advocated for the guayabera as an anti-colonialist mode of dress, and conversely the shirt was later banned in Parliament by the conservative Jamaica Labour Party. Similarly, Mexican left-wing populist Luis Echeverría advocated for its use in Mexico in part to symbolize rejection of European and American-style business suits.

U.S. presidents, including Ronald Reagan, George H. W. Bush, and Barack Obama, have worn the shirts as a sign of solidarity when visiting the Cuban community in Miami and when attending Latin American summits. Visiting politicians are sometimes given the shirts by Cuban American or Latin American political leaders.

== Similar shirts and alternative names ==
A variety of similar, lightweight dress shirts exists in other tropical countries. These include:

- In the United States of America: the Western shirts with pointed yokes and elaborate embroidery were directly copied from the guayaberas of 19th century Mexican vaqueros.
- In Guyana: a similar or identical shirt is called a "shirt-jac".
- In Jamaica: the guayabera is called a "bush jacket".
- In the Dominican Republic: guayaberas are referred to as chacabana. They are worn for both formal and casual occasions. In tropical countries like the Dominican Republic, chacabanas are used for black tie events such as weddings, business meetings and even political events.
- In the Philippines: the baróng Tagalog shirt has some features which are similar to the guayabera: it is long-sleeved, light, traditionally white, and worn without being tucked in. However, the most traditional styles are decorated with U-shaped embroidery (the pechera), rather than the guayabera's straight pleats, and lack pockets. It is also traditionally made of hand-woven, fine, and translucent piña or jusi cloth.
- In Trinidad and Tobago, physicians often wear them because of their practicality; one pocket for pens, one for a prescription pad, another for a stethoscope, etc.

== See also ==
- Mantón de Manila
