= Manila shawl =

Type of embroidered silk shawl

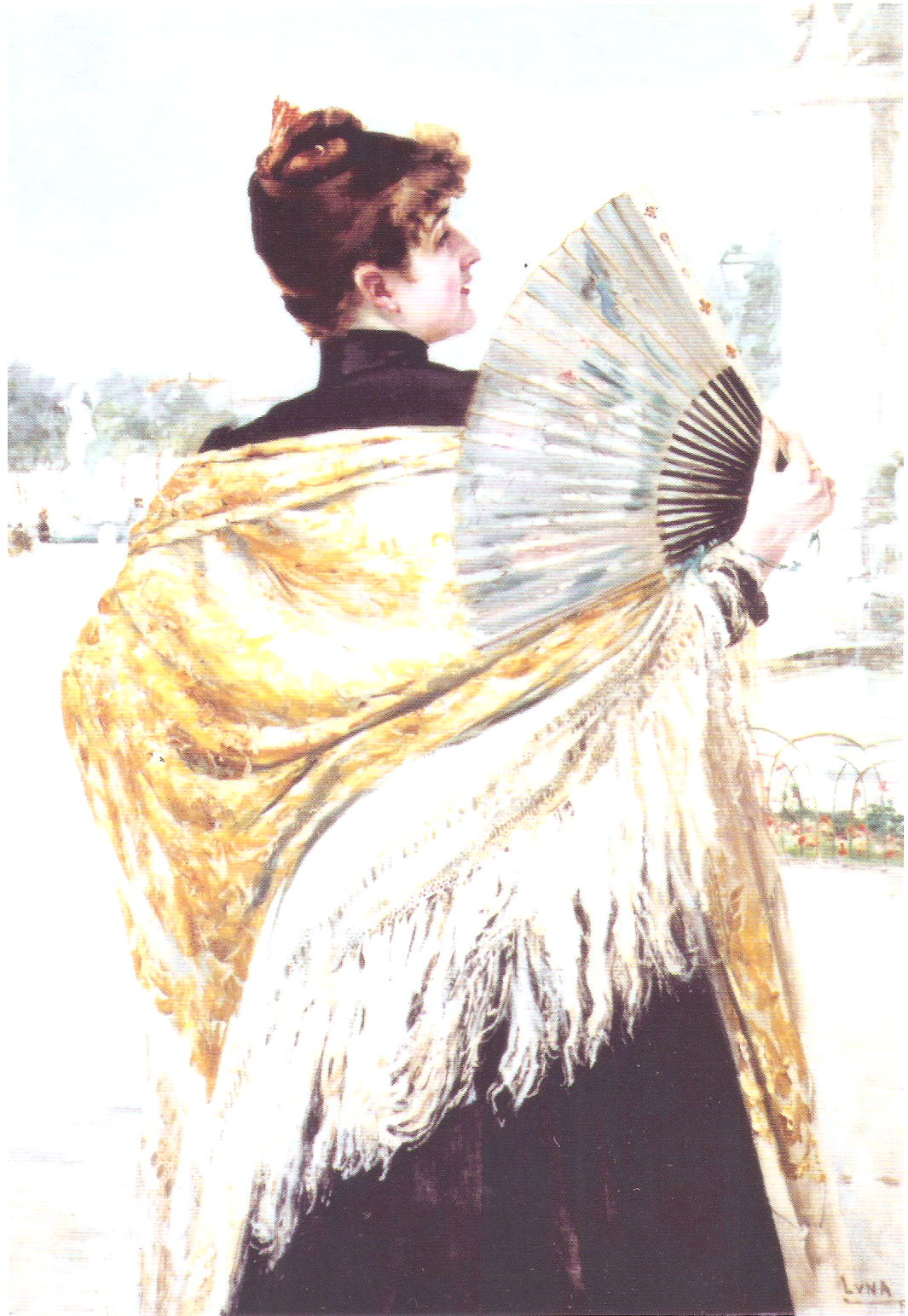
- Mujer con mantón de Manila by the Filipino painter Juan Luna (c. 1880s)
- Type: Embroidered shawl
- Material: Silk
- Place of origin: Philippines, Spain
- Introduced: 18th century

The Manila shawl (Spanish: mantón de Manila or mantón de seda) is an embroidered silk shawl derived from the Philippine alampay or scarf (likely from the Luzonian or Tagalog variant). They were popular in the Philippines, Latin America, and Spain during the colonial era. It was also adopted and became popular in European fashions in the 19th century. In modern times, it is still an aspect of various traditional clothing in Hispanic cultures and is particularly prominent as part of the costume (traje de flamenca) of flamenco dancers (bailaoras) and Gitana women.

== Description ==
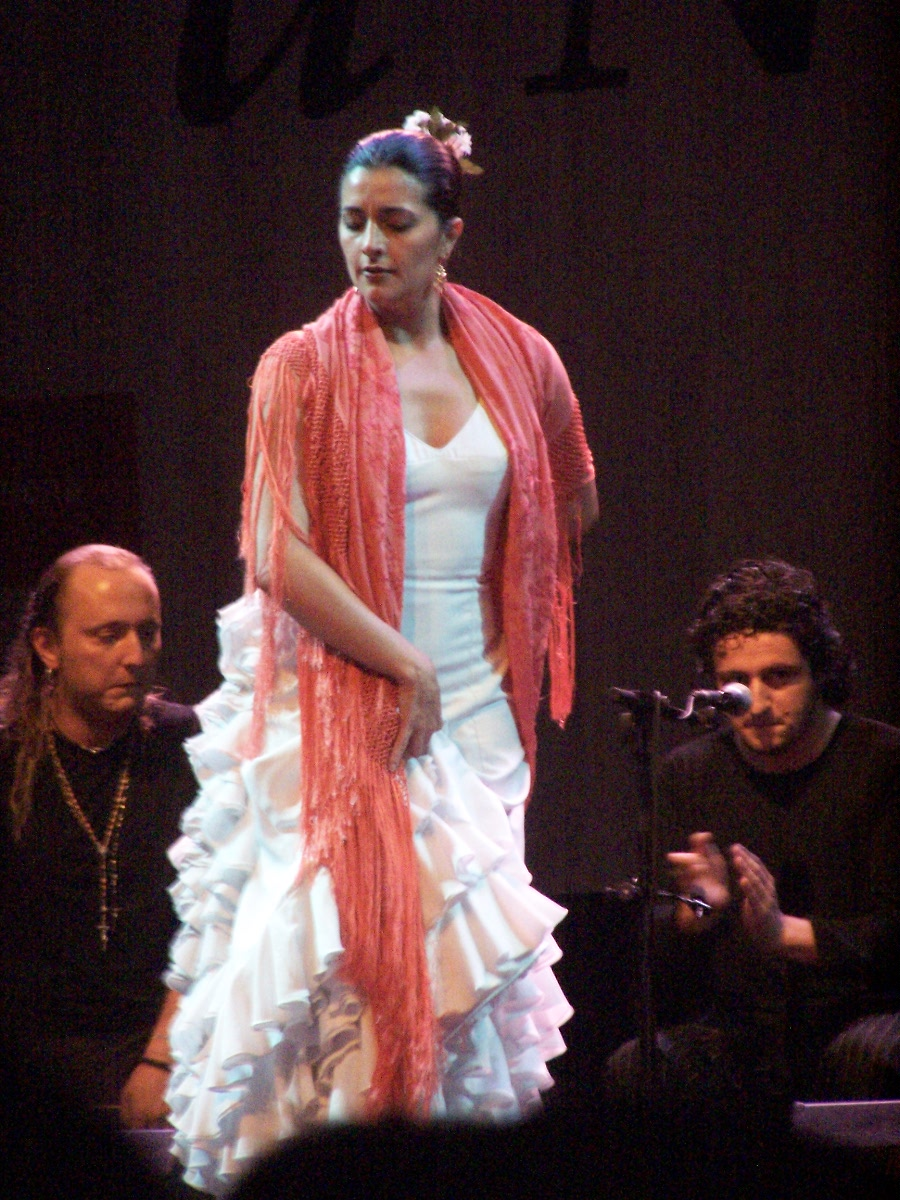
A flamenco dancer (bailaora) with a Manila shawl

Manila shawls are square silk garments embroidered with chinoiserie-style motifs. They were typically folded in half to form a triangle and worn over the shoulders.

== History ==
Traditional shawls in the Philippines were known as alampay. These were head and neck coverings worn by pre-colonial Tagalog women. Like later Manila shawls, they were square and folded in half to form a triangle when worn over the shoulders. They continued to be used during the Spanish colonial period and incorporated European design elements, including floral embroidery using techniques such as calado, sombrado, and deshilado.

In addition to the native abacá fiber, they were also made from piña fiber, acquired from pineapples introduced by the Spanish. They also featured borders of lace or knotted fringes, a Spanish element which itself was acquired from the Moors. These Spanish-style shawls were known as pañuelos in Philippine Spanish, and were an integral part of the traditional traje de mestiza fashion of aristocratic Filipino women, as they brought modesty to the relatively low neckline of the traditional camisa shirts. They were also luxury goods exported via the Manila galleons to Nueva España and Europe, sometimes as gifts to royalty.

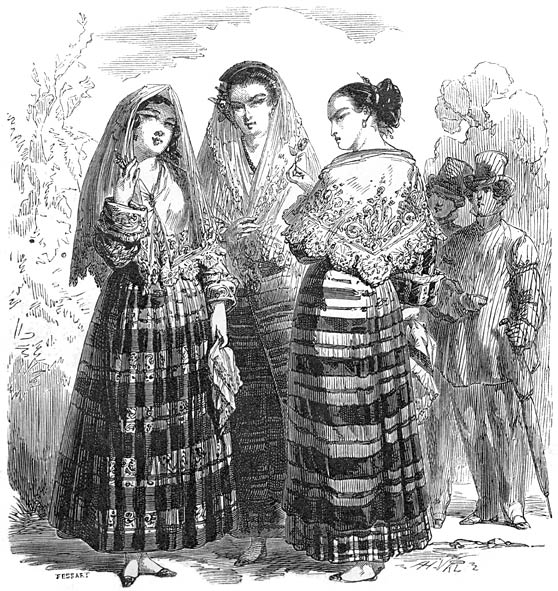
Filipina mestizas from the early 1800s with pañuelos over baro't saya, by Paul de la Gironiere

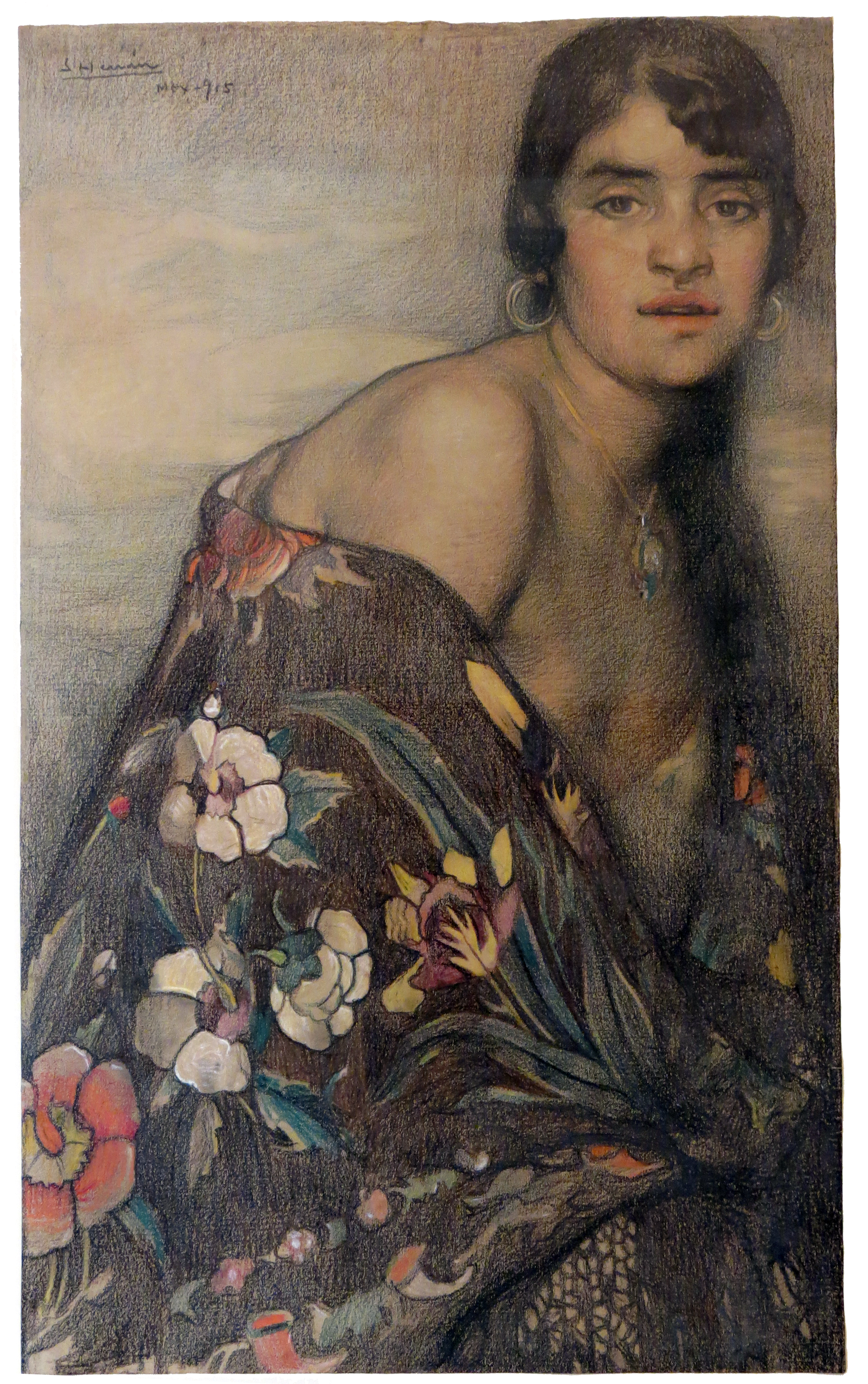
La Criolla del mantón by Mexican painter Saturnino Herrán (1915)

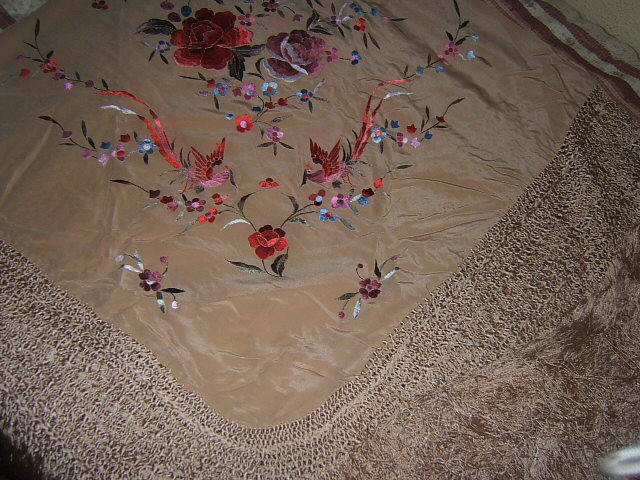
Detail of typical floral embroidery and fringes from a Spanish-made Manila shawl

Silk, though attempted numerous times, never became an established industry in the Philippines. Silk fabrics remained a Chinese monopoly, prompting the Spanish Empire to restrict silk trade with China in 1535, then banning it altogether in 1718, due to worries about the depletion of silver in Spanish treasuries. However, following protests by the middlemen in Manila, the silk ban was lifted in 1734, though it required silk to pass through Manila. This monopoly of Manila was later consolidated with the creation of the Royal Company of the Philippines in 1795.

Capitalizing on this new demand, Chinese factories in Canton (modern Guangzhou) and Macau started producing large quantities of painted or embroidered silk in the 18th century, for the sole purpose of exporting them to the Philippines and from there to further Spanish colonies and Europe.

Silk textiles in Chinese domestic markets were generally used for clothing, and their designs carried symbolic associations with social status. But these silk exports by China during the 17th to 19th centuries were non-traditional items tailored to the tastes of the European market. In particular, they mass-produced religious vestments for the Catholic clergy, tapestries, and pañuelo-style shawls. Although these early Chinese-made shawls typically featured Chinese motifs in the embroidery, like dragons, birds, butterflies, toads, lotus, flowers, and Chinese people and scenes, they also adapted non-Chinese conventions like the fringes that the Chinese observed from the Philippines.

These silk shawls became immensely popular in the Philippines and were quickly adopted into the local fashions of upper class Luzon women in the 18th and 19th centuries. Similarly, they became widely sought-after luxury exports soon after they reached the Americas. They are believed to have influenced later designs of the rebozo of Latin America.

Their popularity in Spain increased after Mexico's independence in 1815. The trade ships from Manila, which previously had to stop over in Acapulco, now had direct routes to Seville. During part of the 19th century, romanticism took over and Parisian fashions dictated that the shoulders of women should be left uncovered. Spanish women copied the fashion and they found that the Manila shawl was a very good thing to wear with these dresses, as the shawl provided some warmth to the bare shoulders. The Manila shawl was also used to decorate grand pianos in houses, as can be seen in the recently reopened Museo del Romanticismo in Madrid. Besides pianos, the shawl was also used to decorate sofas in elegant houses. Many Spanish houses today still use the Manila shawls to decorate pianos and sofas.

However, with the loss of the Philippines in 1898 in the aftermath of the Spanish–American War, Spain finally lost access to the silk trade. This spurred local weavers to recreate the embroideries in chinoiserie, favoring designs suited for European tastes while doing away with undesirable motifs like toads (a symbol of wealth in China) and pagodas. Their embroideries became denser and more colorful, with larger flowers resembling chintz. The knotted fringes also gradually became longer, accentuating movements by women as they walked or danced.

== Modern cultural significance ==
=== Philippines ===
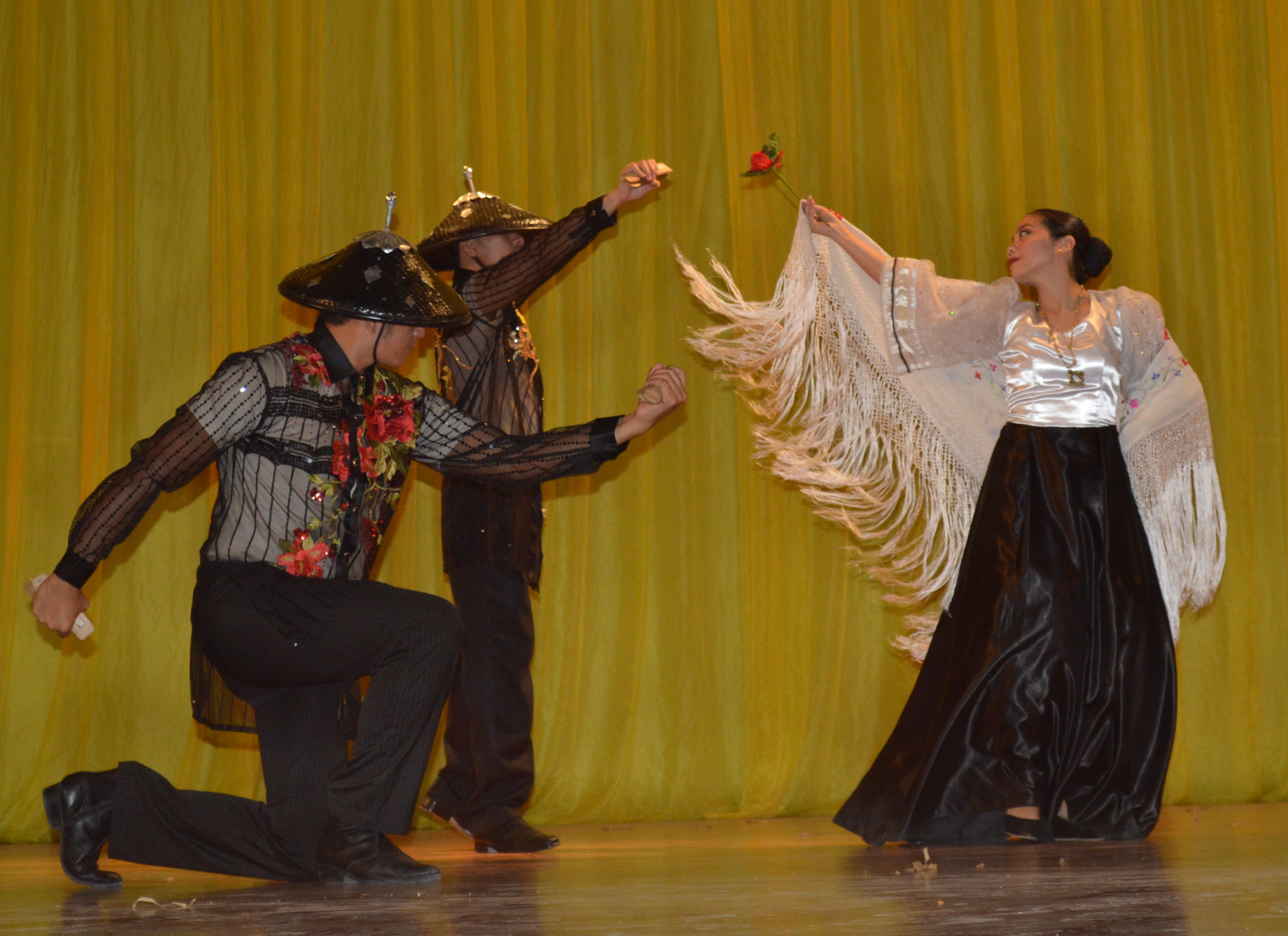
Dancers from the Philippines performing Jota Manileña. The woman is wearing a mantón de Manila over her traditional traje de mestiza dress. The men are wearing barong tagalog with salakot headgear

Mantón de Manila are still worn in the Philippines as a rarer alternative to the pañuelo. They are part of the traje de mestiza ensemble (the aristocratic version of the national dress, the baro't saya). They may also be worn with the modern terno, a unified gown version of the baro't saya.

=== Spain ===
Today, the Manila shawls are still very popular in Andalusia and in Madrid for special festive occasions. Women use the shawls for dressing up and going to parties. During the Festival of the Crosses of May in Cordoba, balconies are dressed up with the shawl that add a bright look to the plazas. During the April Fair in Seville, most of the women in Gypsy dress (flamenco dress) use the shawl as an accessory. The Manila shawl is also used by female flamenco dancers during their dance, as it is a great dance enhancer and adds drama when the flamenco dancer twirls it around her body and in the air. Sara Baras and Maria Pages are two of the most best flamenco dancers in Spain and they are experts in twirling their shawls during the dance. The Manila shawl is also a traditional accessory of the manola madrileña (the chulapa attire), during the annual San Isidro Fair. Famous Spanish singers who sing the copla, a traditional form of song, also are dressed in the Manila shawl. One of the most popular singers of this genre is Isabel Pantoja, and she has a great variety of beautiful Manila shawls.

The contemporary market for Manila shawls is bifurcated between mass produced imports and artisanal Andalusian productions. Low cost imports, frequently manufactured in China from synthetic materials such as polyester, typically retail between 20 and 300 euros, with pricing determined by embroidery density. In contrast, authentic Andalusian Manila shawls predominantly produced in Seville from silk are positioned as premium cultural artifacts, with prices ranging from 300 to 2,000 euros. These silk varieties remain a significant component of Andalusian cultural heritage.

== See also ==
- Pañuelo
- Rebozo
- Mantilla
- Baro't saya
- Barong tagalog
- Guayabera
