= Pañuelo =

Filipino shawl

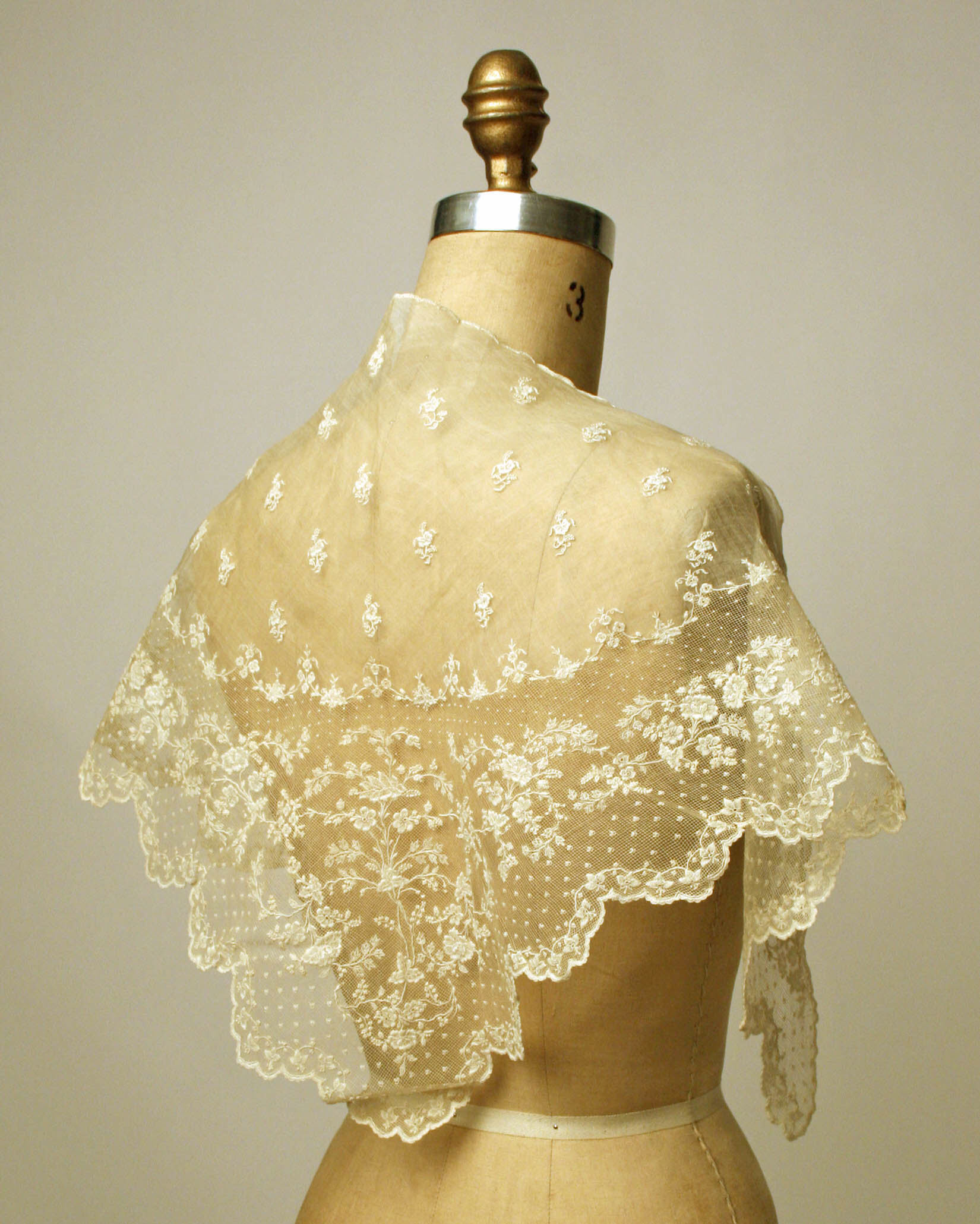
- Early 19th century pañuelo. Metropolitan Museum of Art
- Type: Kerchief, shawl
- Material: Piña fiber
- Place of origin: Philippines

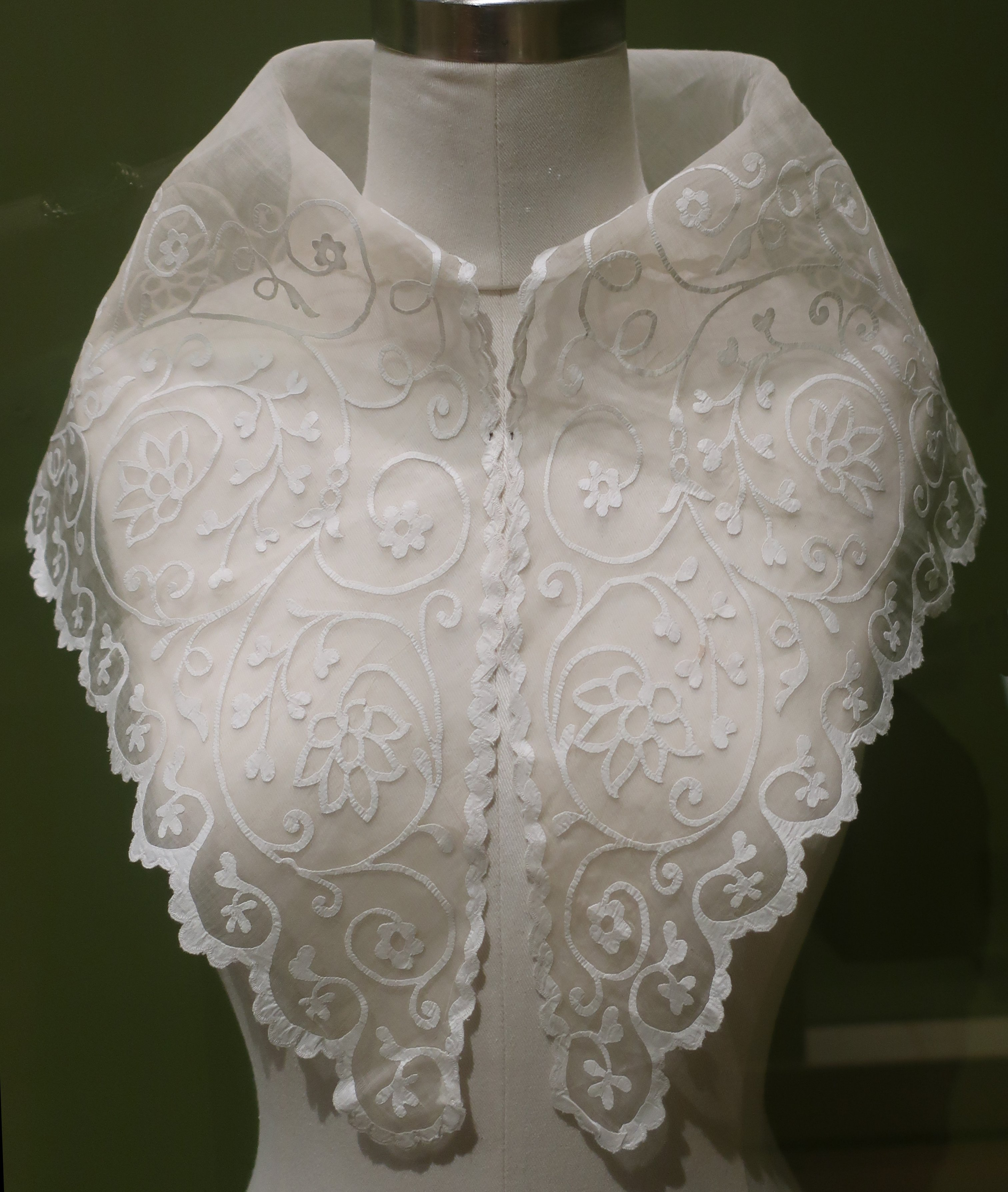
Early 20th century pañuelo made from embroidered piña fiber. Honolulu Museum of Art

The pañuelo or alampay is a Filipino lace-like embroidered neck scarf or shawl worn around the shoulders over the camisa (blouse). They were square-shaped and were folded in half into a triangle when worn. Pañuelos are the direct predecessors of the Manila shawl. The Spanish word pañuelo (from paño + -uelo) means kerchief, scarf, and handkerchief.

== Description ==
Pañuelos were traditionally made from sheer lace-like nipis textiles woven from abaca fiber. They were square-shaped and were folded in half into a triangle when worn around the shoulders. They commonly featured floral embroidery (using techniques like calado, sombrado, and deshilado). In addition to the native abacá fiber, they were also made from piña fiber, acquired from pineapples introduced by the Spanish. They also featured borders of lace or knotted fringes, a Spanish element which itself was acquired from the Moors.

They were an integral and distinctive part of the traditional baro't saya ensemble of Filipino commoners and the traje de mestiza ensemble of aristocratic Filipino women (along with the tapis and the abaniko fans), as they brought modesty to the relatively low neckline of the traditional camisa shirts. They were worn in the 18th and 19th centuries but are rarely used today in modern versions of the terno dress.

== History ==
Pañuelos were derived from traditional shawls in the pre-colonial Philippines known as alampay; head and neck coverings among pre-colonial Tagalog women. These were carried over into the Spanish colonial period and acquired European design motifs. They were also luxury goods exported via the Manila galleons to Nueva España and Europe; sometimes as gifts to royalty.

Pañuelos were copied by Chinese traders during the 18th and 19th centuries, and sold to the Philippines, Spain, and other Spanish colonies. These copies were made from silk with Chinese motif embroidery. They became immensely popular in the Philippines and were quickly adopted into the local fashions of upper class Luzon women. Similarly, they became widely sought-after luxury exports soon after they reached the Americas, where they became known as the mantón de Manila. They are believed to have influenced later designs of the rebozo of Latin America.

== Modern usage ==
Since the 1930s, pañuelos have been part of the modernized traje de mestiza. In modern days, pañuelo can still be seen worn with the modern terno; especially on older women. Pañuelo or alampay has also been an integral part of Iglesia ni Cristo church uniforms worn by deaconesses in all locale congregations in the Philippines. This white terno, called saya in Filipino, resembles its early deaconess uniforms worn during the 1930s. They can be decorated with embroidery or have simple designs.

== Gallery ==
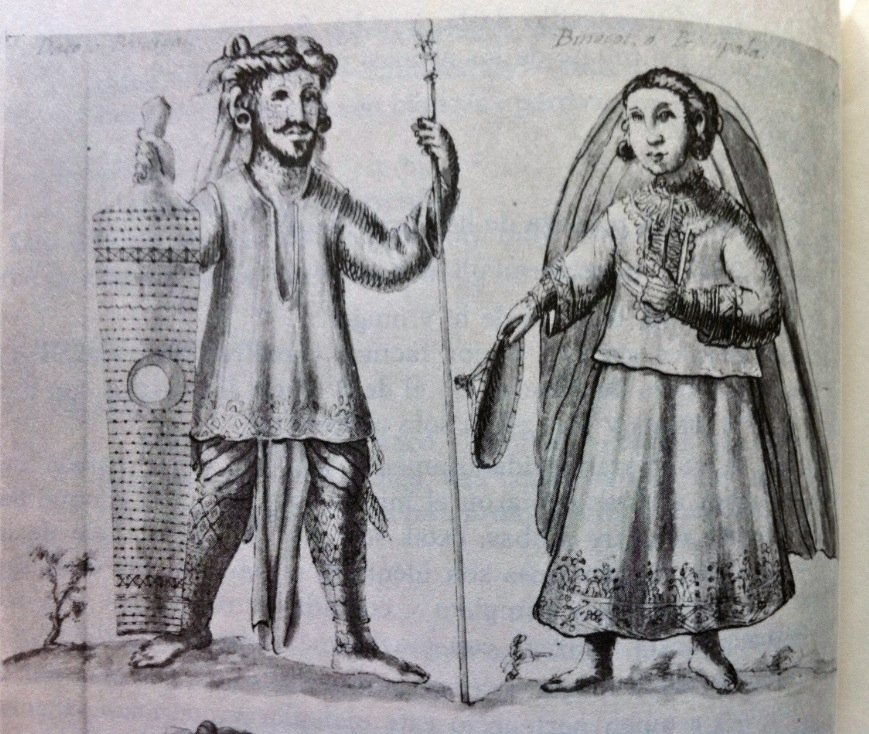
A 1668 illustration by Francisco Ignacio Alcina depicting a Visayan datu and a binukot noblewoman with a veil (alampay) and a salakot

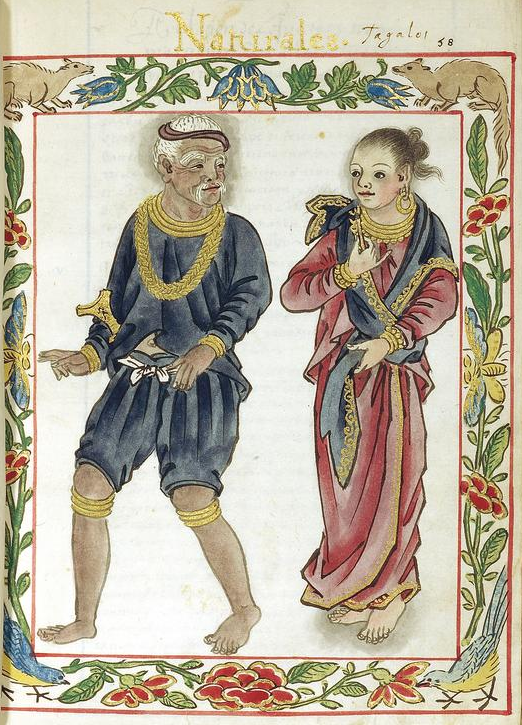
Tagalog couple from the Boxer Codex (c. 1590), the woman is wearing an alampay around her shoulders, the precursor to the pañuelo and the Manila shawl

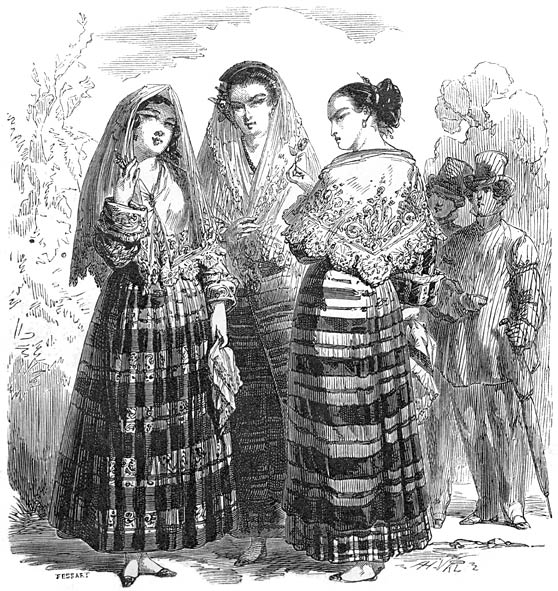
Filipina mestizas from the early 1800s with pañuelos over baro't saya, by Paul de la Gironiere

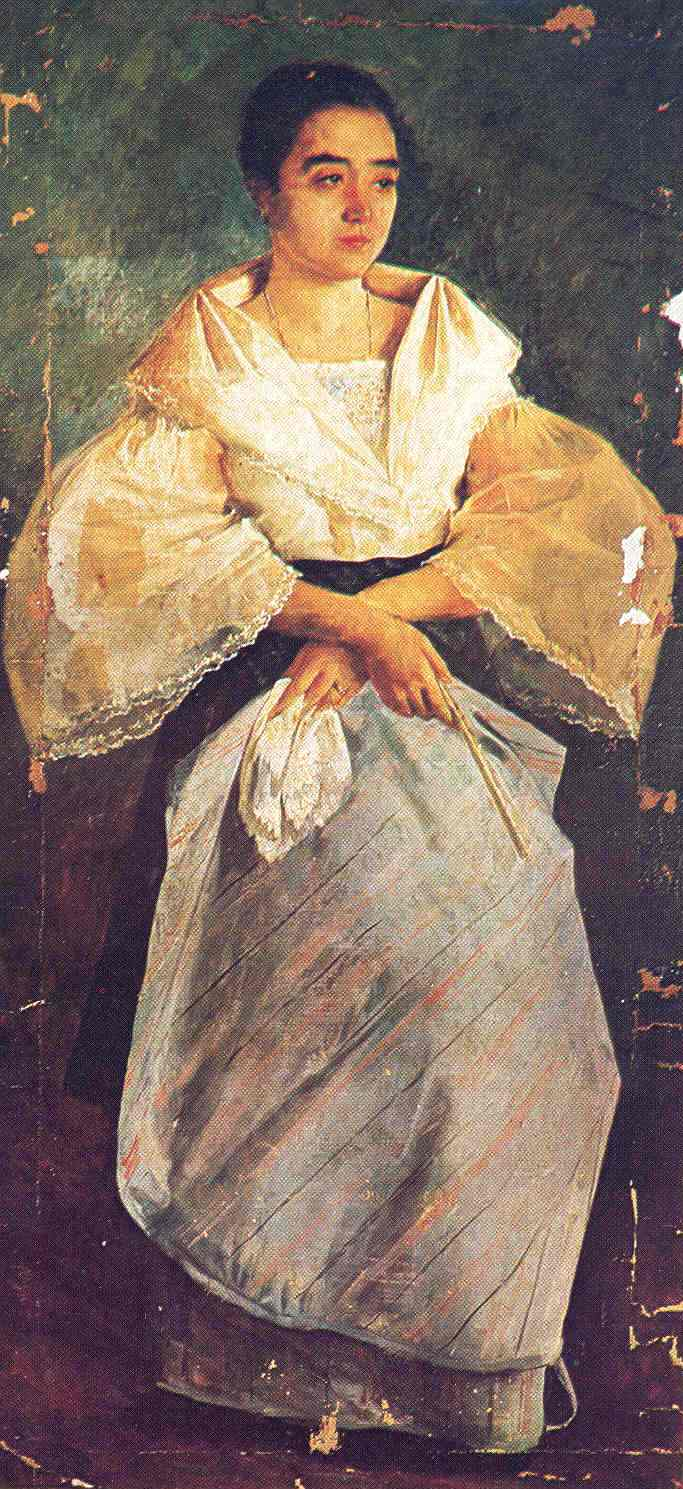
La Bulaqueña, an 1895 painting of a woman wearing a traje de mestiza with a pañuelo

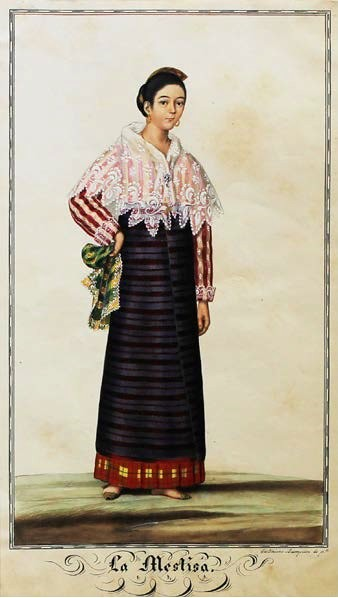
La Mestisa by Justiniano Asuncion (c. 1841), showing a woman in a striped baro't saya with a pañuelo

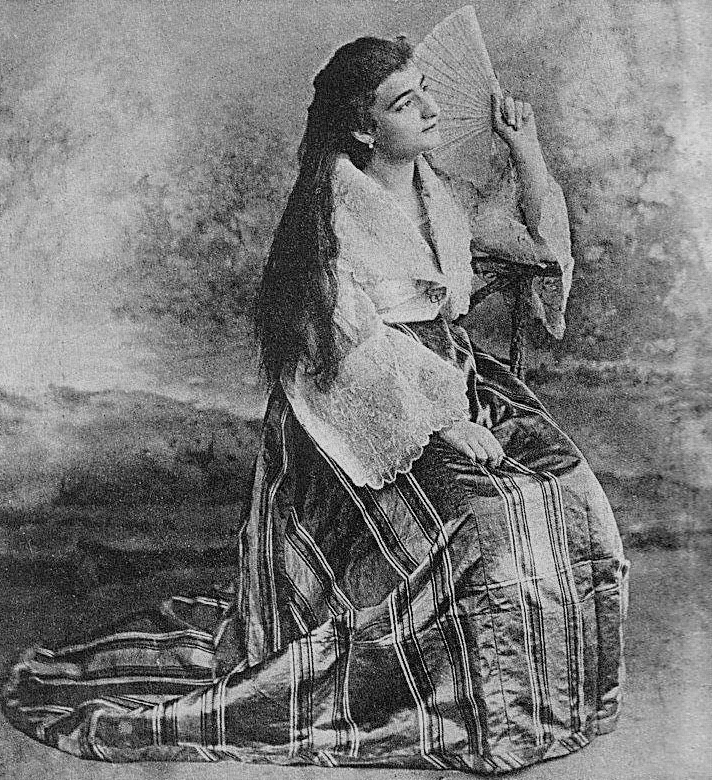
Woman in a traje de mestiza with a pañuelo and abanico folding fan (c. 1900)

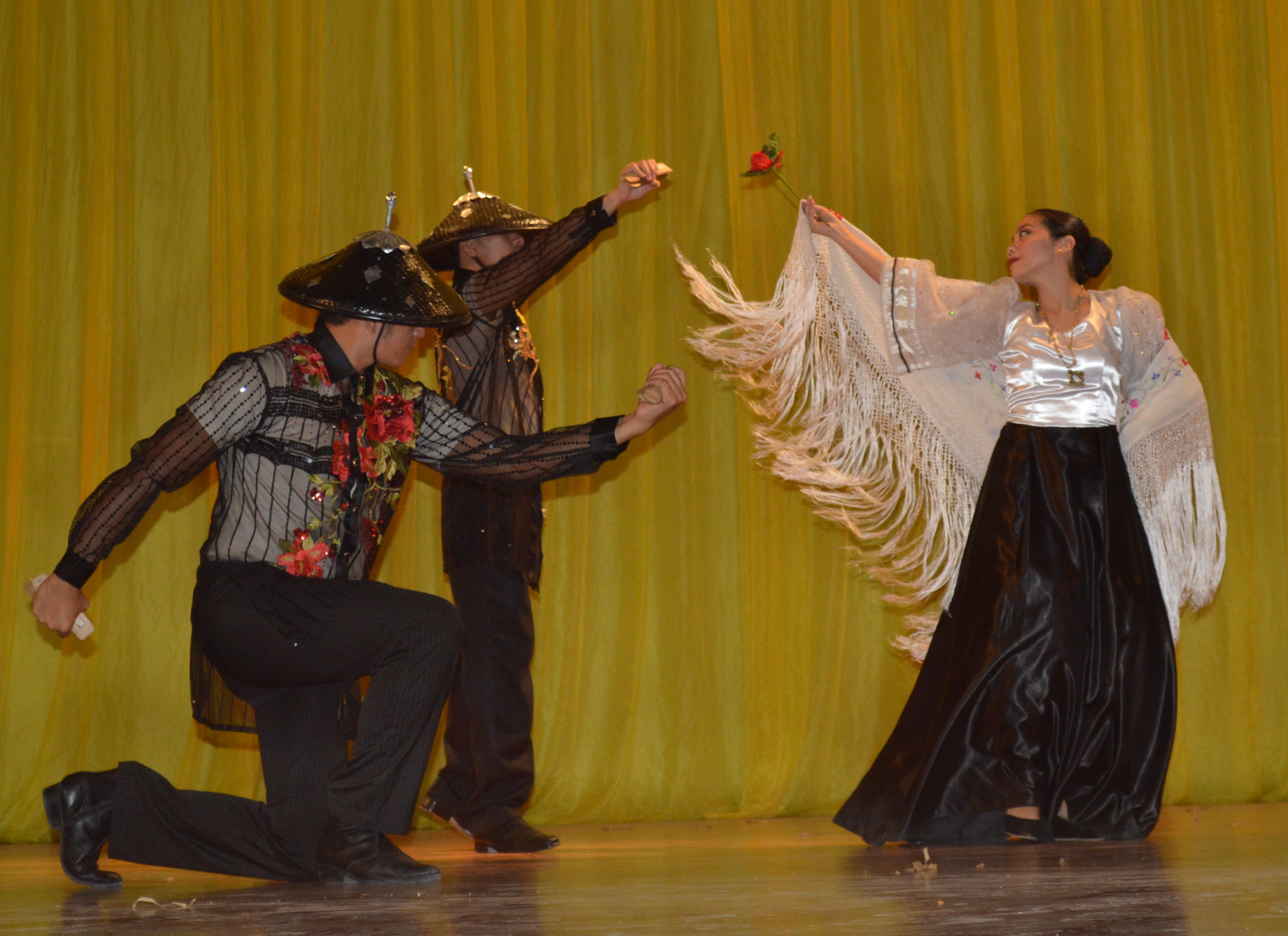
Dancers from the Philippines performing Jota Manileña. The woman is wearing a mantón de Manila over her traditional traje de mestiza dress

== See also ==
- Shawl
- Manila shawl
- Fichu
- Barong tagalog
