= Traje de flamenca =

Traditional clothing of flamenco dancers of Andalusia

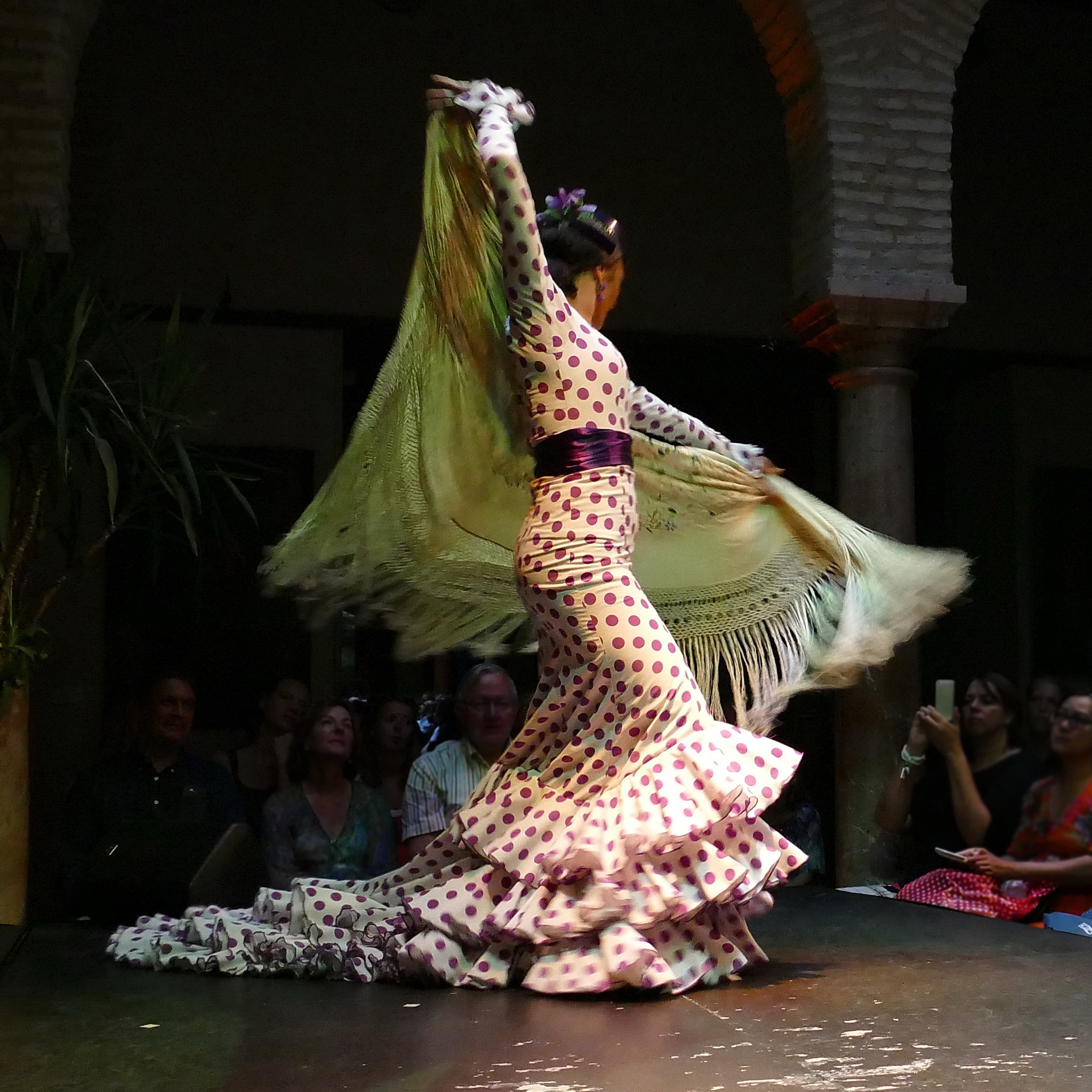
- Flamenco dancer wearing a traje de flamenca or traje de giana holding a Manila shawl
- Type: Dress
- Place of origin: Andalusia, Spain
- Introduced: 19th century

The traje de flamenca ("flamenco outfit") or traje de gitana ("Gitana outfit") is the dress traditionally worn by women at Ferias (festivals) in Andalusia, Spain. There are two forms: one worn by dancers and the other worn as a day dress.

The day dress is body-hugging to mid-thigh, and then continues in multiple layers of ruffles to the ankle. Modern interpretations of the style are difficult to walk in, let alone dance. The dancers' version therefore flares out from higher on the hip to allow freedom of movement.

Both versions are trimmed with layers of ruffles on both the skirt and sleeves. The dress is typically brightly colored, usually in black, red or and may be either plain or patterned, with the most famous being the polka dotted traje de lunares.

Traditionally, the outfit is completed with a shawl (mantón de Manila) worn over the shoulders. The traditional dancer will also wear her hair in a bun adorned with flowers, and perhaps a decorative hair comb.

The outfit was attributed to the Gitanos (Roma people of Spain), but is now generally thought of as typically Andalusia. The outfit originated in the late 19th and early 20th centuries when women vendors dressed in modest calico gowns trimmed with ruffles came to the fairs along with livestock traders. In time, women of the propertied classes copied these outfits. Ever since the Seville Exposition of 1929, the traje de flamenca has had a status as the official outfit of the event.

== Fashion ==
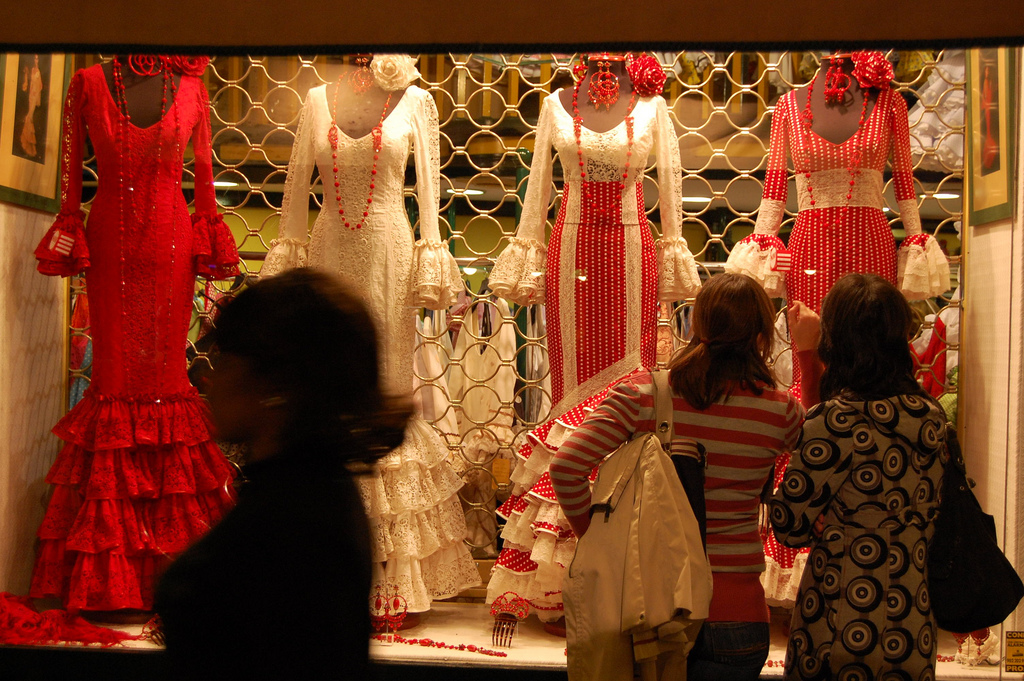
Shop of trajes de flamenca in Seville.

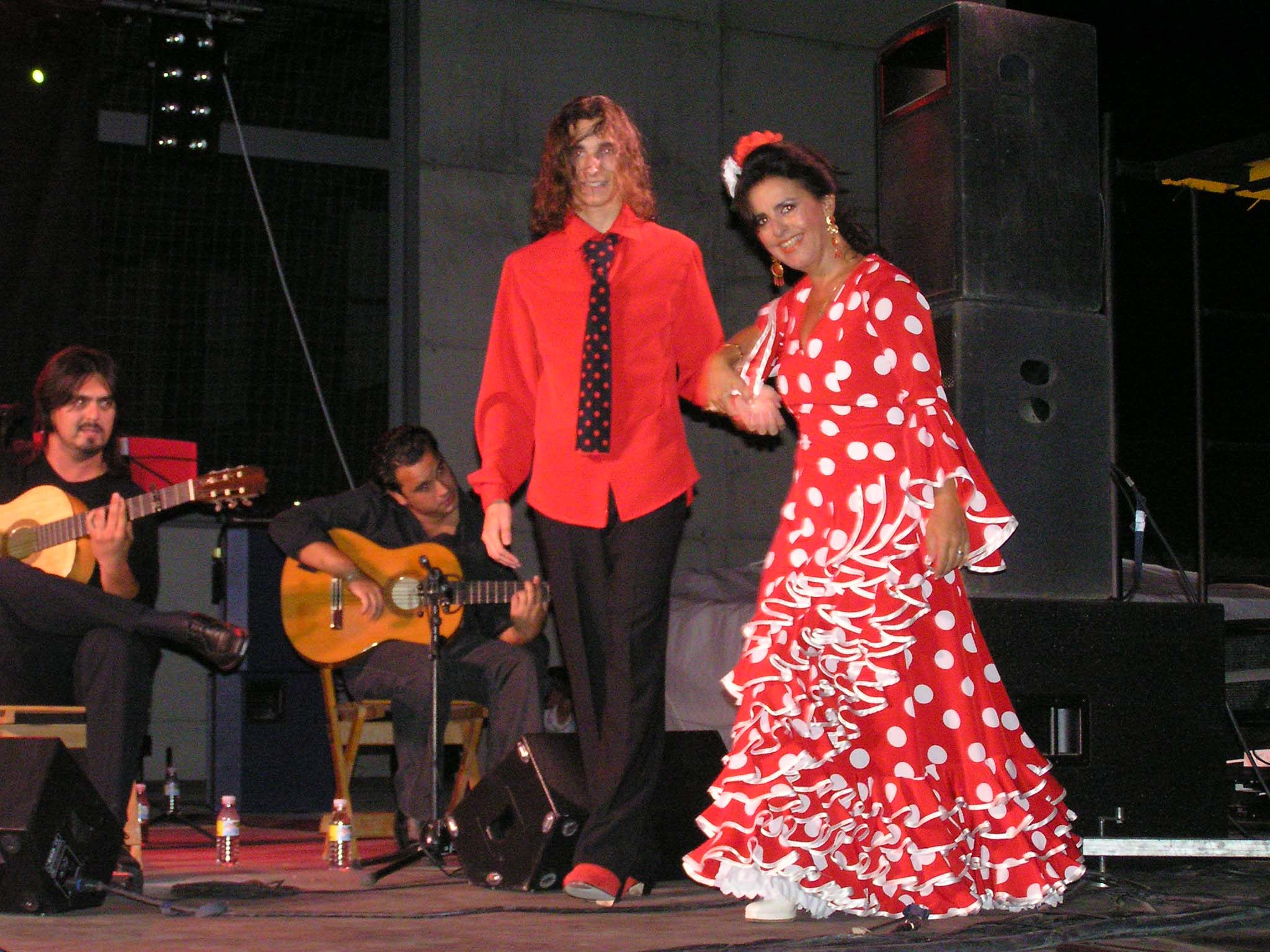
Dancer in the typical traje de lunares.

The traje de flamenca has undergone changes over the century or more that it has been in widespread use. For example, in the 1960s and '70s, the skirts became shorter, with skirts reaching only to the middle of the calf or even to the knee (the so-called Marisol style). Beginning in the 1970s, the frogs are dropped back to the ankle so that they are not distracting on the legs.

Madonna wore a flamenco dress in the video for her 1987 signature song La Isla Bonita. This was her first song to have a Latino influence and was a tribute to the beauty of the Latin people according to Madonna. Following its release, the video achieved worldwide popularity, and the flamenco red dress she wore became a trend later.

In the early 21st century there are a wide variety of designs of traje de flamenca for women and girls. They come in a variety of colors, plain or patterned, with short or long sleeves, and more or fewer ruffles. This folkloric outfit has inspired numerous Spanish and international fashion designers, among them Victorio & Lucchino, who have their own line of trajes de flamenca. Others who have been influenced include Yves Saint Laurent, John Galliano, Valentino Garavani, and Tom Ford.

New designs in trajes de flamenca are shown annually at the Salón Internacional de la Moda Flamenca (SIMOF), which celebrated its 30th year in 2025. The event takes place at the start of the year in Seville. In 2026, approximately 120 brands and designers showed over 1,500 different outfits; these were displayed across 52 fashion shows featuring a mix of individual, collective and territorial collections.
