= Piña =

Philippine fiber made from the pineapple plant

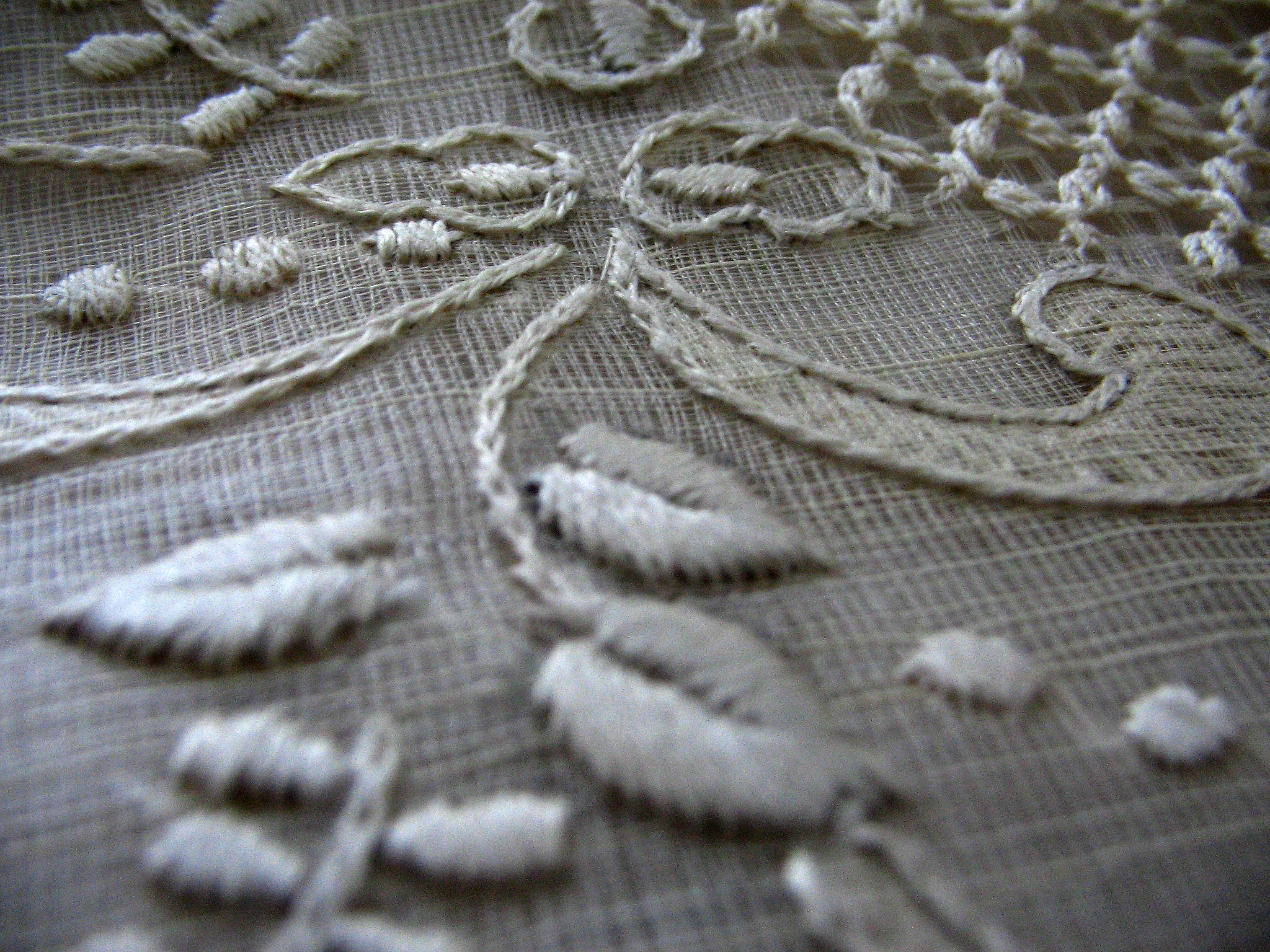
- Close-up view of the embroidery on a barong tagalog made with piña fiber
- Type: Fiber
- Material: Pineapple leaf
- Production process: Craft production
- Place of origin: Philippines
- Introduced: 17th century

Aklan piña handloom weaving
- UNESCO Intangible Cultural Heritage
- Country: Philippines
- Reference: 01564
- Region: Asia and the Pacific

Inscription history
- Inscription: 2023 (18th session)
- List: Representative

Piña (Tagalog pronunciation: [pɪˈnja] pi-NYAH) is a traditional Philippine fiber made from the leaves of the pineapple plant. Pineapples are indigenous to South America but have been widely cultivated in the Philippines since the 17th century, and used for weaving lustrous lace-like luxury textiles known as nipis fabric. The name is derived from Spanish piña, meaning "pineapple".

== History ==
Pineapples were introduced by the Spanish to the Philippines during the Spanish colonial era. The cultivar now known as 'Red Spanish' began to be cultivated for the textile industry as early as the 17th century. The extraction and weaving techniques were direct adaptations of the native weaving traditions using abacá fiber, which has a similar texture. Piña were woven into lustrous lace-like nipis fabrics usually decorated with intricate floral embroidery known as calado and sombrado.

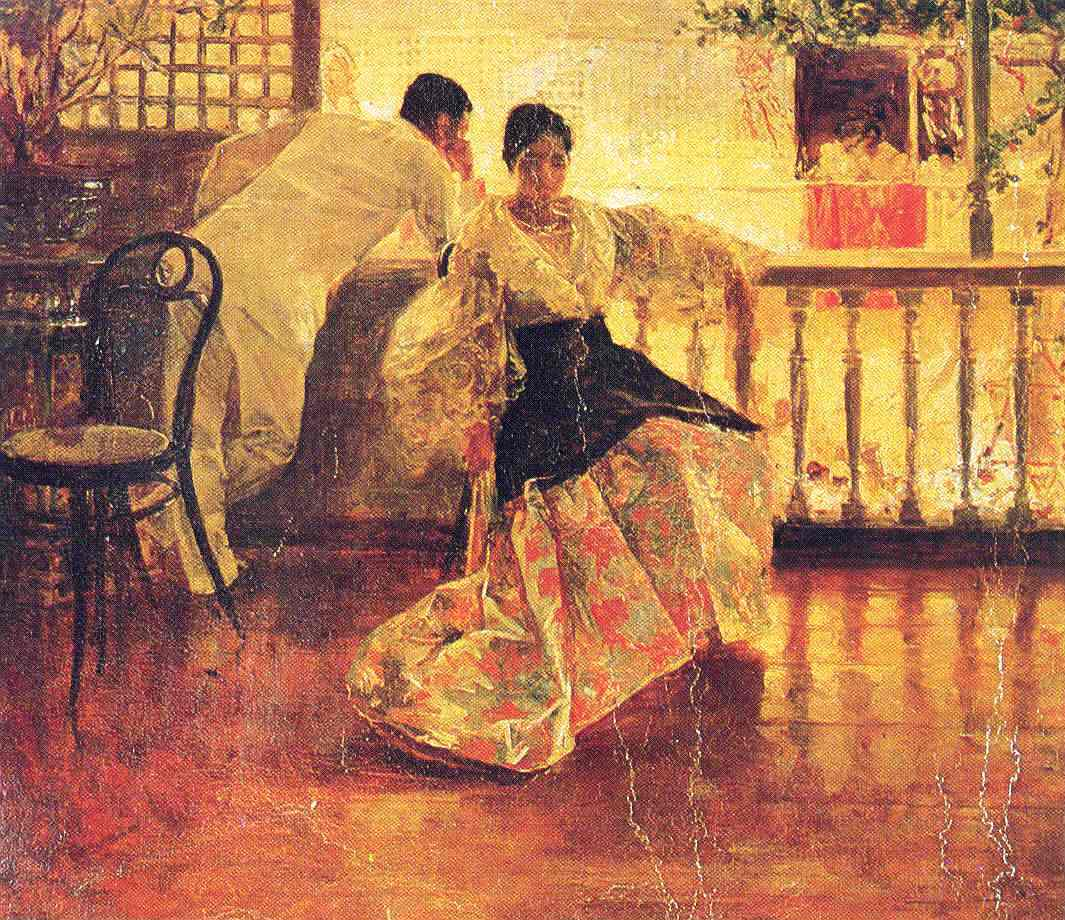
Tampuhan, an 1895 painting by Juan Luna of a Filipina in traditional traje de mestiza dress, which was largely made from piña

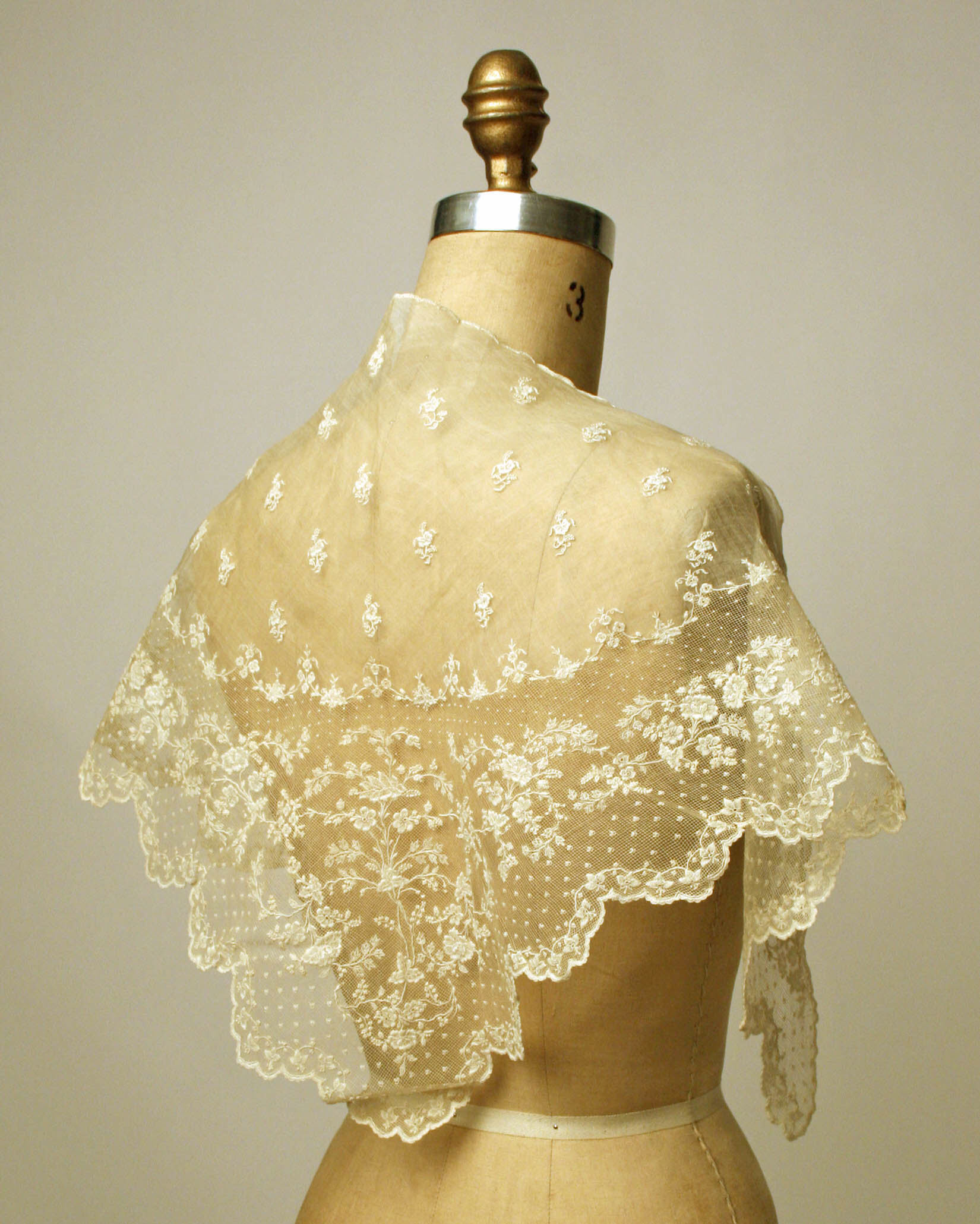
Early-19th-century pañuelo in the Metropolitan Museum of Art made from piña and linen

Piña fabric was a luxury export from the Philippines during the Spanish colonial period and gained favor among European aristocrats in the 18th and 19th centuries. Nipis fabrics were esteemed as exotic and sumptuous. Notable uses by royalty include the baptismal gown of King Alfonso XIII presented as a gift by Pope Pius X (now in the Museo del Traje); a piña handkerchief given as a wedding gift to Princess Alexandra of Denmark on her marriage to King Edward VII; as well as a petticoat and undergarment for Queen Victoria. An unfinished Maria Clara gown was also commissioned by the Marquis of Yriarte (then Governor of Laguna) intended for Queen Isabella II, who abdicated in 1870. Numerous examples of 19th century embroidered piña textiles are in the collections of various museums around the world, although their history remains understudied in academic literature. Examples of pieces with motifs representing scenes of Philippine lives and culture were available as souvenirs for travelers around the turn of the 19th to 20th century.

Domestically, they were used to make the traditional barong tagalog, baro't saya, and traje de mestiza clothing of the Filipino upper class, as well as women's pañuelos. They were favored for their light and breezy quality, which was ideal in the hot tropical climate of the islands. The industry was largely destroyed as a result of the Japanese occupation in the Second World War, and has been the subject of revival efforts since the 1960s.

Numerous pineapple-based dishes were also developed in the Philippines as a result of the pineapple textile industry. These include traditional ingredients and dishes like pineapple vinegar, hamonado, afritada, and pininyahang manok. Another notable by-product is a traditional jelly-like dessert called nata de piña, which has been produced in the Philippines since the 18th century.

== Production methods ==
Since piña is from a leaf, the leaf has to be cut first from the plant. Then the fiber is pulled or split away from the leaf. Most leaf fibers are long and somewhat stiff. Each strand of the piña fiber is hand scraped and is knotted one by one to form a continuous filament to be handwoven and then made into a piña cloth.

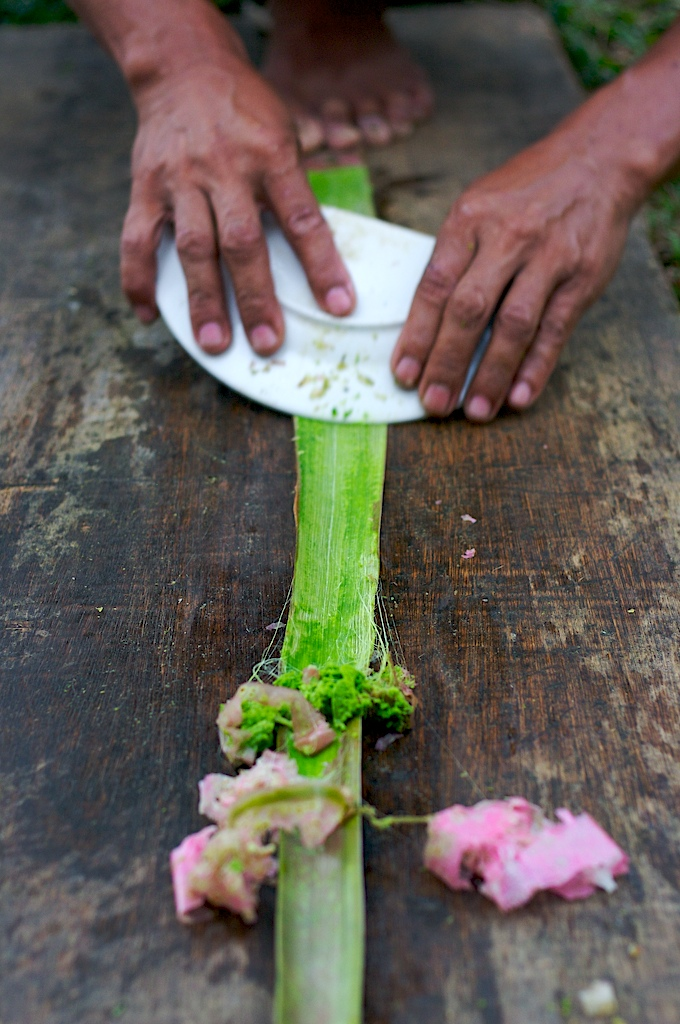
Scraping a pineapple leaf to reveal the fibers

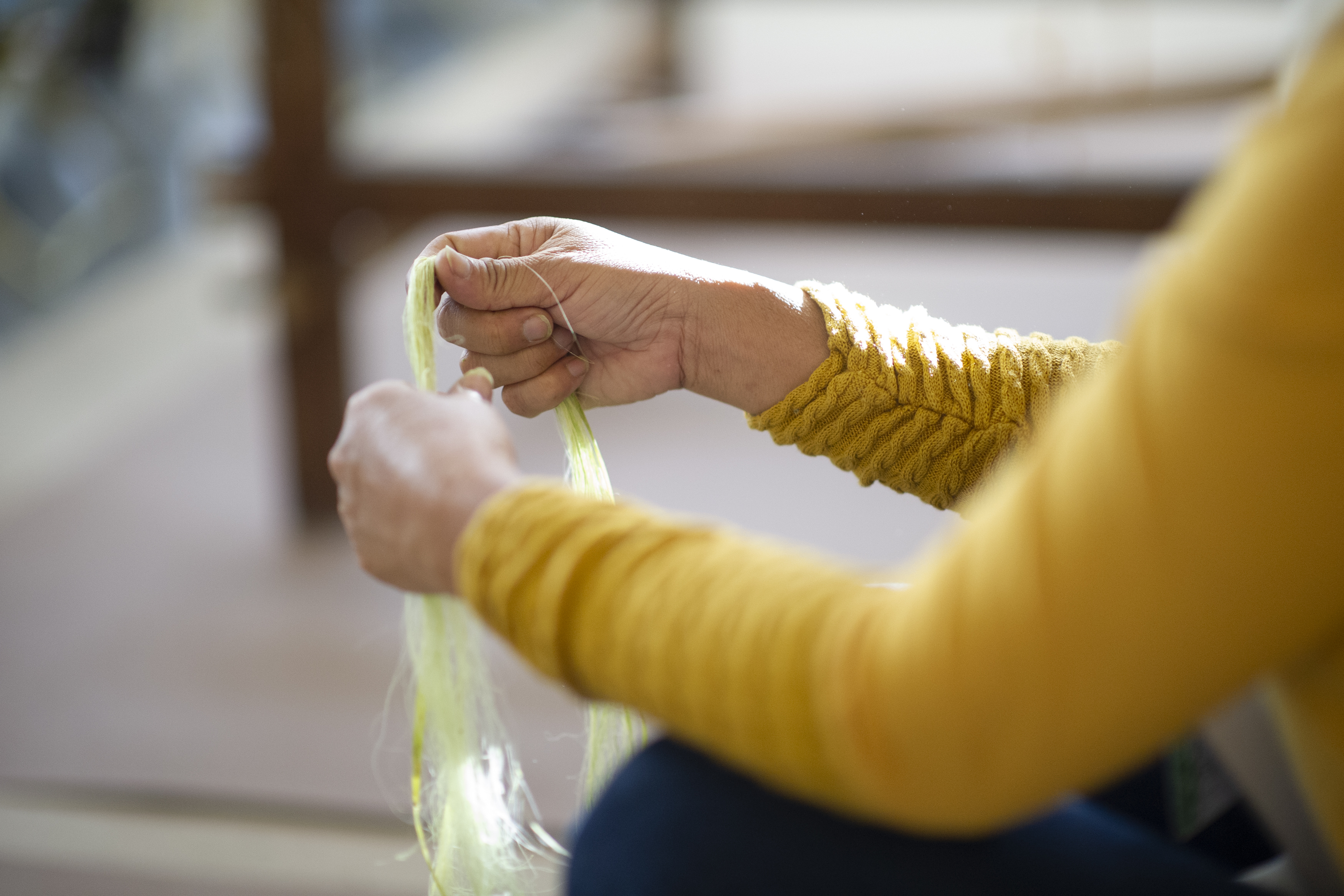
Preparing fibres for weaving

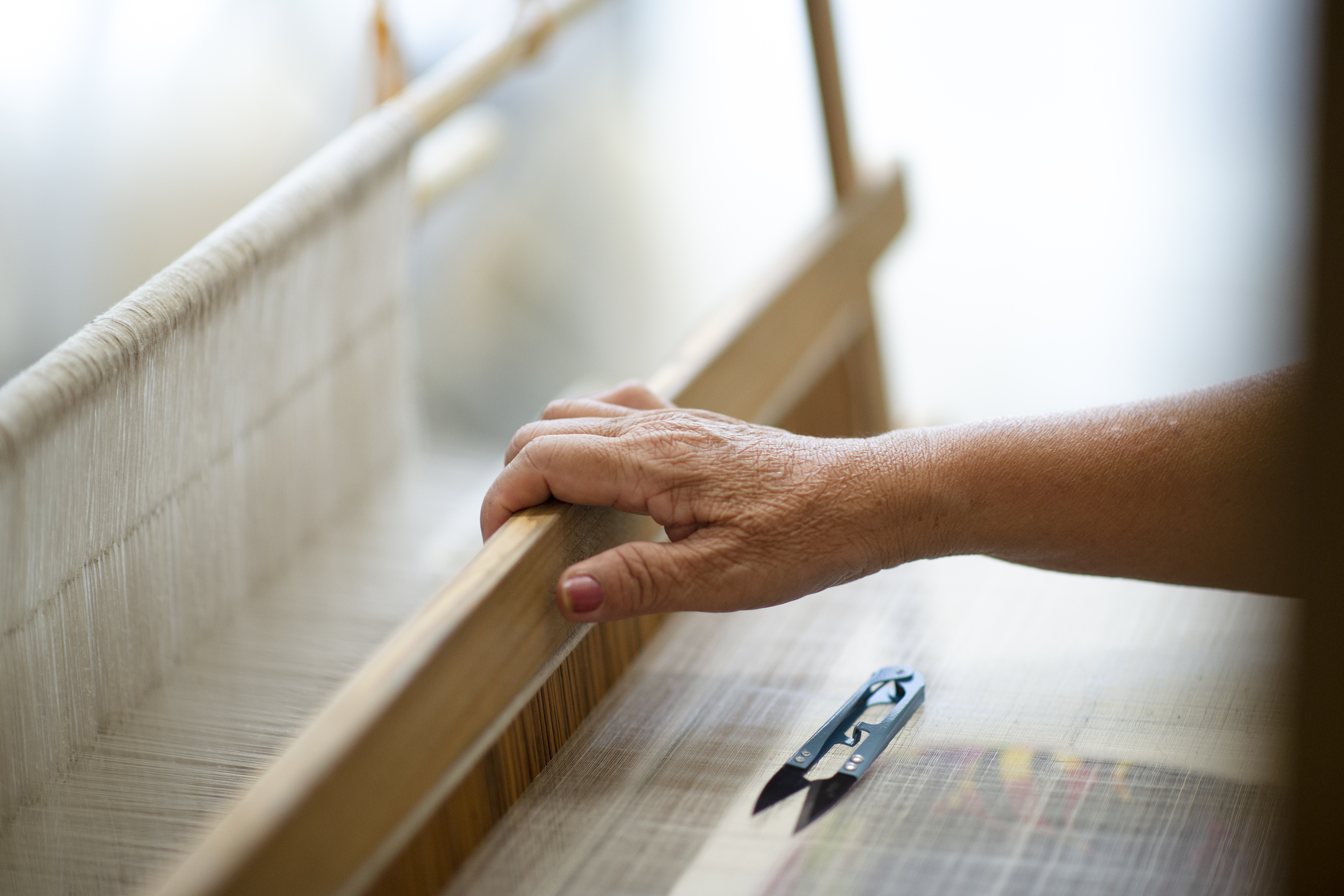
Traditional piña weaving

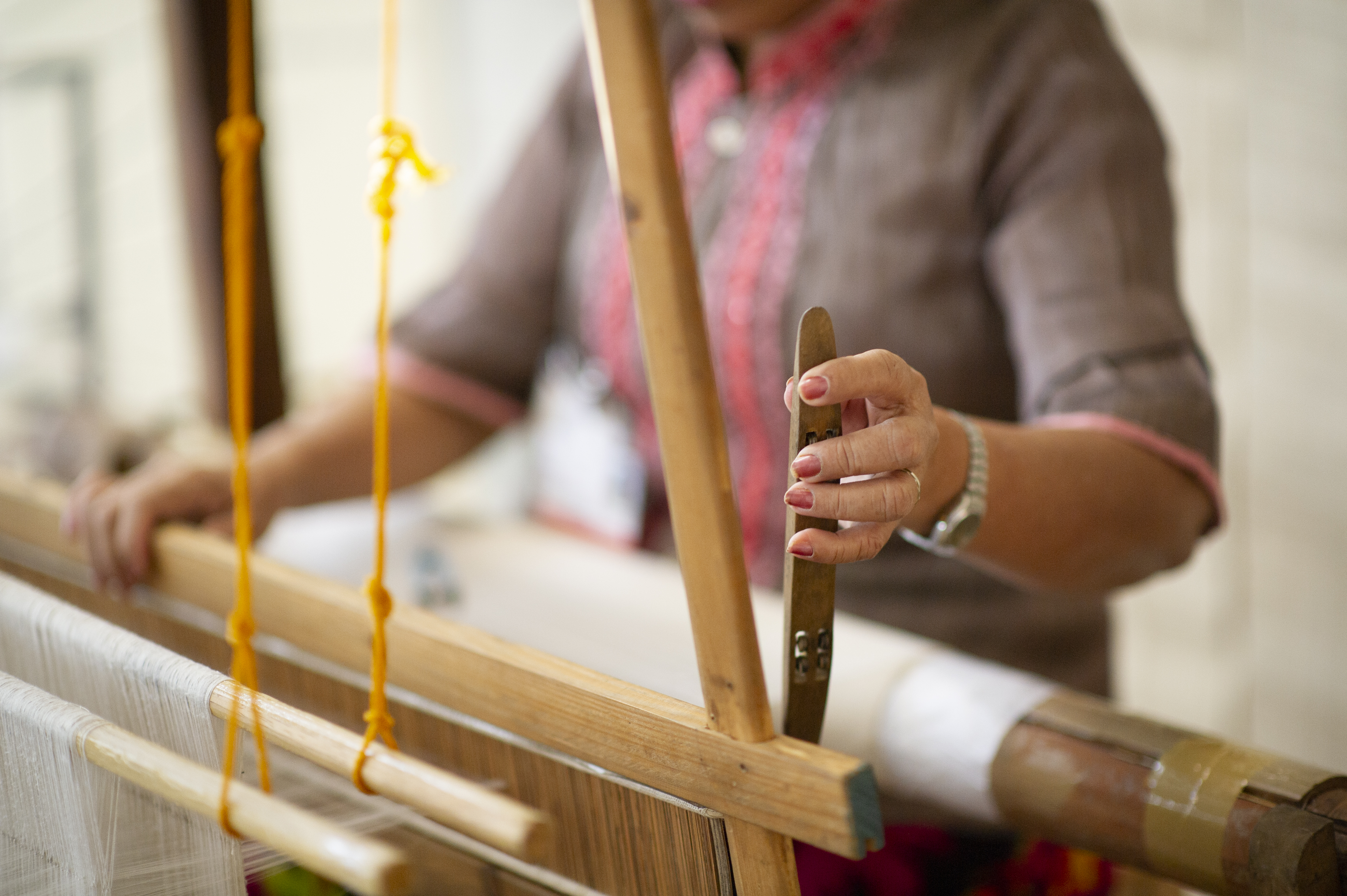
Traditional piña weaving

== Producers ==
Kalibo, Aklan, is the main and the oldest manufacturer/weaver of piña cloth in the Philippines which are being exported to various parts of the world most particularly North America and Europe. Piña weaving is an age-old tradition which was recently revived in the past 20 years.

Pineapple silk was considered the queen of Philippine fabrics and is considered the fabric of choice of the Philippine elite. During the 1996 APEC summit held in the Philippines, world leaders donned barong tagalog made of piña sourced from Kalibo during the group photo.

Producers include La Herminia Piña Weaving Industry, Malabon Pina Producers and Weavers Association, Reycon's Piña Cloth and Industry, and Rurungan sa Tubod Foundation.

== Uses ==
Piña fabric is characterized by being lightweight but stiff, with a sheer appearance and a smooth silk-like texture. In modern times, it is predominantly used in the making of barong tagalog, baro't saya, and other traditional formal wear in the Philippines. It is also used for table linens, bags, mats and other clothing items.

== UNESCO recognition ==
Piña handloom weaving was nominated to UNESCO's Intangible Cultural Heritage List in 2023. The decision was made at the 18th Intergovernmental Committee for the Safeguarding of the Intangible Cultural Heritage meeting held in Kasane, Botswana, on 5–8 December 2023.

== Gallery ==
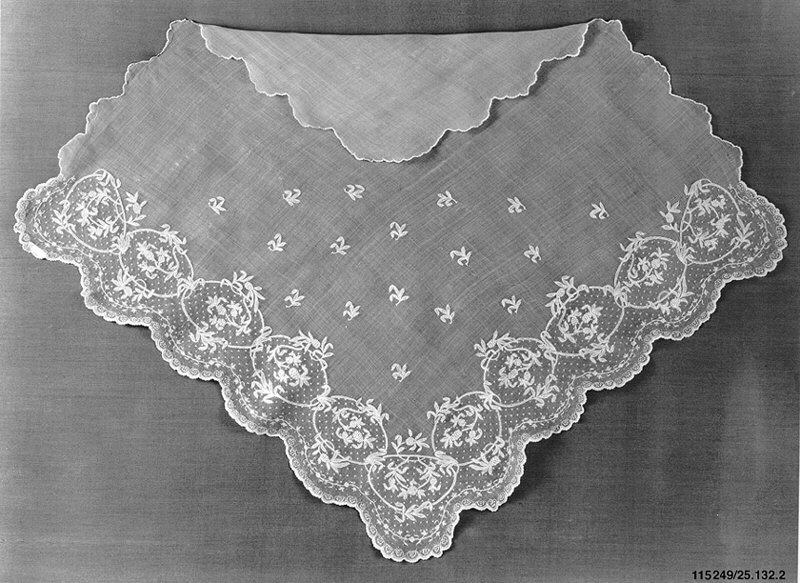
Early 19th century pañuelo in the Metropolitan Museum of Art made from piña and linen

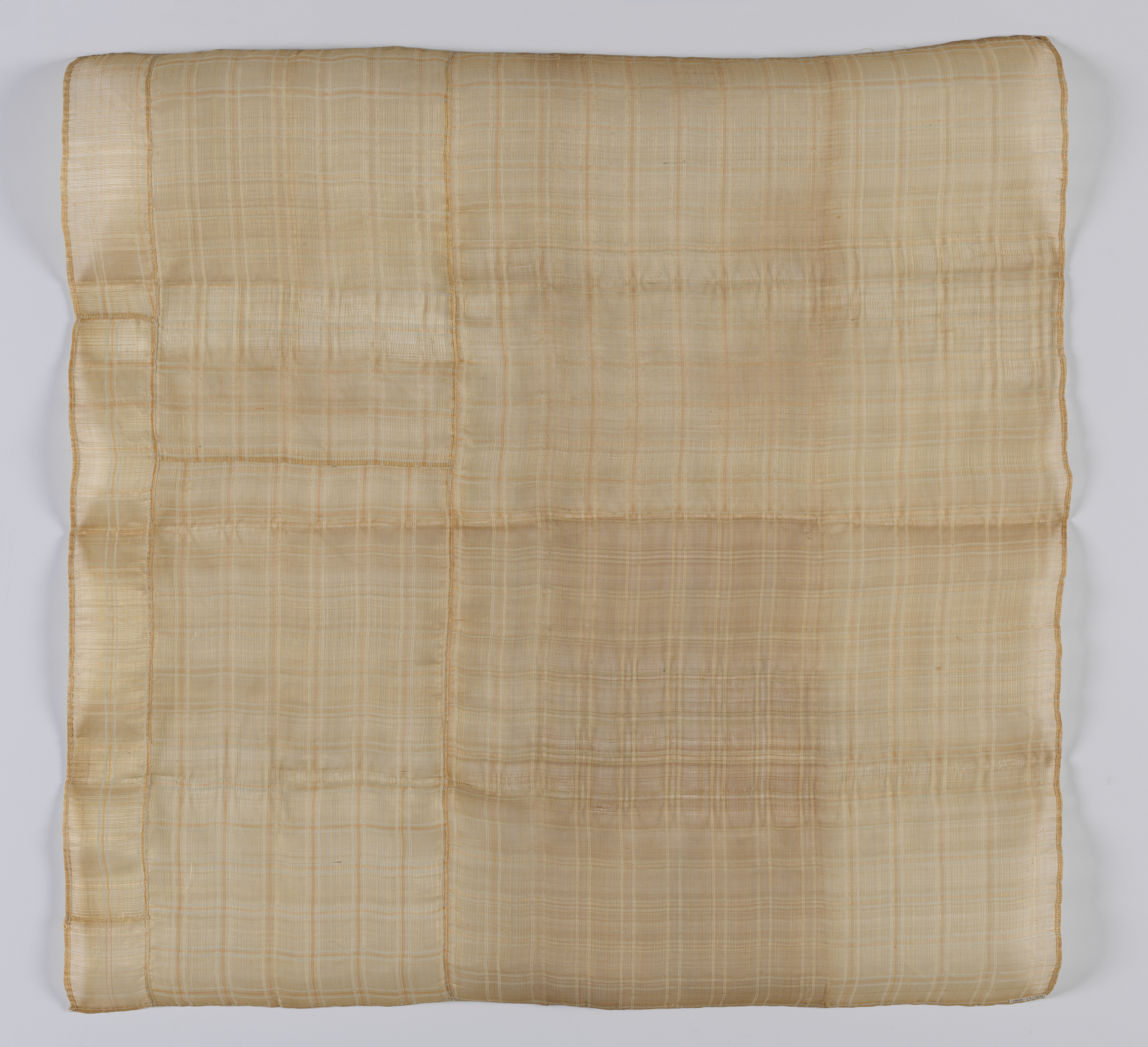
19th century cotton and piña textile in the Cooper Hewitt, Smithsonian Design Museum

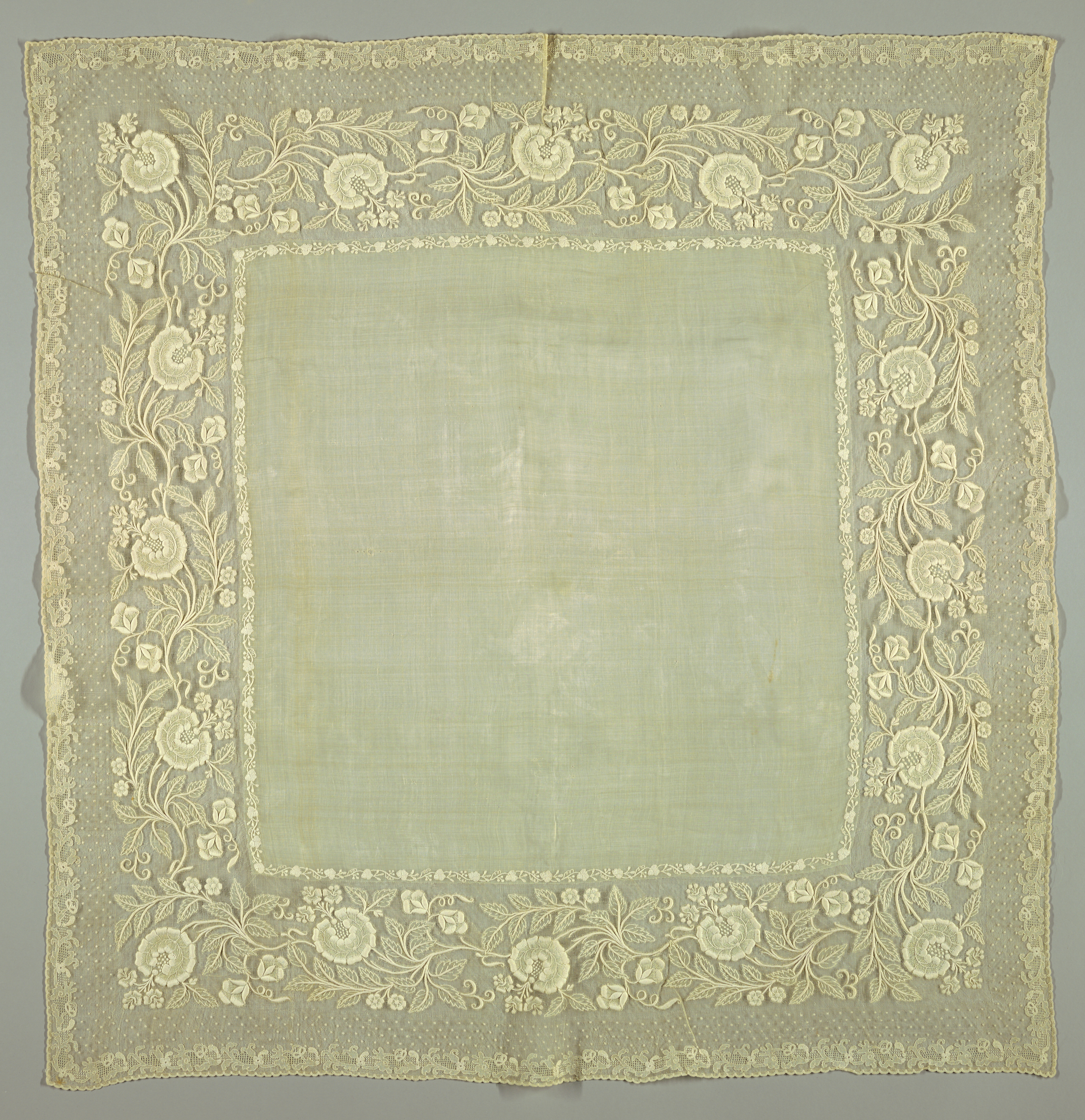
19th century handkerchief made from piña with cotton embroidery

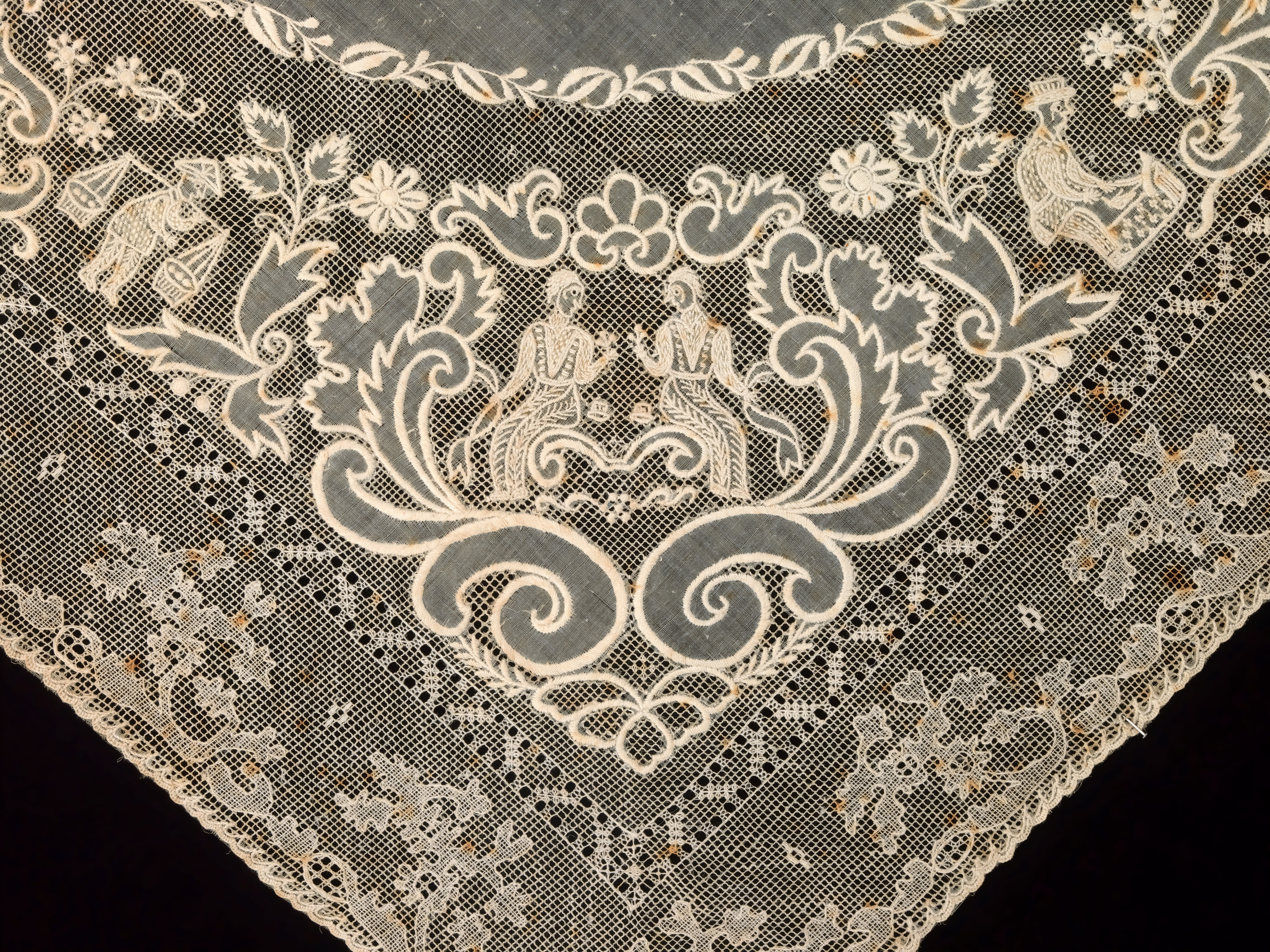
Handkerchief embroidery detail of cultural scenes

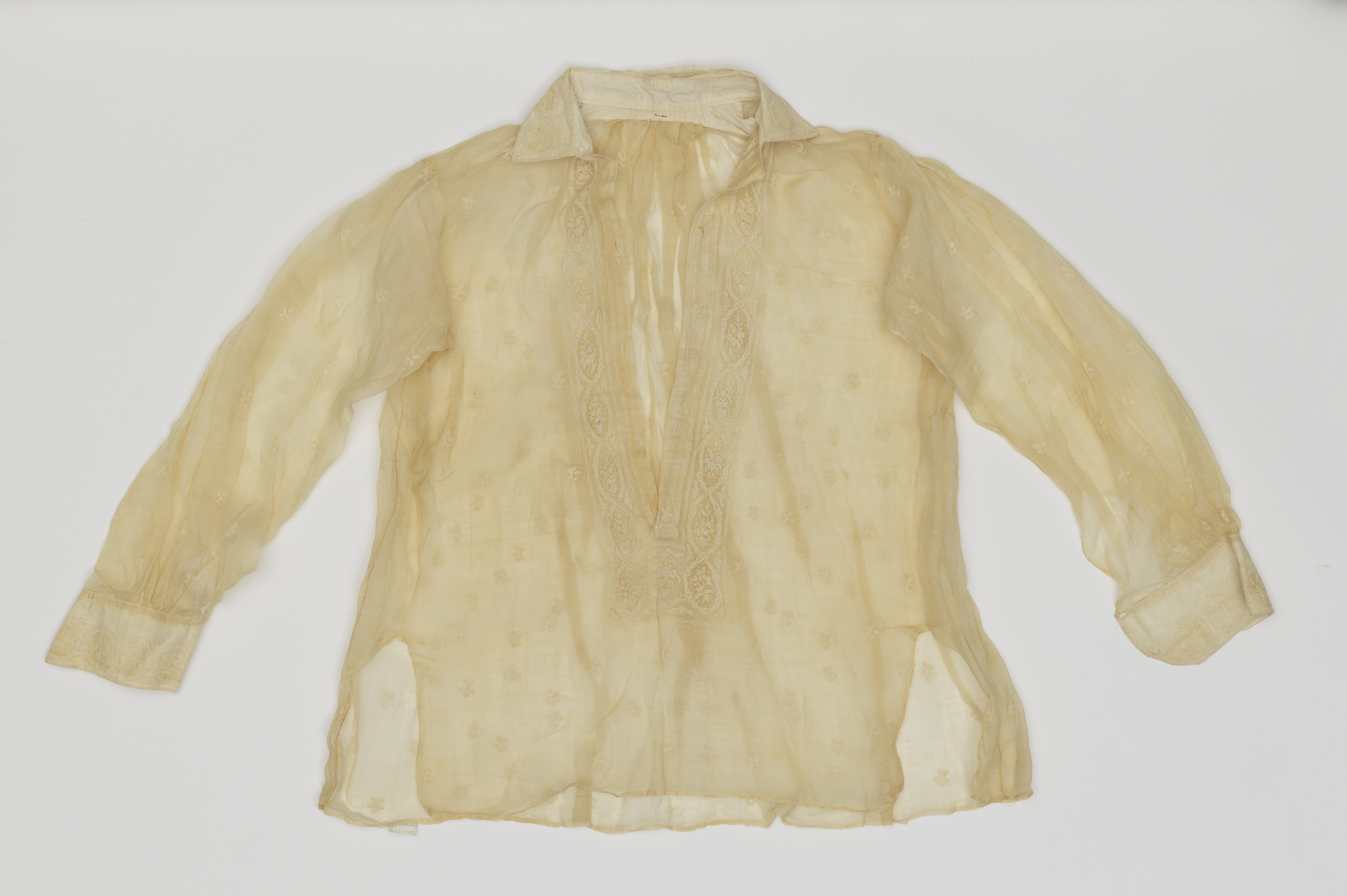
19th century barong tagalog made from piña and cotton

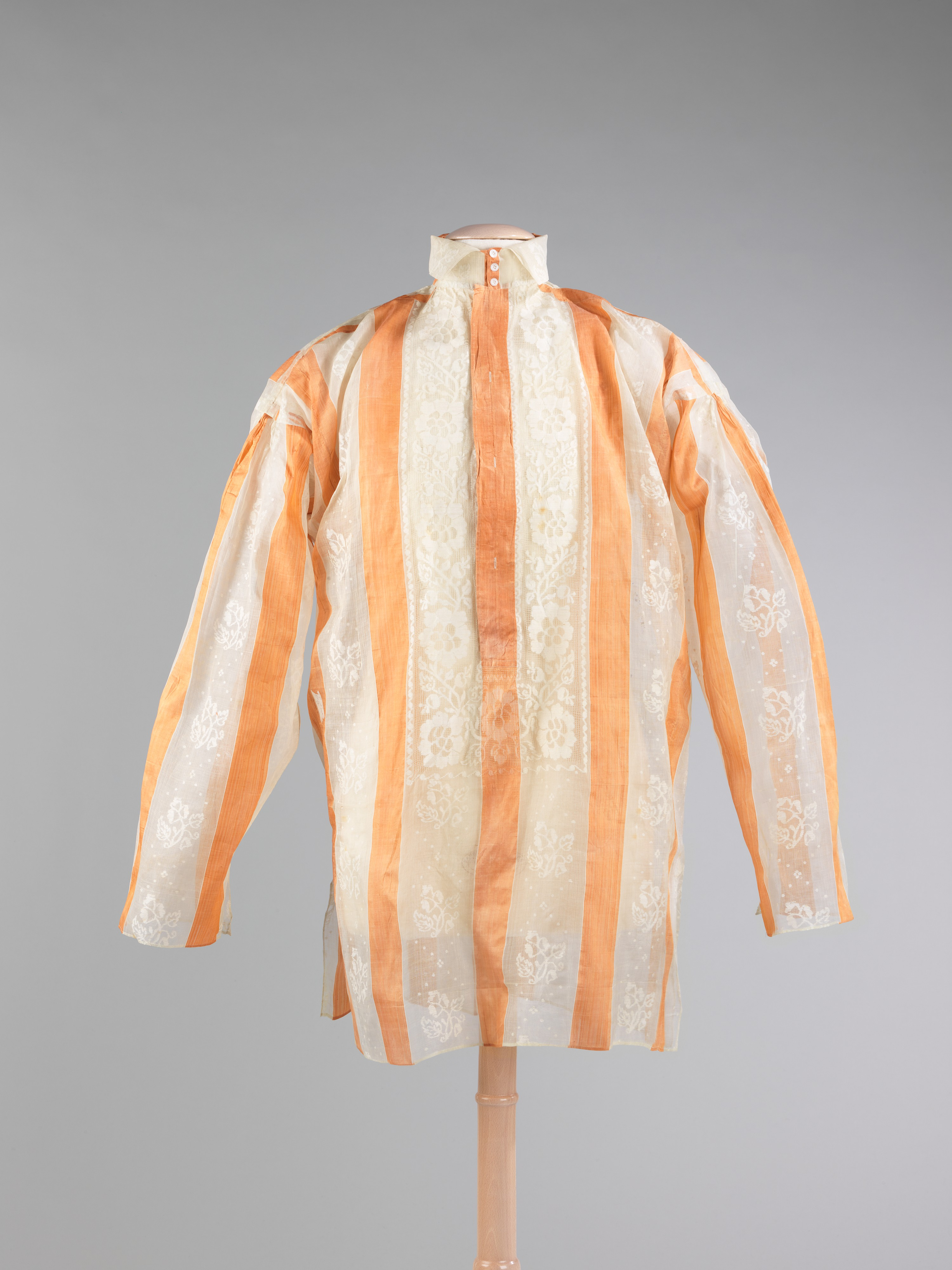
Early 19th century striped barong tagalog made from piña

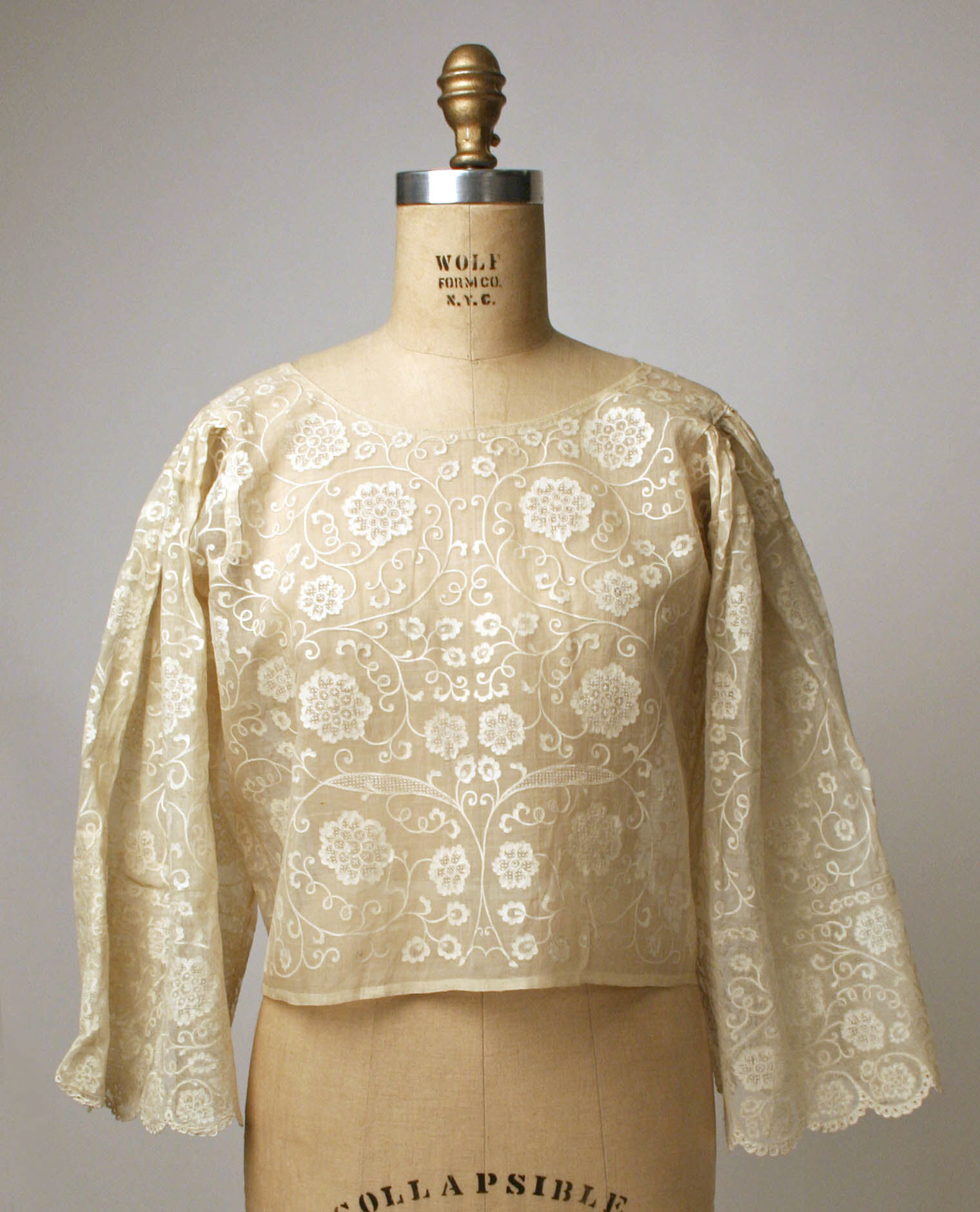
Early 19th century camisa (women's blouse) made from piña and cotton

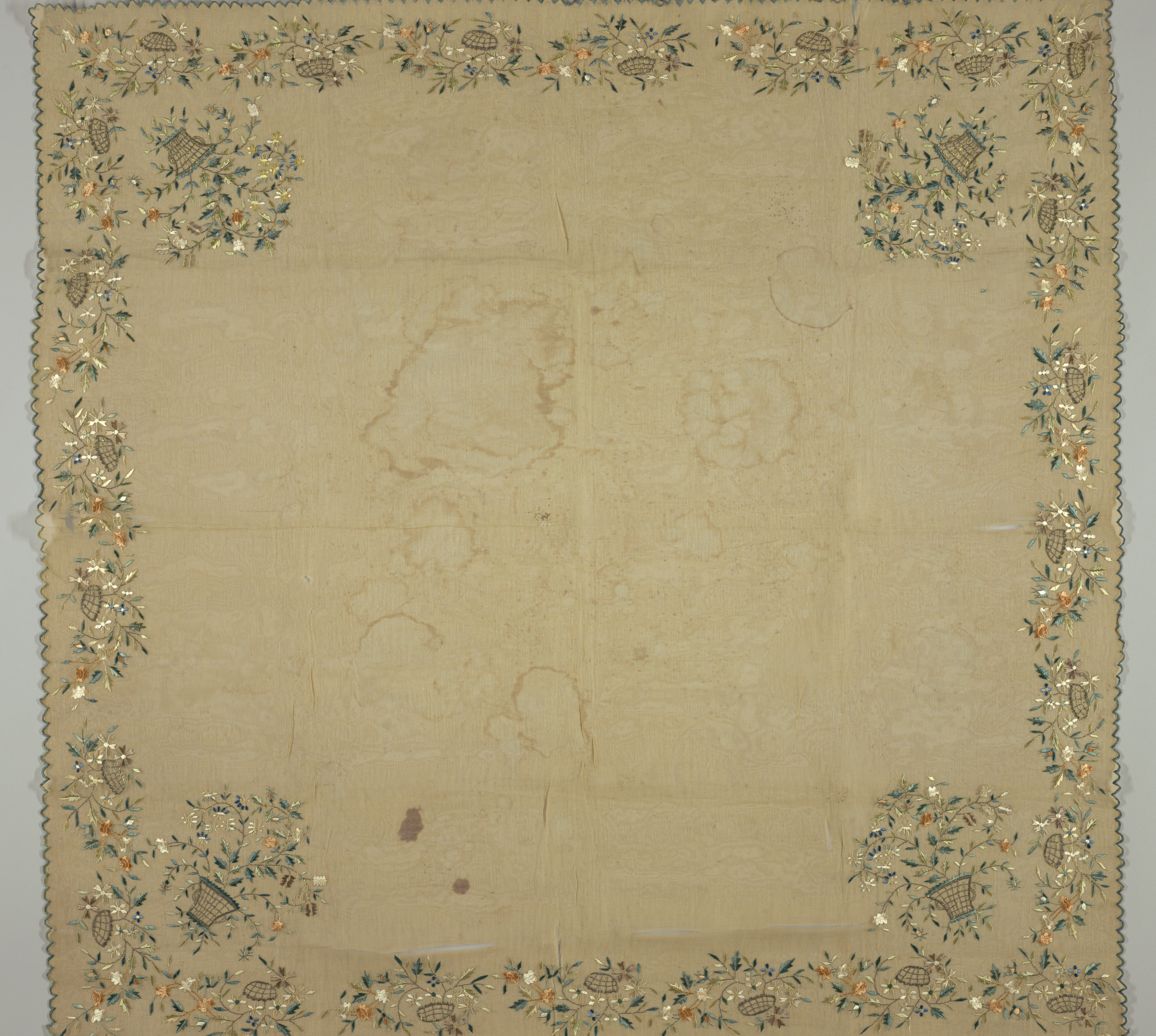
19th century pañuelo with silk and silver thread embroidery

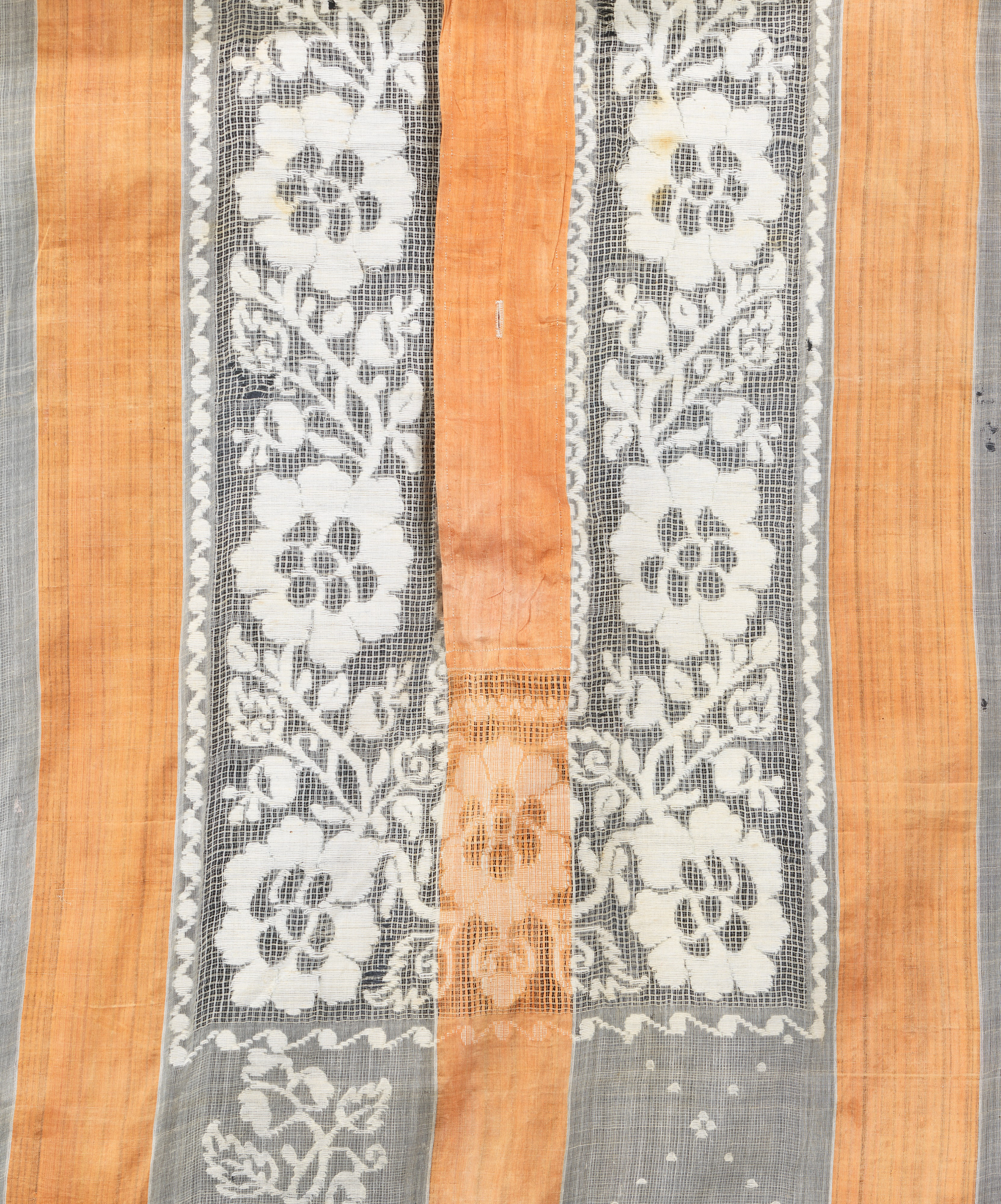
Mid-19th century piña barong tagalog with patterns

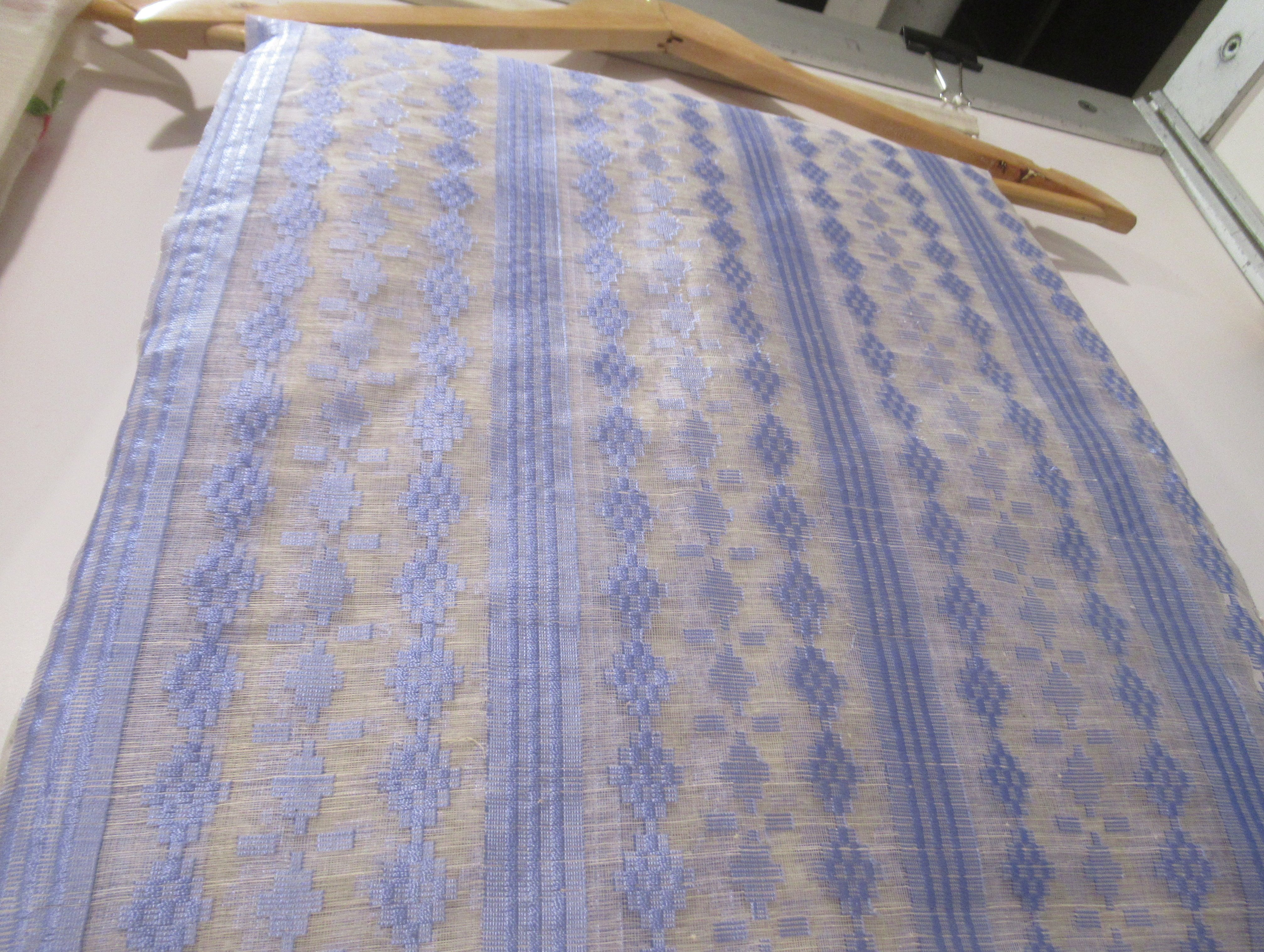
Heritage $1,160 Raquel Eliserio natural Aklan Piña fibre

== See also ==
- Abacá
- Hablon
- Batik
- Inabel
- Malong
- Nata de piña
- Piñatex
- Tapis
- T'nalak
