= Hablon =

Philippine handwoven textile

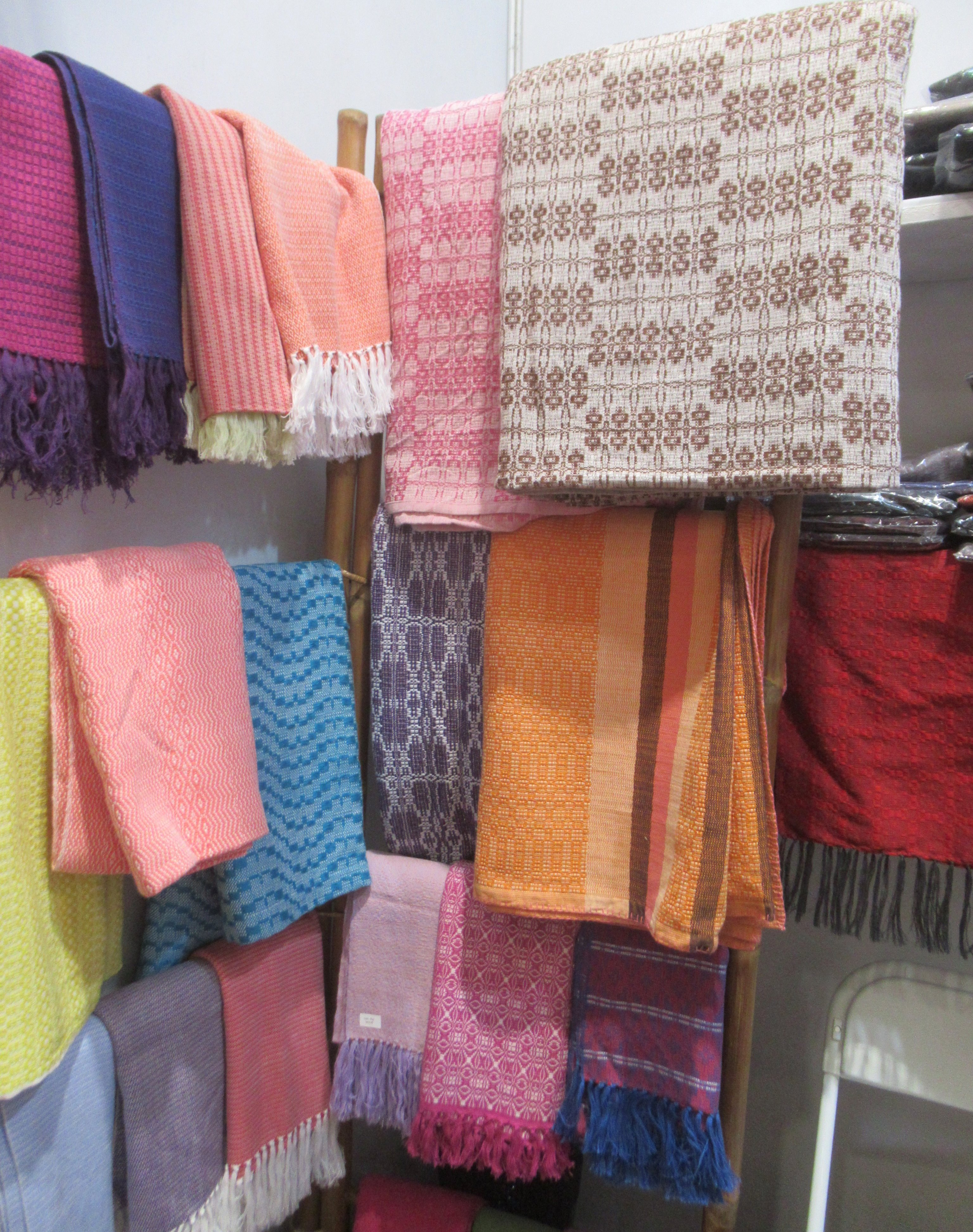
Various products made from hablon

Hablon is a traditional handwoven textile originating from the Visayas region of the Philippines, particularly in Iloilo province. It is produced on a handloom using natural fibers such as cotton, piña (pineapple fiber), and jusi (banana fiber). The term hablon comes from the Hiligaynon word habol, meaning “to weave,” and may refer both to the process of weaving and to the woven fabric itself.

Designs are typically plaid, striped, or checkered, often in bright colors such as red, yellow, green, and blue, with metallic threads sometimes added for accent. Hablon is considered both a utilitarian and ceremonial fabric, historically used for everyday clothing, shawls, patadyong, and the barong tagalog.

== History ==
Weaving in Iloilo predates the Spanish colonial period, with local communities using indigenous fibers to produce cloth for everyday use and trade. During the Spanish era, Iloilo developed into one of the country’s most important weaving centers, with hablon valued for its durability and intricate patterns. By the 19th century, Iloilo had earned the title "Textile Capital of the Philippines" due to the growth of its handloom weaving industry. The production and trade of hablon and related textiles flourished in towns such as Miagao, Oton, and Arevalo. In the 1850s, textile goods were the leading exports of Iloilo, with woven materials accounting for more than half of the province’s total export value.

By the 1880s, after the port of Iloilo was opened to international trade, the weaving industry gradually lost its prominence to the sugar trade in Western Visayas. The introduction of inexpensive, machine-made fabrics in the late 19th and early 20th centuries further accelerated the decline of traditional weaving. Despite this, hablon production endured in certain communities, sustained through family traditions and small-scale cooperatives. Since the late 20th century, revival efforts by local governments, cultural organizations, and fashion designers have helped preserve and promote hablon weaving. Miagao, Iloilo, in particular, has become a recognized hub for hablon, with weaving cooperatives supporting both livelihoods and cultural heritage.

== Production methods ==
Hablon weaving is carried out on a foot-powered handloom (telar de pedal), requiring skill and time-intensive labor. The process generally involves:

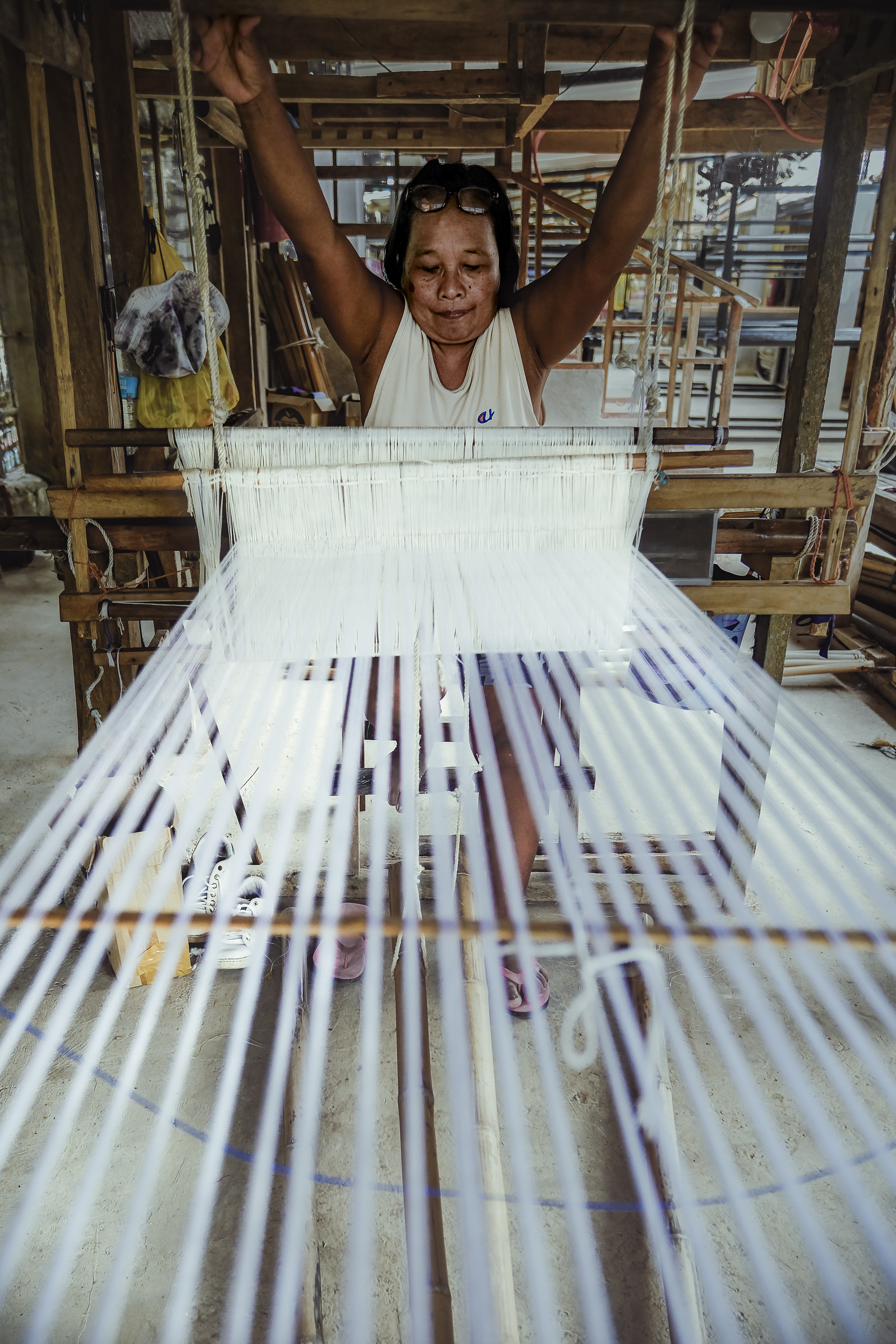
Local hablon weaver in Argao, Cebu

1. Preparation of fibers – Traditional materials include cotton, piña, and jusi. Contemporary hablon often incorporates polyester or rayon to increase strength and sheen.
2. Dyeing – Threads are dyed in bright colors, typically red, yellow, green, or blue. Natural dyes were historically used, though synthetic dyes are more common today.
3. Warping and threading – Fibers are arranged onto the loom to create the warp.
4. Weaving – The weft is interlaced to form patterns, commonly stripes, plaids, or checks. Metallic threads may also be added for decorative purposes.

Hablon has traditionally been used for everyday clothing, shawls, patadyong (wrap-around skirts), and barong tagalog.

== Recognition ==
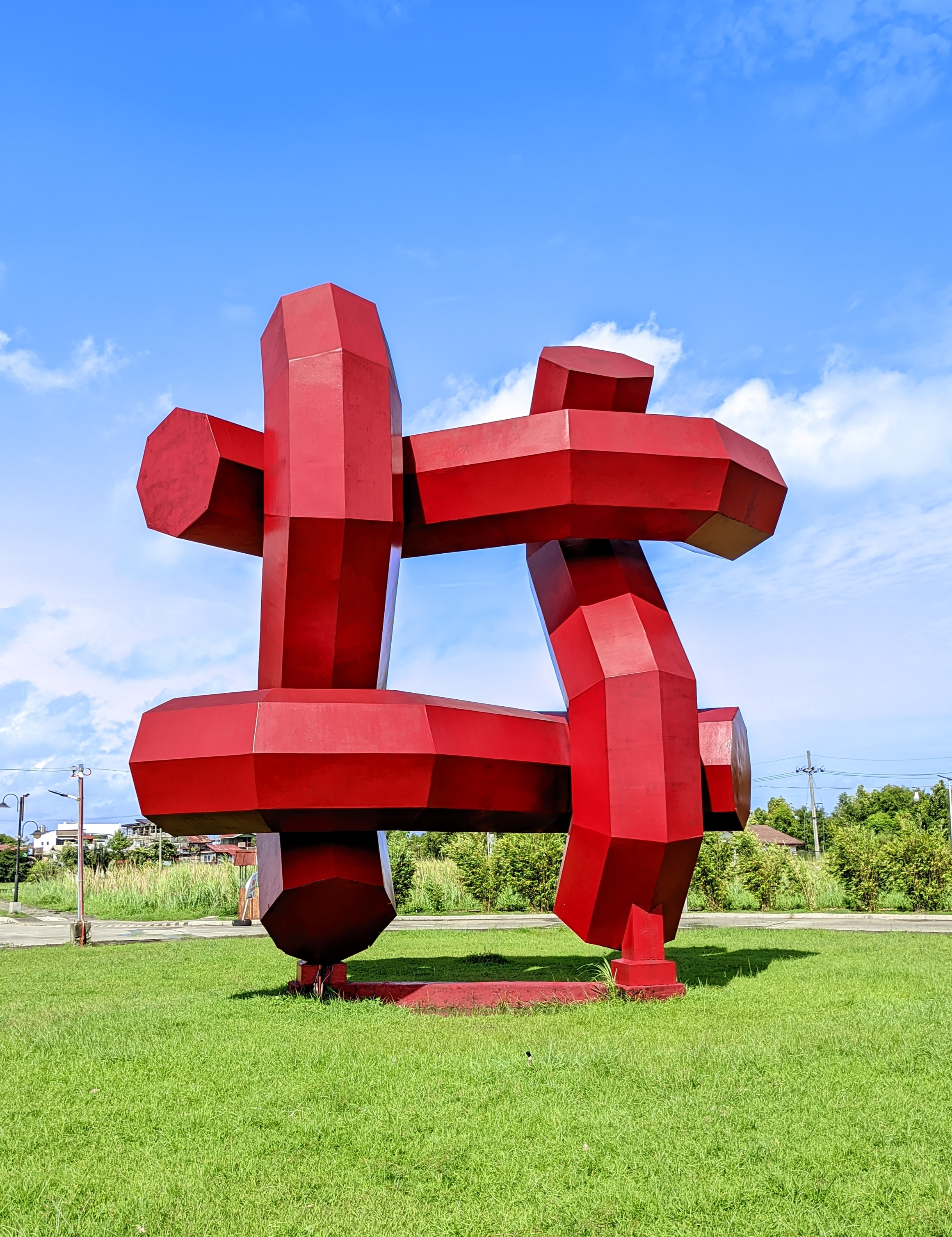
Hablon sculpture in Iloilo City

In recent decades, hablon weaving has been recognized as an important aspect of Philippine cultural heritage. The municipality of Miagao has declared hablon weaving a priority cultural and livelihood program, supporting local cooperatives and weavers. Miagao also celebrates the Hablon Festival, a week-long event held every September.

The textile has also been promoted by Filipino fashion designers who integrate hablon into contemporary clothing, gaining exposure on national and international platforms. It has been acknowledged by the Department of Trade and Industry (DTI) and the National Commission for Culture and the Arts (NCCA) as part of the country’s living traditions.

Educational institutions and community organizations in Iloilo have introduced weaving into local training programs, ensuring the craft’s continuity among younger generations.

== Regional variations ==
In Argao, Cebu, hablon weaving has continued as a localized tradition, though fewer design styles have been preserved compared to Iloilo. Common patterns include plain, striped, checkered, rayon-mixed, and plaid fabrics. Brocade weaving in Cebu was only rediscovered in recent years with the support of local brands. Oral accounts suggest that Cebuano weavers have re-learned some advanced techniques through exchange with Ilonggo weavers, such as in training programs.

== See also ==
- Piña
- Abacá
- Batik
- Inabel
- Malong
- Tapis
- T'nalak
