= Putong =

Filipino ceremony

Putong or tubong is a ceremony occasionally performed in the Province of Marinduque, Philippines, in which visitors are honored and welcomed. The ceremony takes the form of the eponymous song which is a call for "thanksgiving, hope and prayer for a long, blessed life". The ceremony begins with the celebrants gathering around the home of the host, they begin singing slowly as they enter the house, accompanied by a guitarist. They women wear costumes such as a kimona or a saya, while the men wear a barong, and they carry baskets of flowers, palm leaves, or coins. Once in the home, the tempo of the song picks up until a crown is placed on the honoree's head. After being crowned, the honoree is then showered with the contents of the celebrant's baskets. The celebration ends with all the participants shouting Mabuhay, which means "long life".
