= Baro't saya =

Traditional woman's costume of the Philippines

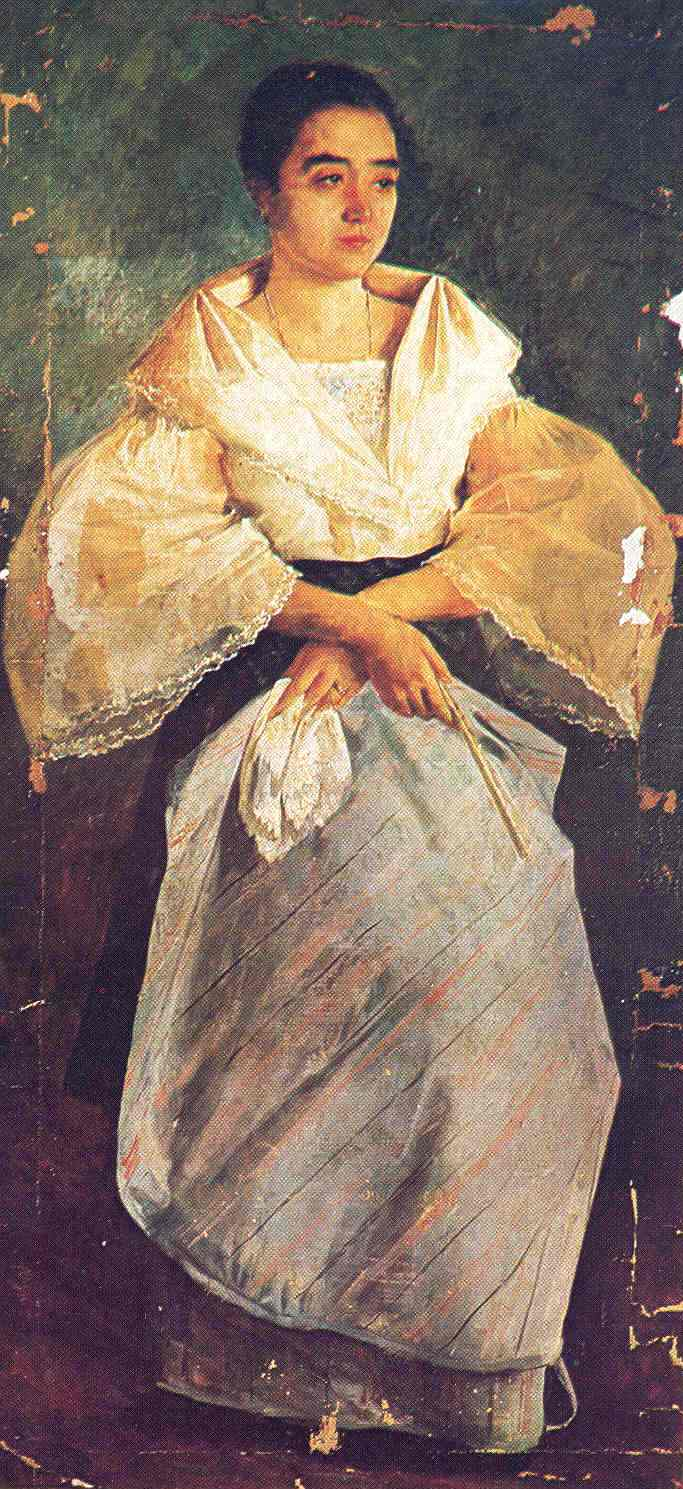
La Bulaqueña, an 1895 painting by Juan Luna of an upper class woman from Bulacan wearing a traje de mestiza. The painting is sometimes referred to as the "María Clara" due to the woman's dress.

The baro't saya or baro at saya (literally "blouse and skirt") is a traditional dress ensemble worn by women in the Philippines. It is a national dress of the Philippines and combines elements from both the precolonial native Filipino and colonial Spanish clothing styles. It traditionally consists of four parts: a blouse (baro or camisa), a long skirt (saya or falda), a kerchief worn over the shoulders (pañuelo, fichu, or alampay), and a short rectangular cloth worn over the skirt (the tapis or patadyong).

The baro't saya has multiple variants, known under the collective term Filipiniana, including the aristocratic traje de mestiza (also called the María Clara); the Visayan kimona with its short-sleeved or poncho-like embroidered blouse paired with a patadyong skirt; as well as the unified gown known as the terno, and its casual and cocktail dress version, the balintawak. The masculine equivalent of the baro't saya is the barong tagalog.

== Etymology ==
Baro't saya is a contraction of "baro at saya", literally meaning "blouse and skirt", from Tagalog baro ("shirt" or "clothing") and saya (from Spanish "skirt").

== Description ==
The Baro't saya is an ensemble that traditionally consists of four parts: the blouse (baro or camisa), a long skirt (saya or falda), a kerchief worn over the shoulders (pañuelo, fichu, or alampay), and a short rectangular cloth worn over the skirt (the tapis or patadyong).

== History ==
=== Pre-colonial era ===
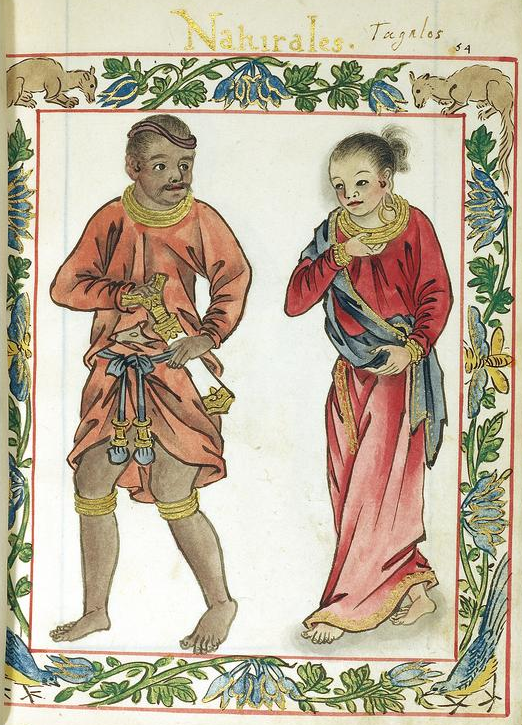
Tagalog maginoo (nobility) wearing baro in the Boxer Codex (c.1590)

Baro't saya evolved from two pieces of clothing worn by both men and women in the pre-colonial period of the Philippines: the baro (also barú or bayú in other Philippine languages, and baju in Malaysia and Indonesia), a simple collar-less shirt or jacket with close-fitting long sleeves; and the tapis (also called patadyong in the Visayas and Sulu Archipelago, and malong in Mindanao), a short rectangular or tube-like cloth worn wrapped around at waist or chest-height and secured with belts, braided material, or knotted over one shoulder. Women also usually wore bracelets over the baro. These types of clothing still survive in non-Christianized groups in the Philippines.

=== Spanish colonial era ===
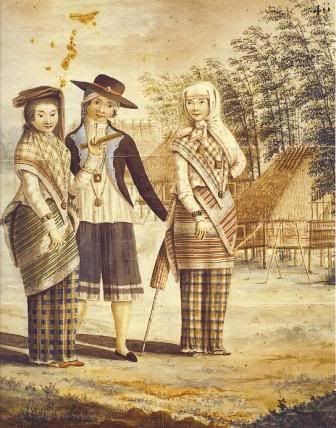
Mestizos de Manila by Juan Ravenet showing the checkered narrow pares saya of native women in the 18th century Philippines. Also note the European-style clothing of the men. (c.1792-1794)

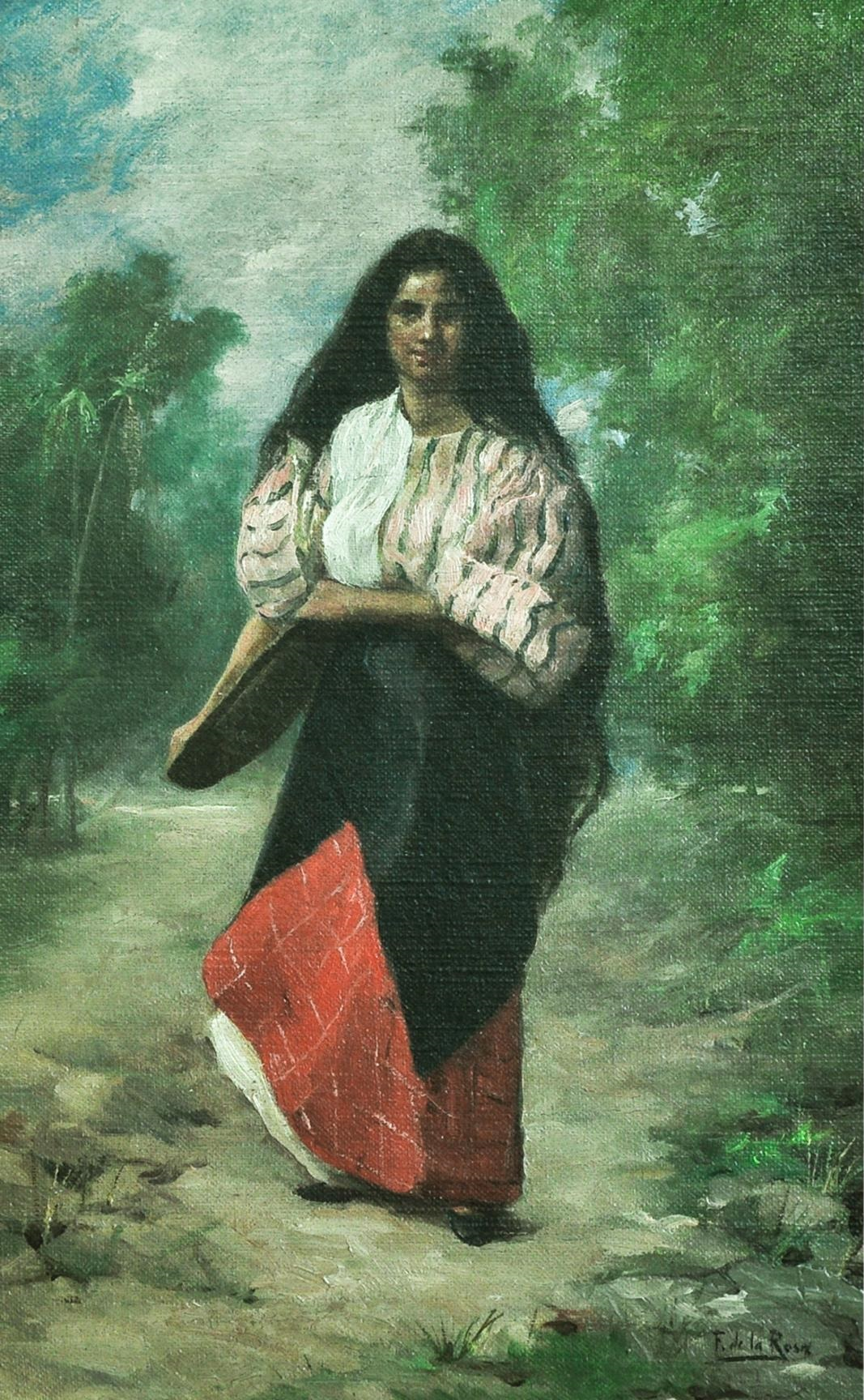
Filipina, a 19th-century painting of a working-class woman in baro't saya by Fabián de la Rosa

The Spanish clergy during the colonial period deemed the precolonial mode of dress as immodest for women and introduced the long skirt (known by the Spanish name saya or falda) to be worn under the tapis. In the Visayas, the patadyong was tolerated for longer, although it was eventually also replaced with the saya in the 19th century.

By the late 18th century, the traditional everyday wear of women in the Philippines consisted of two basic pieces of clothing known as the pares ("pair"). This consisted of a saya reaching up to the ankles (usually checkered) and a collar-less baro or camisa (usually plain or striped). The name pares was more closely associated with the skirt, which unlike later saya were narrow and sheath-like, resembling precolonial tapis. They were secured at the waist by strings and had wide, flat pleats along the waistline held together by pins. The baro was more or less identical to precolonial baro, with long narrow sleeves. Like later ensembles, these two pieces of clothing were usually complemented by a tapis (which was now worn as an overskirt) and a kerchief around the shoulders known as the pañuelo, fichu, or alampay (made from the same opaque material as the skirts).

The fabrics used for early sayas were usually native textiles (particularly textiles made by highlander Visayans in Panay). Later on in the 19th century, they began to use similar imported textiles, most notably the cambaya imported from India.

The narrow width of the 18th-century pares saya, however, made them impractical for everyday life. By the 1820s to 1840s, the saya was replaced by a billowy western-style skirt known as the saya a la mascota. For women of the upper classes (principalia), they were usually ankle-length; while for women in the lower classes, they usually reached down to mid-calf to facilitate freer movement while working. Knee-length versions were also allowed for young girls.

Designs and elements of the dress also later diverged sharply between the lower classes and the aristocratic Principalia classes from the mid-19th century onwards. The tapis for example, which was unique to Philippine women's attire, became much shorter between the 1840s to the 1860s. Due to this, they became more restricted to the native indios, while Spanish women and some mestizas avoided wearing it because of its resemblance to the delantal (aprons) worn by servants. This dichotomy was depicted in José Rizal's 1887 novel Noli Me Tángere where the mestiza protagonist María Clara wore a tapis and a baro't saya, while the pretentious Doña Consolación (a native married to a peninsular) wore European-style dresses without the tapis.

== Gallery ==
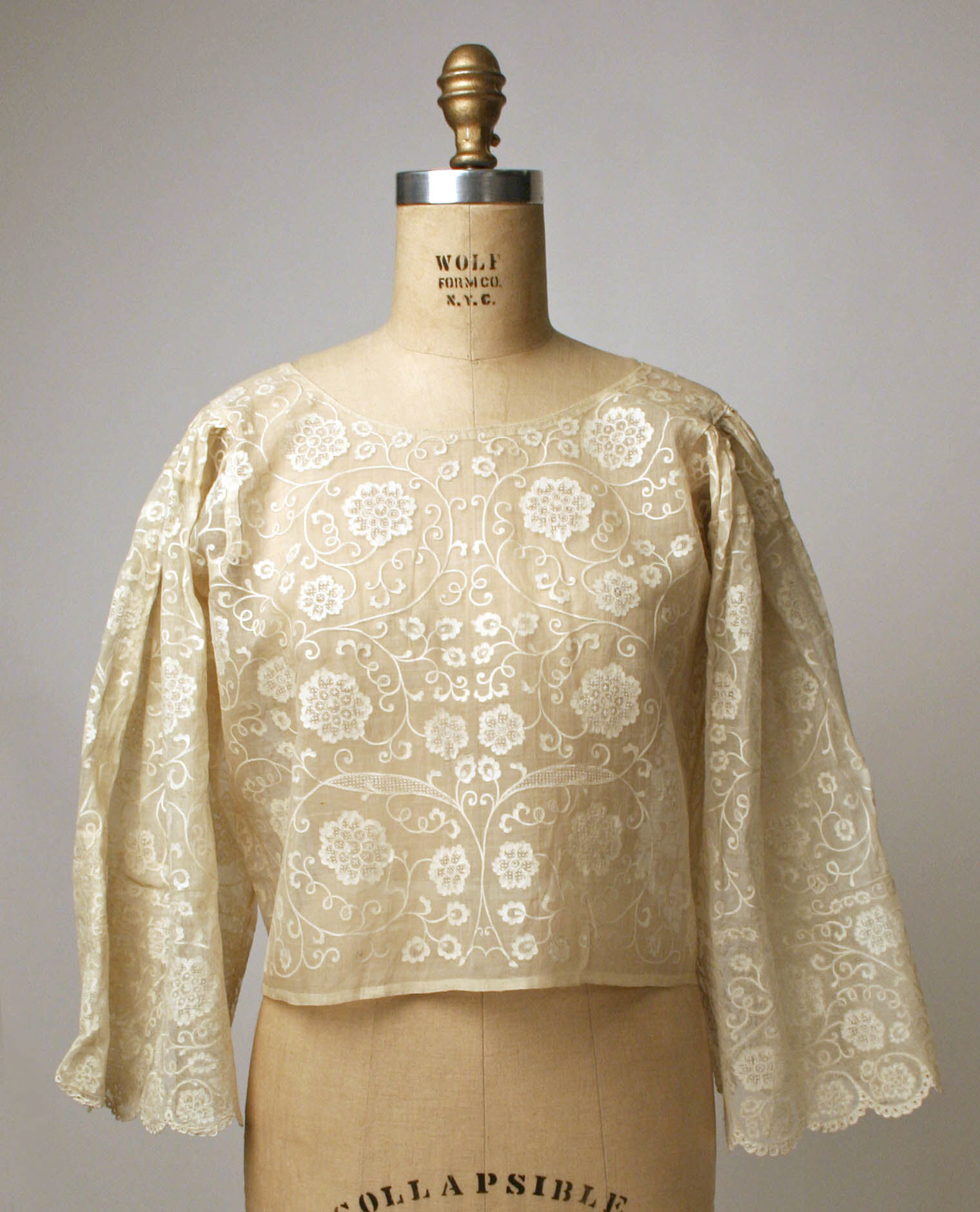
19th-century camisa from the Metropolitan Museum of Art

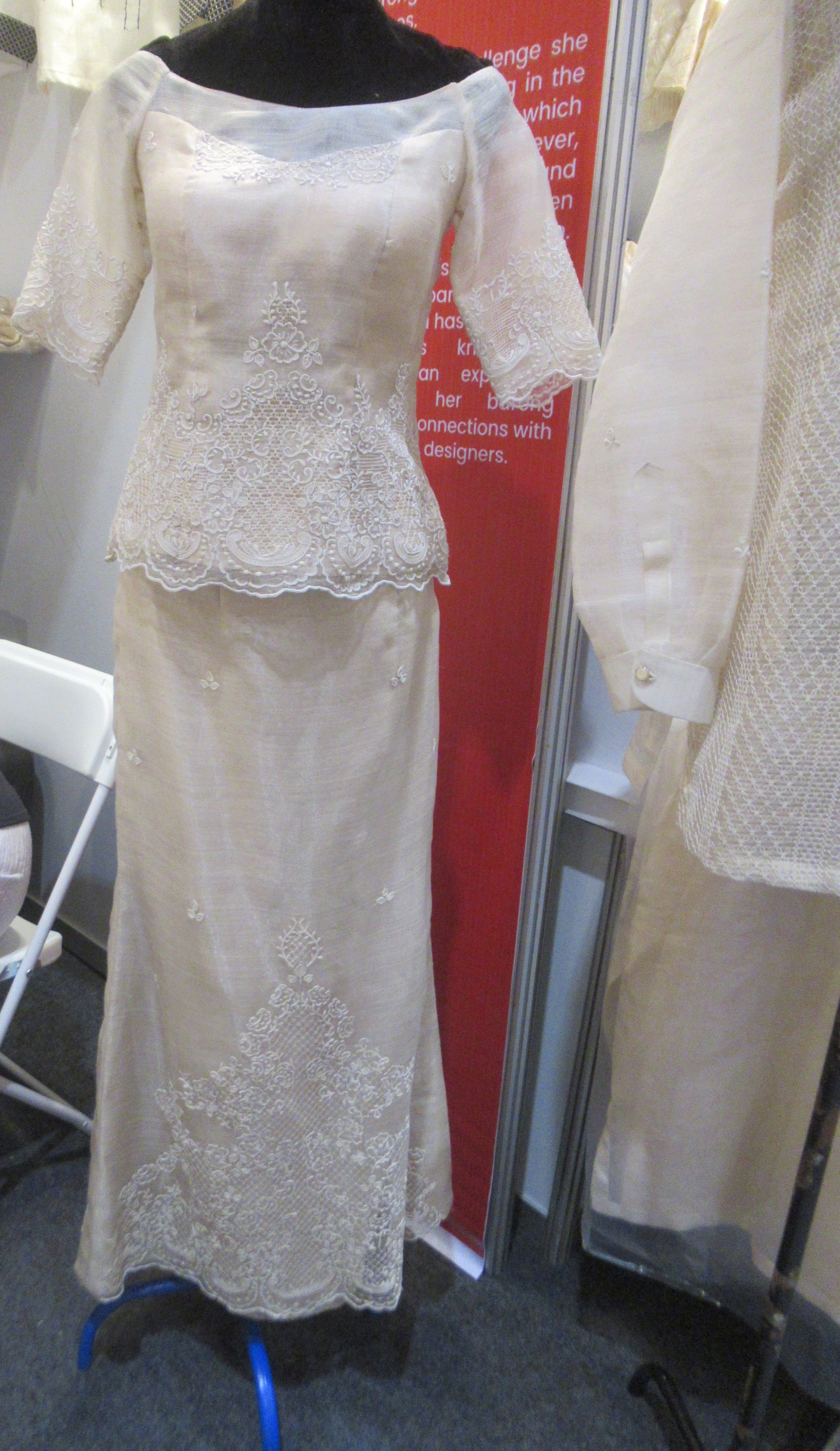

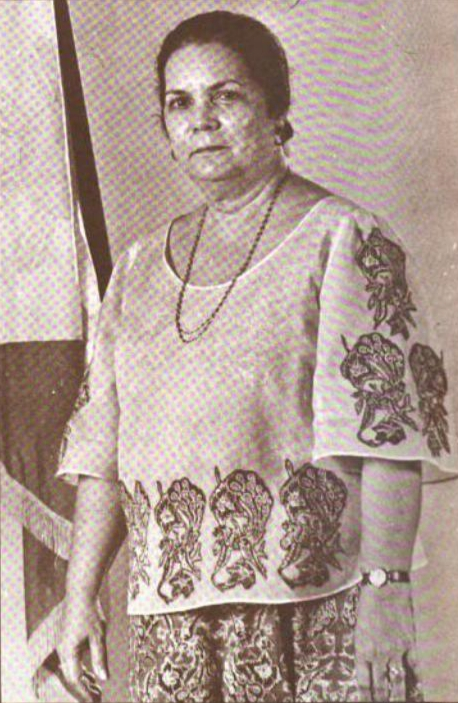

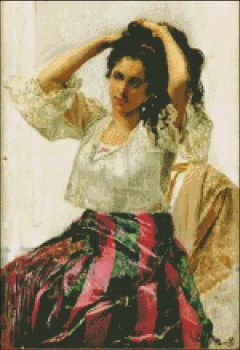
Una Mestiza by Juan Luna depicting a woman in a baro't saya (c.1887)

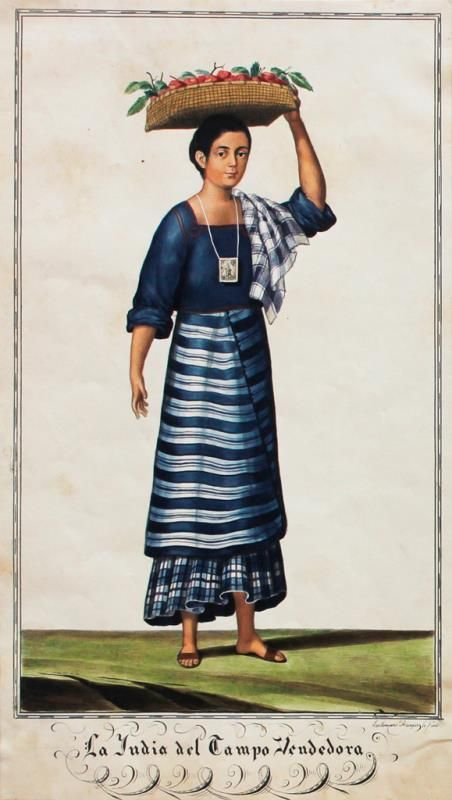
"La India del Campo Vendedora" by Justiniano Asuncion (c.1855)

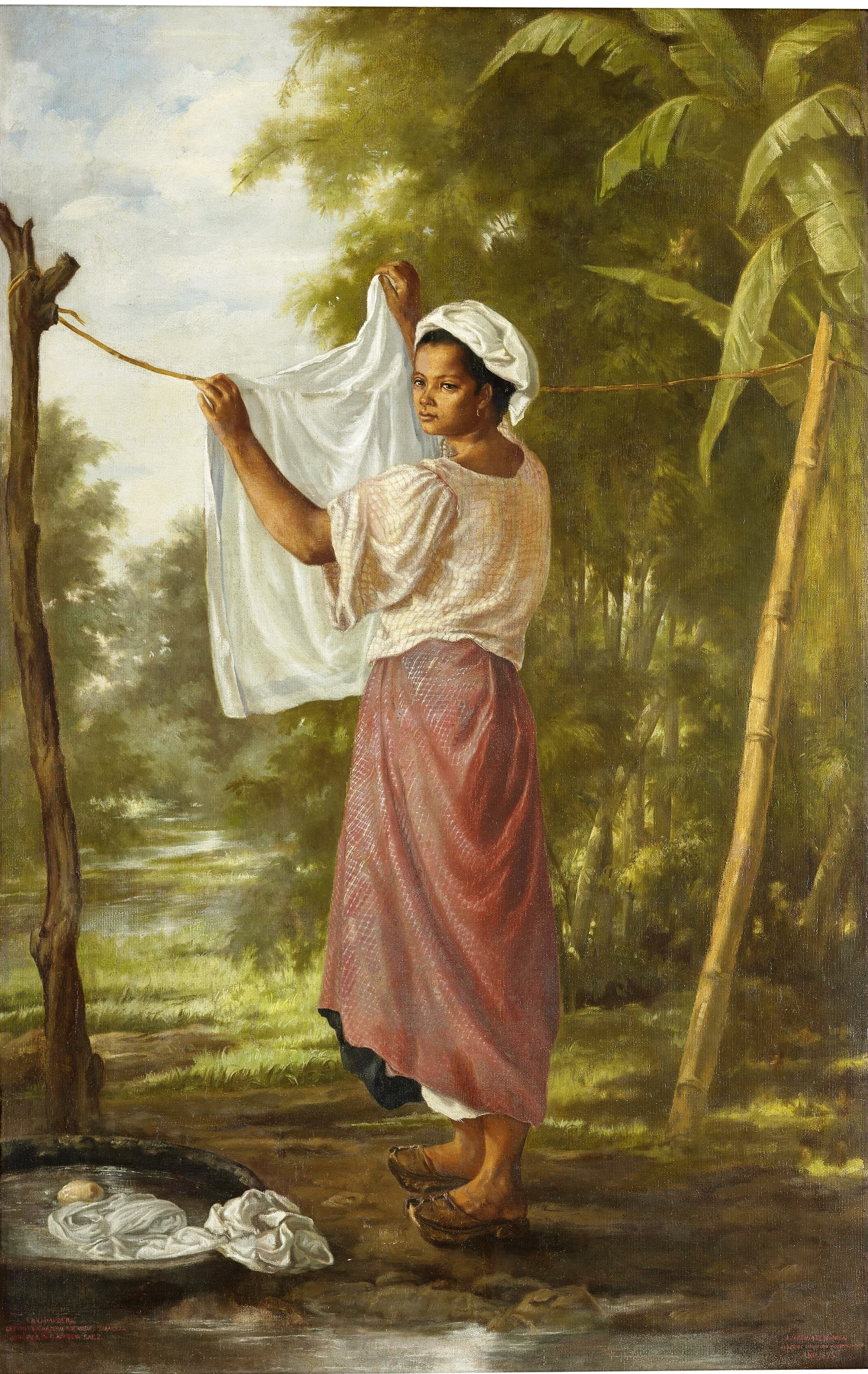
La Lavandera by Miguel Zaragoza in the Museo del Prado (c.1875)

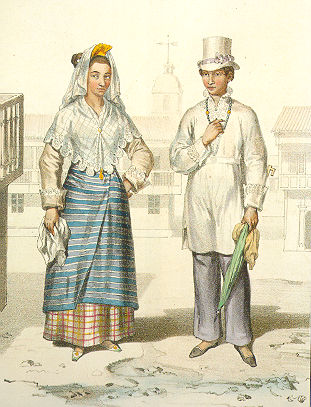
Baro't saya worn by a mestizo de sangley couple by Jean Mallat de Bassilan (c.1846)

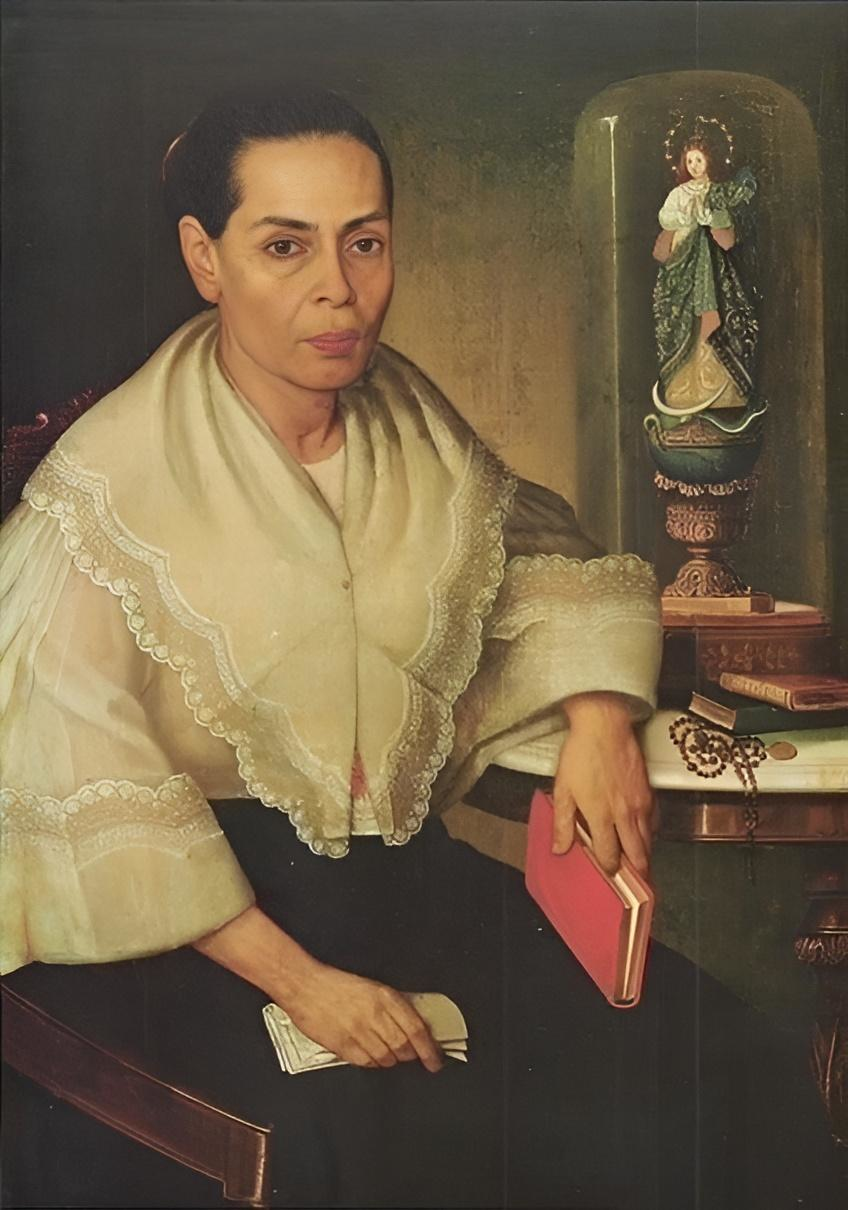

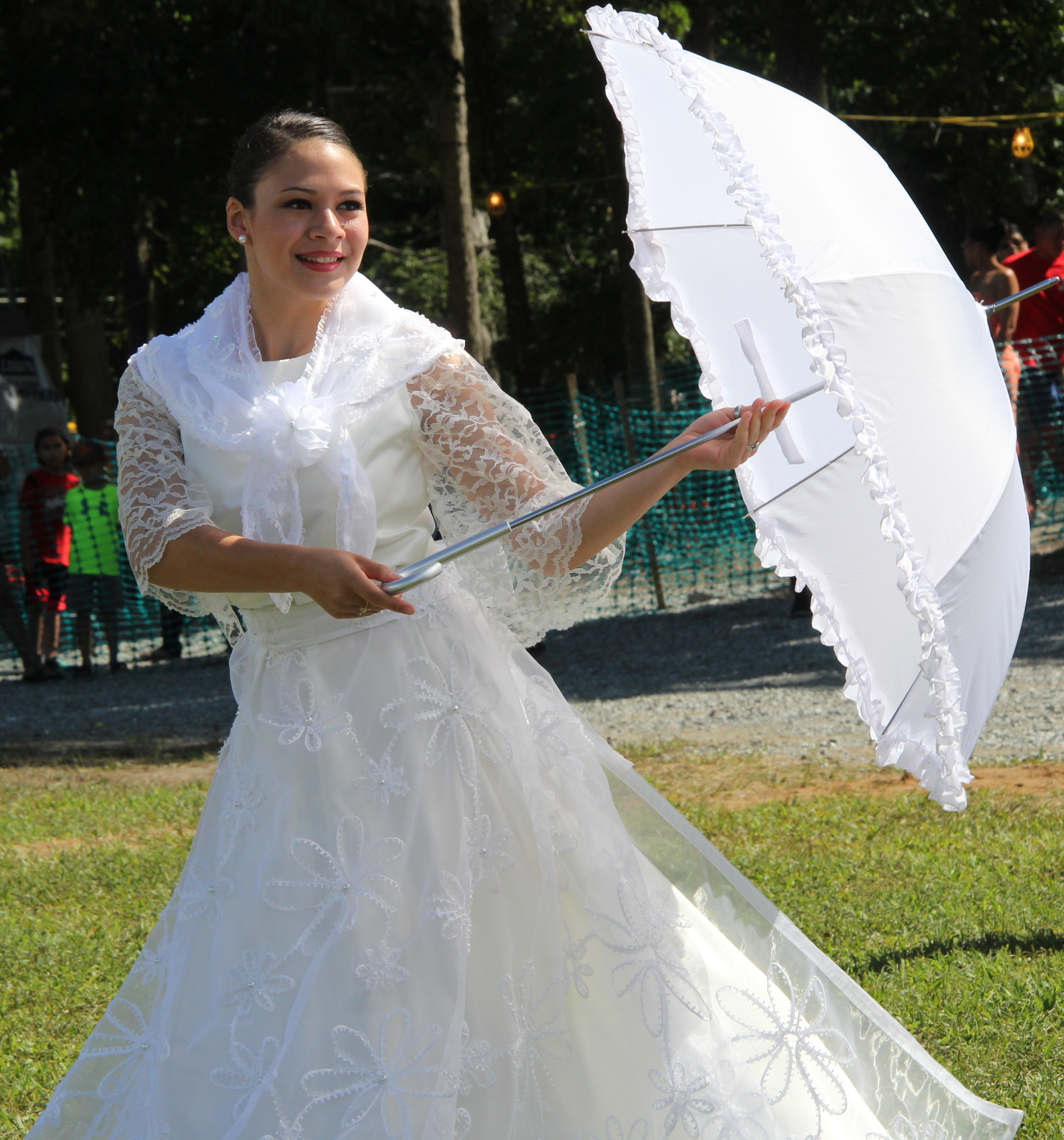
A dancer wearing a modern traje de mestiza at the 2015 Richmond Filipino Festival

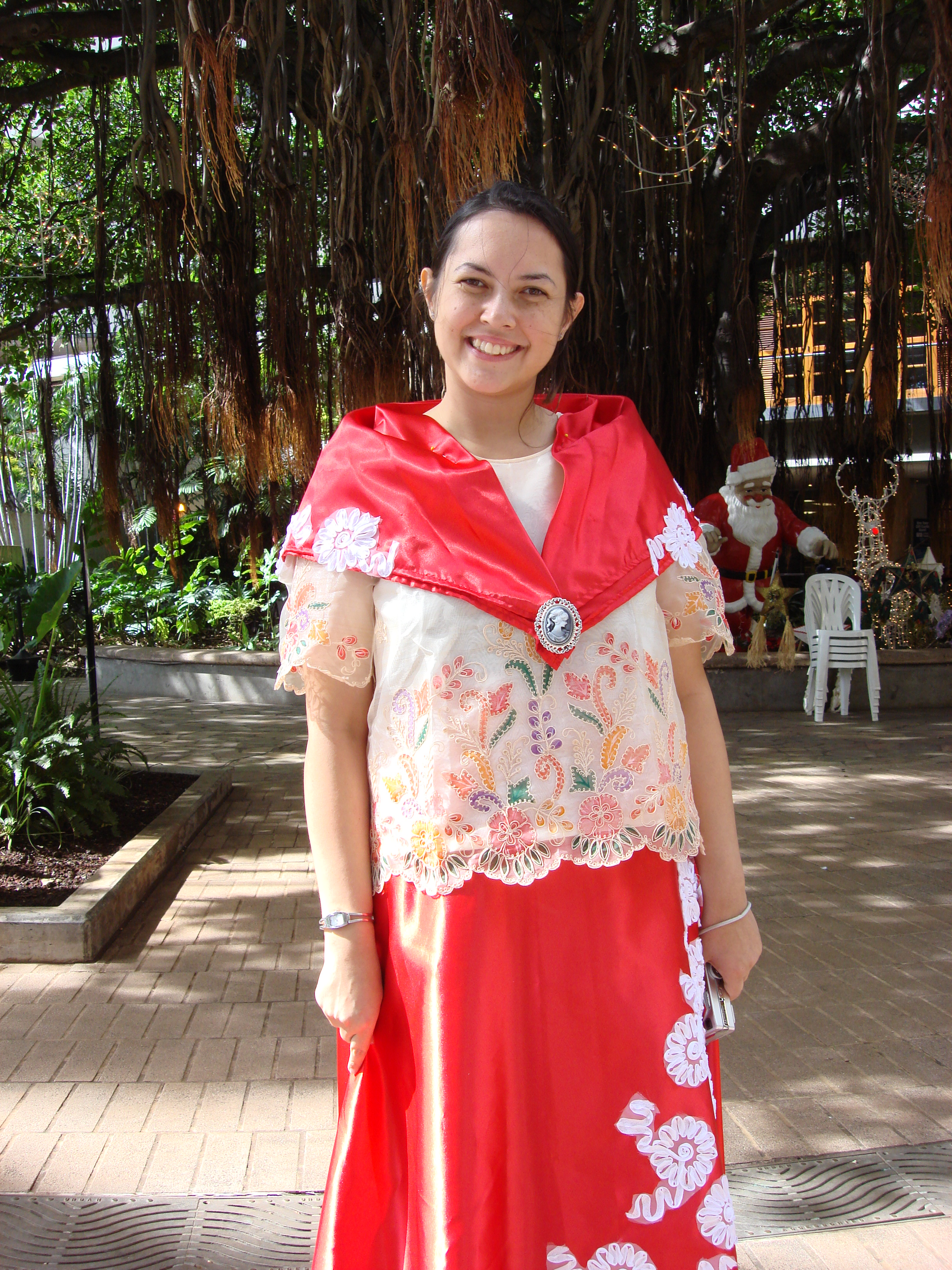
Woman wearing a baro't saya during the 2007 Asian Pacific American Heritage Month in Hawaii

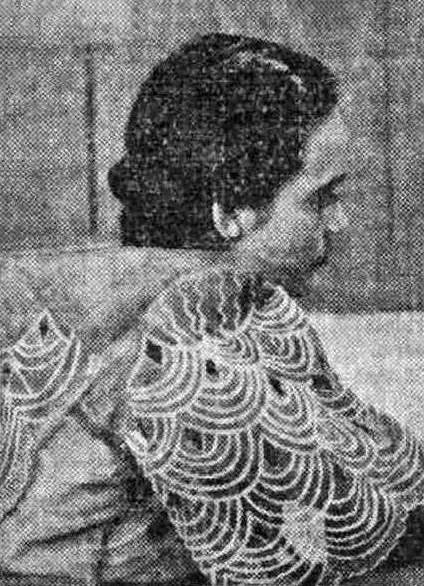

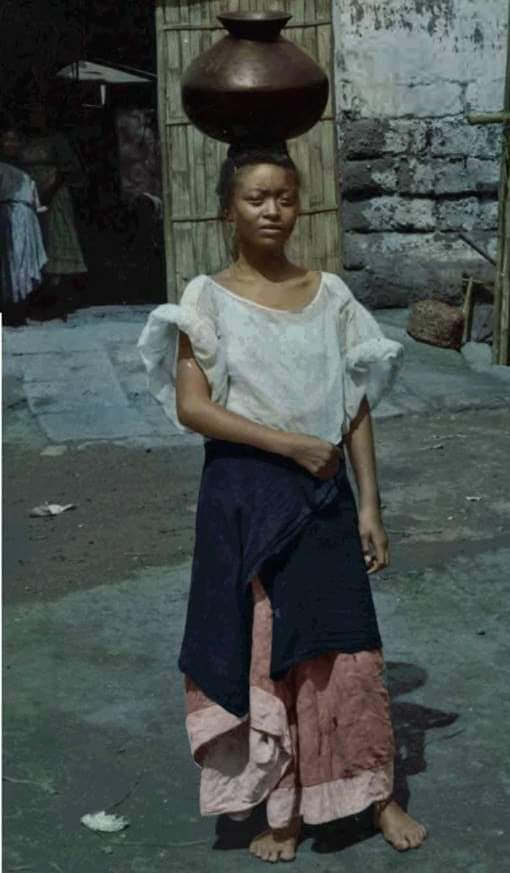
Filipina woman wearing baro't saya while working.

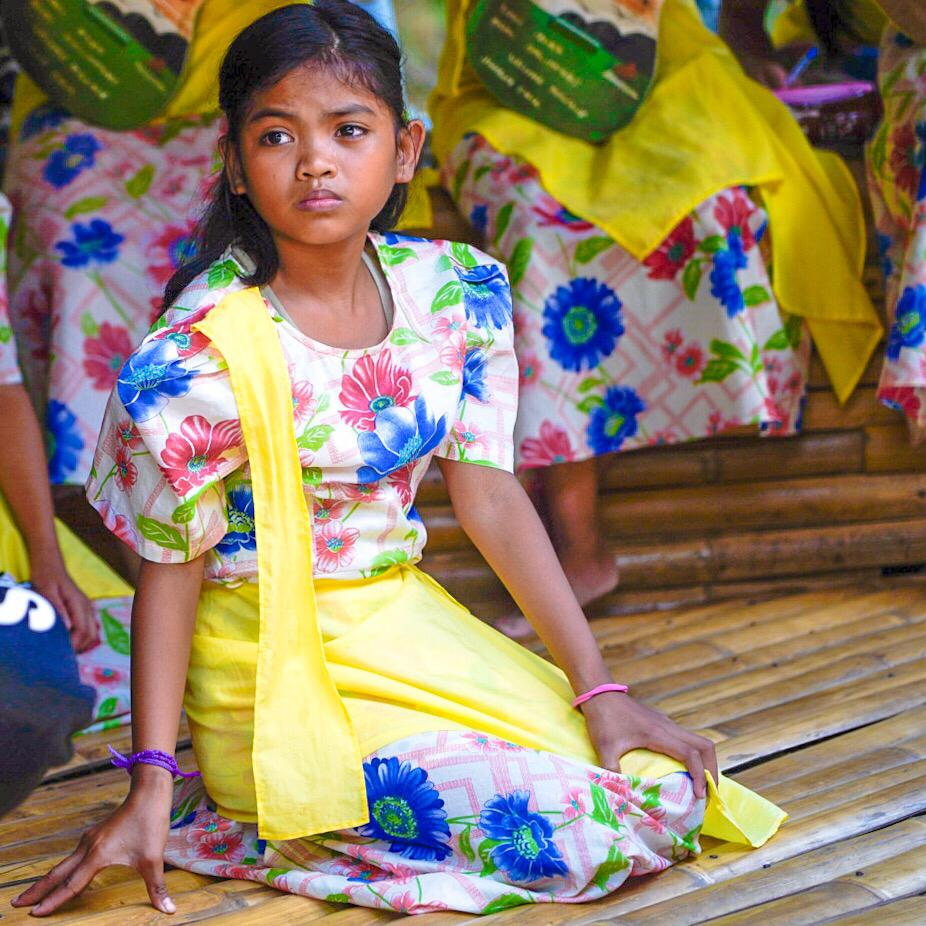
Visayan girl wearing baro't saya while performing Tinikling.

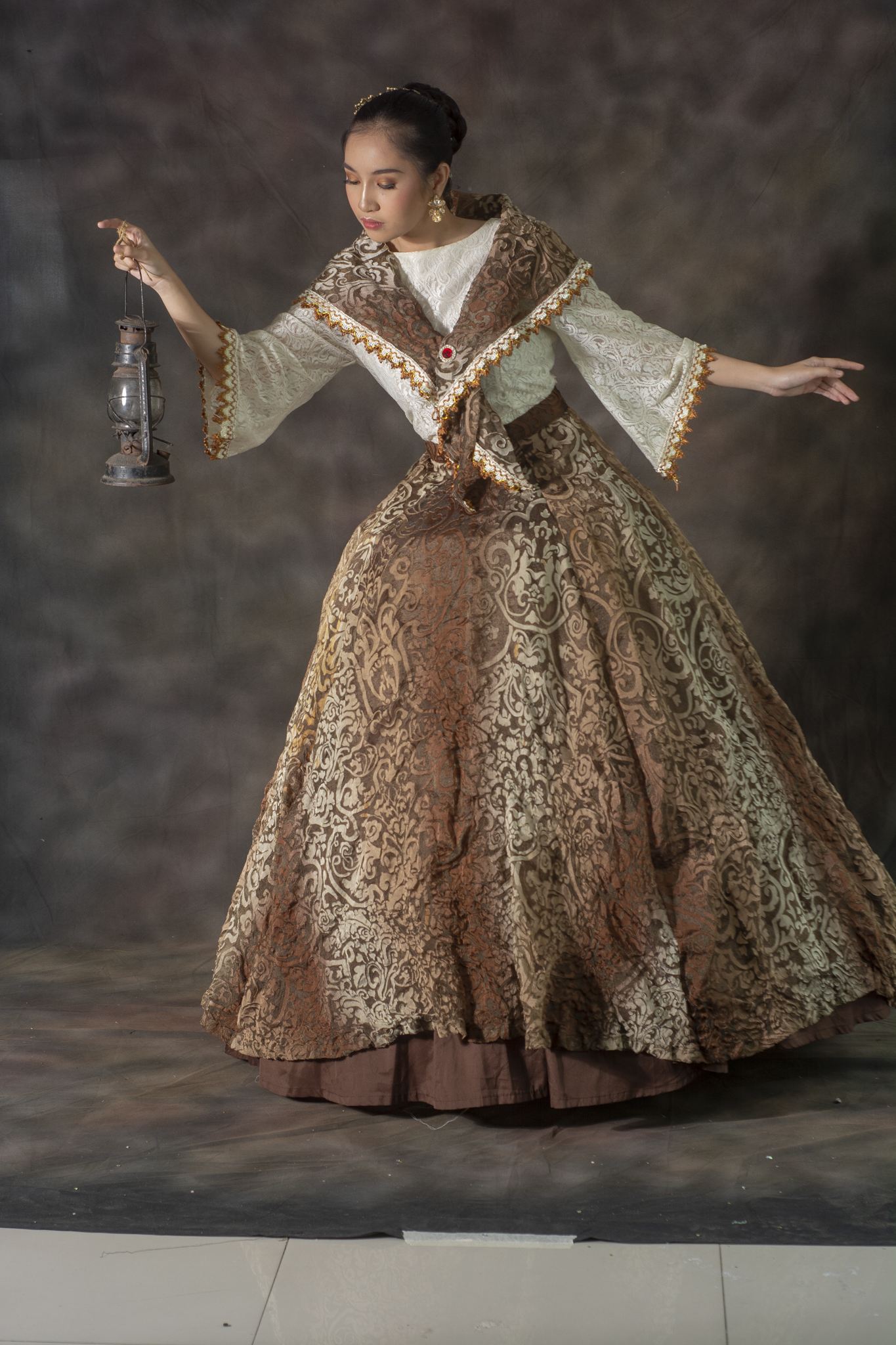

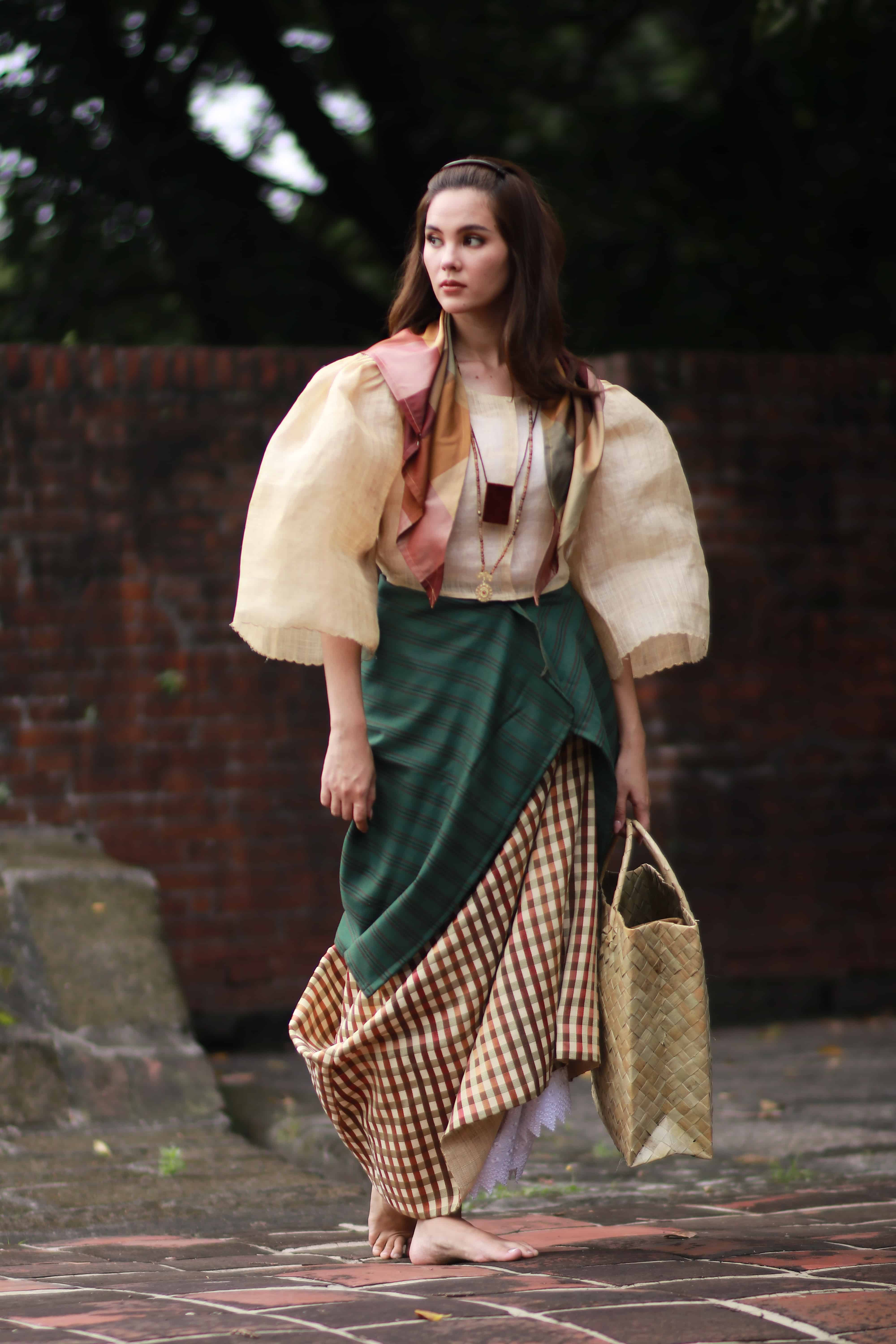

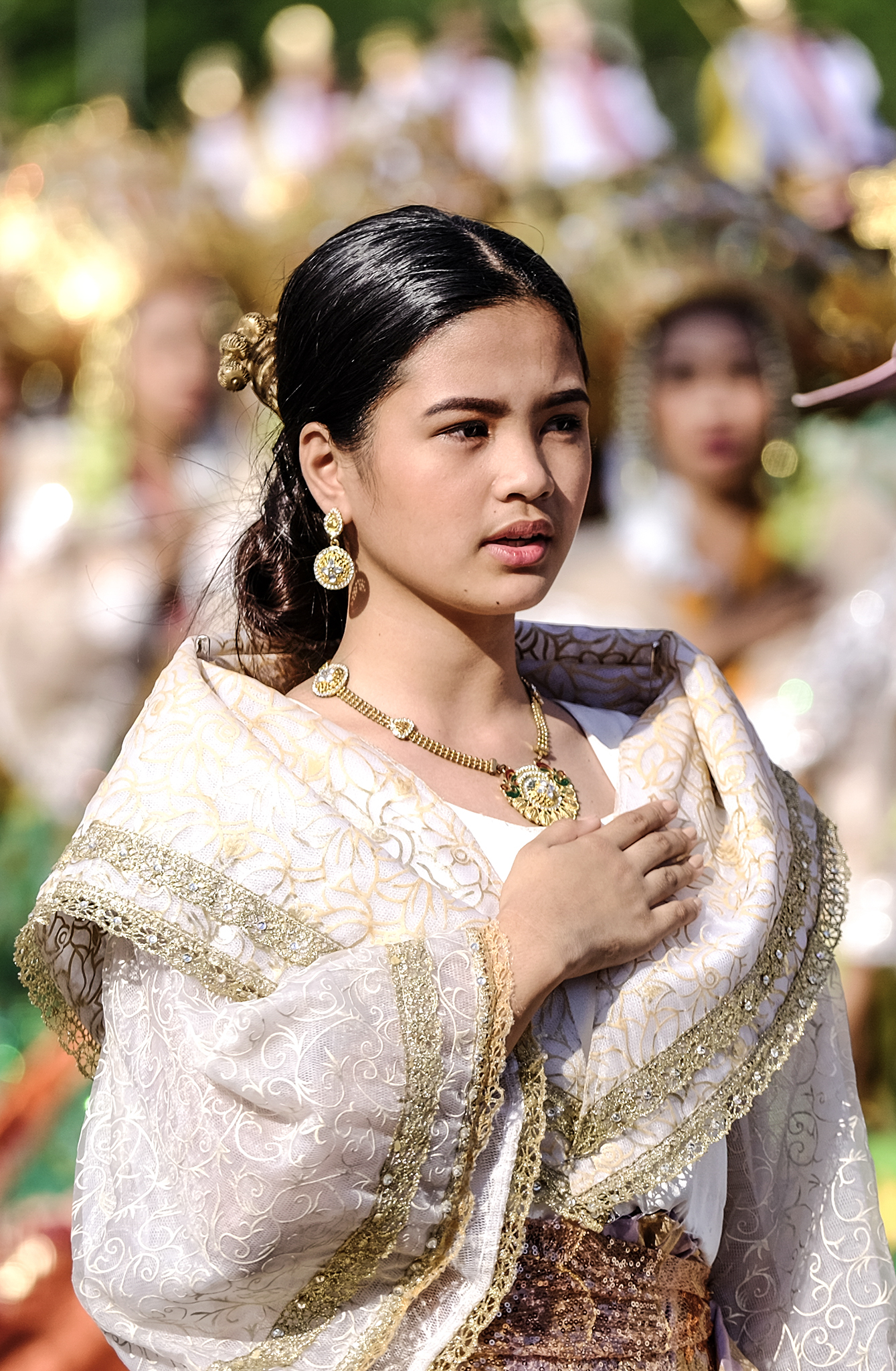

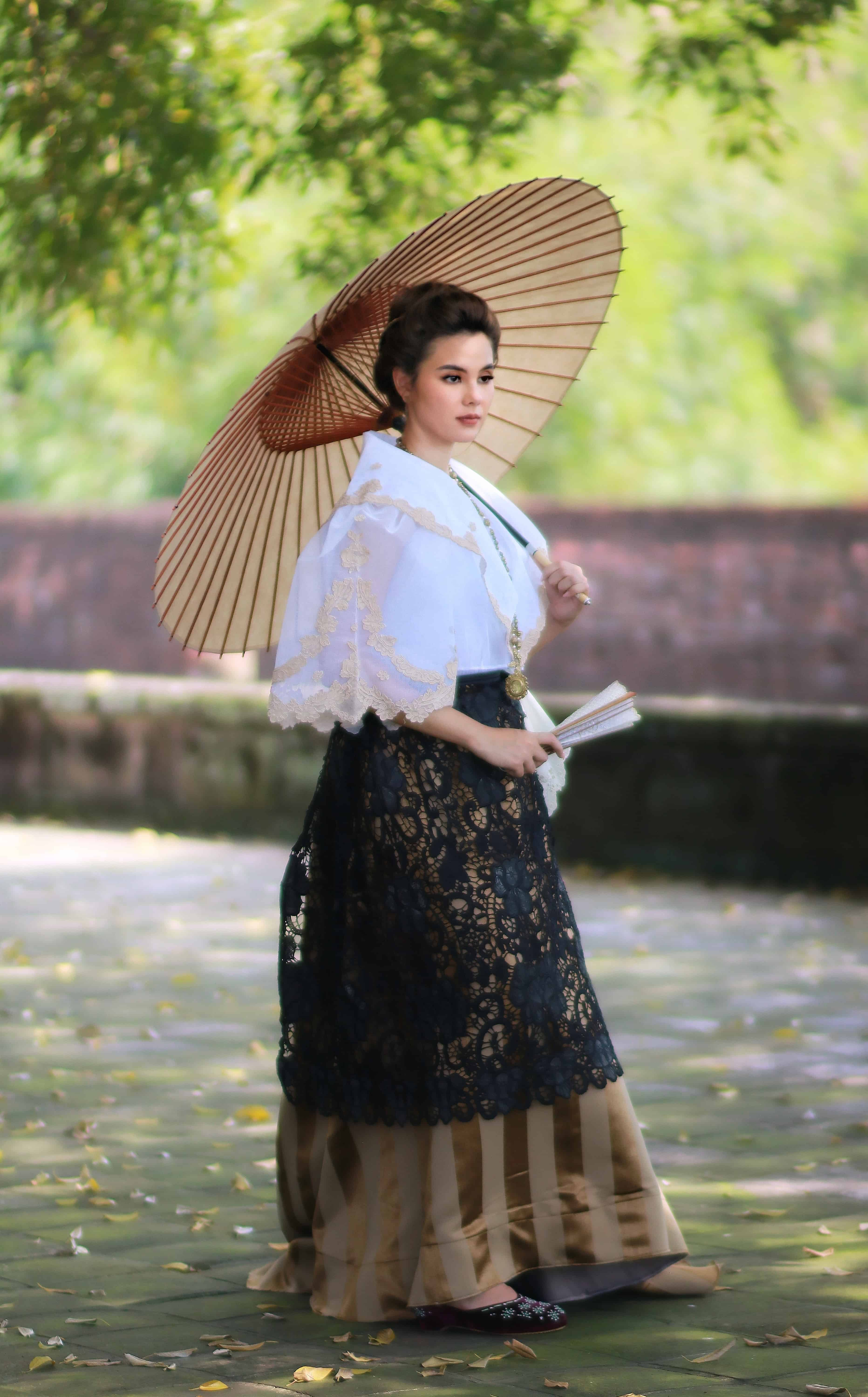

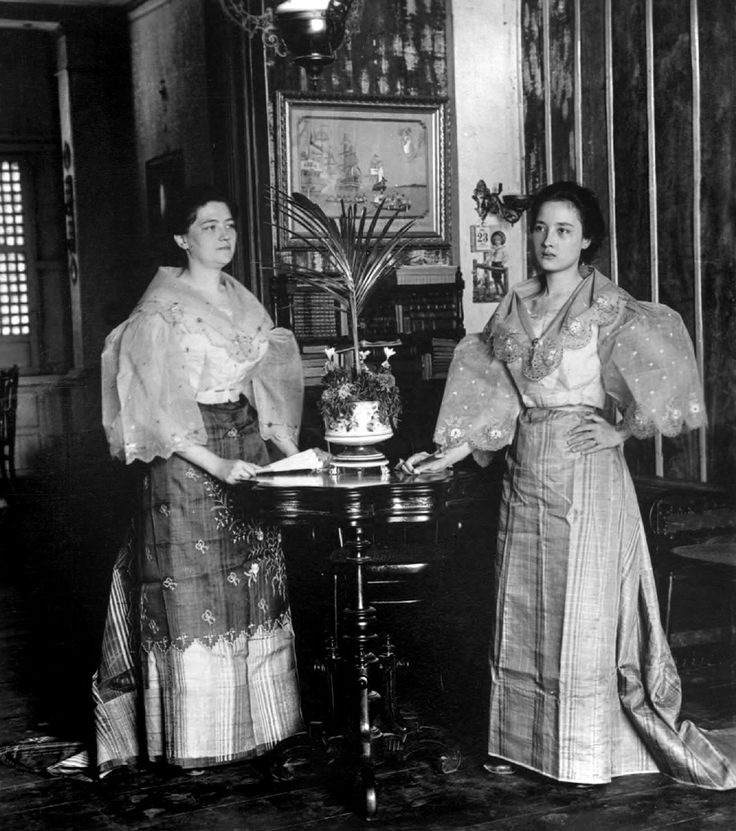

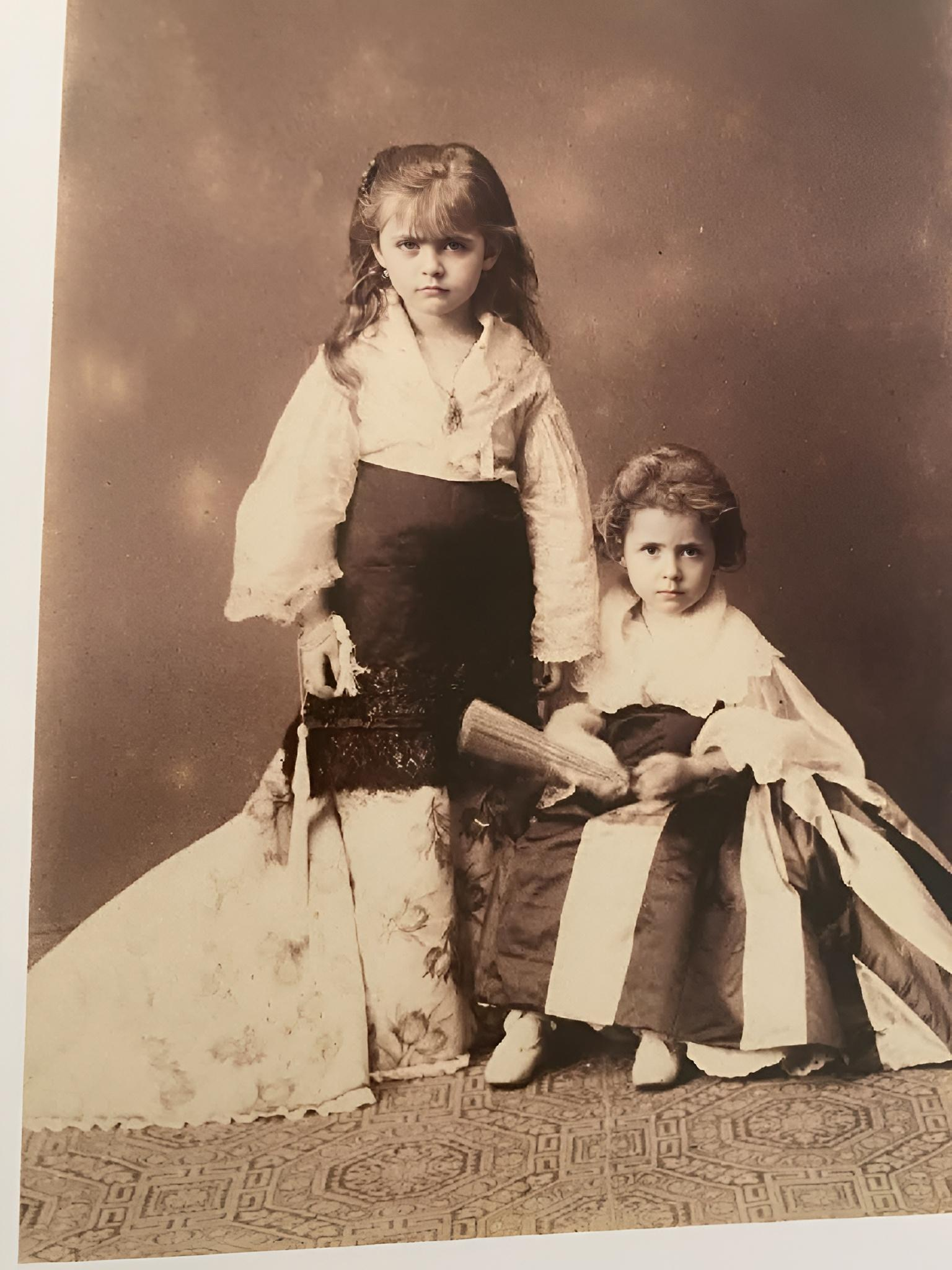

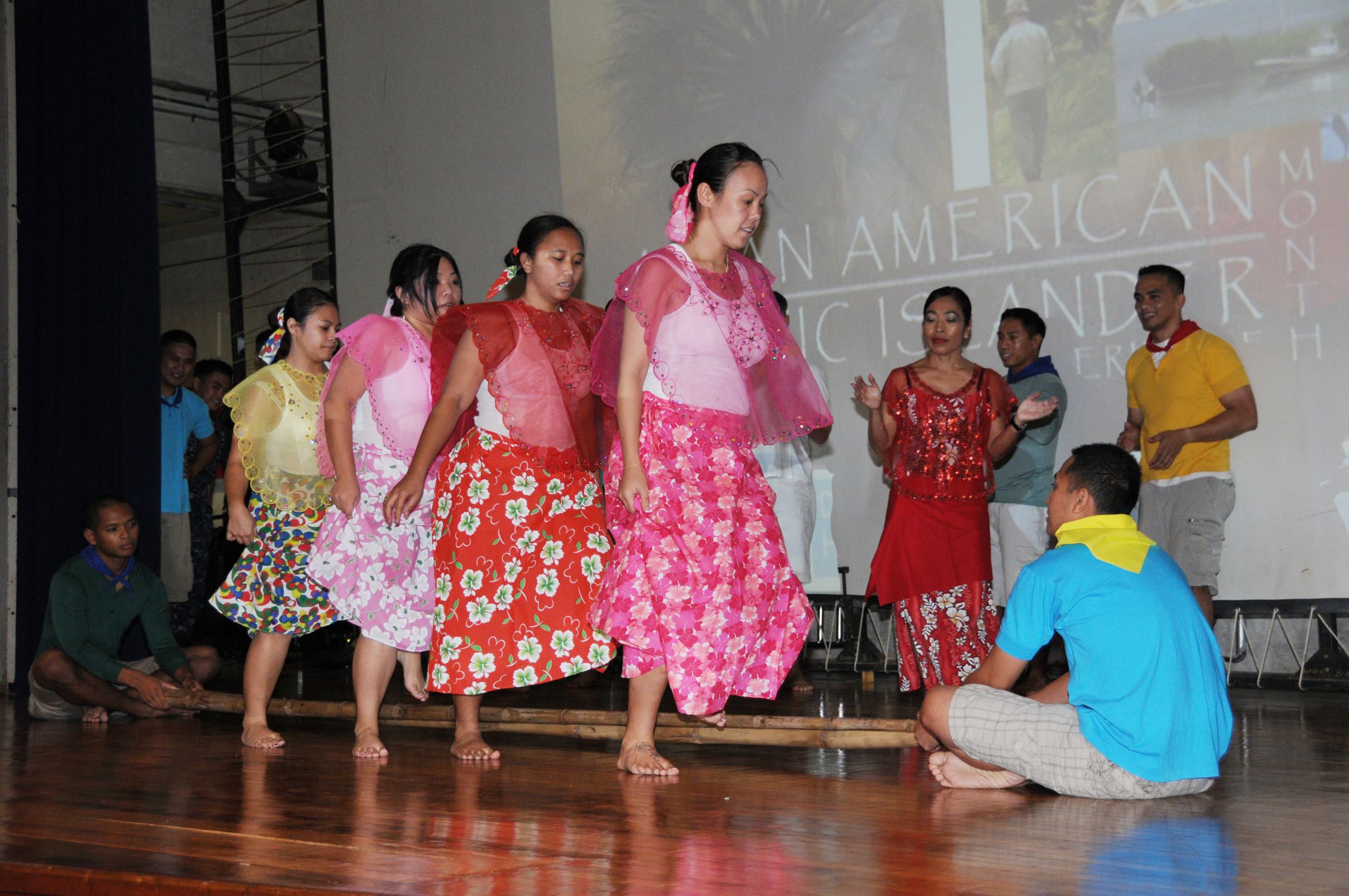
Visayan Kimona

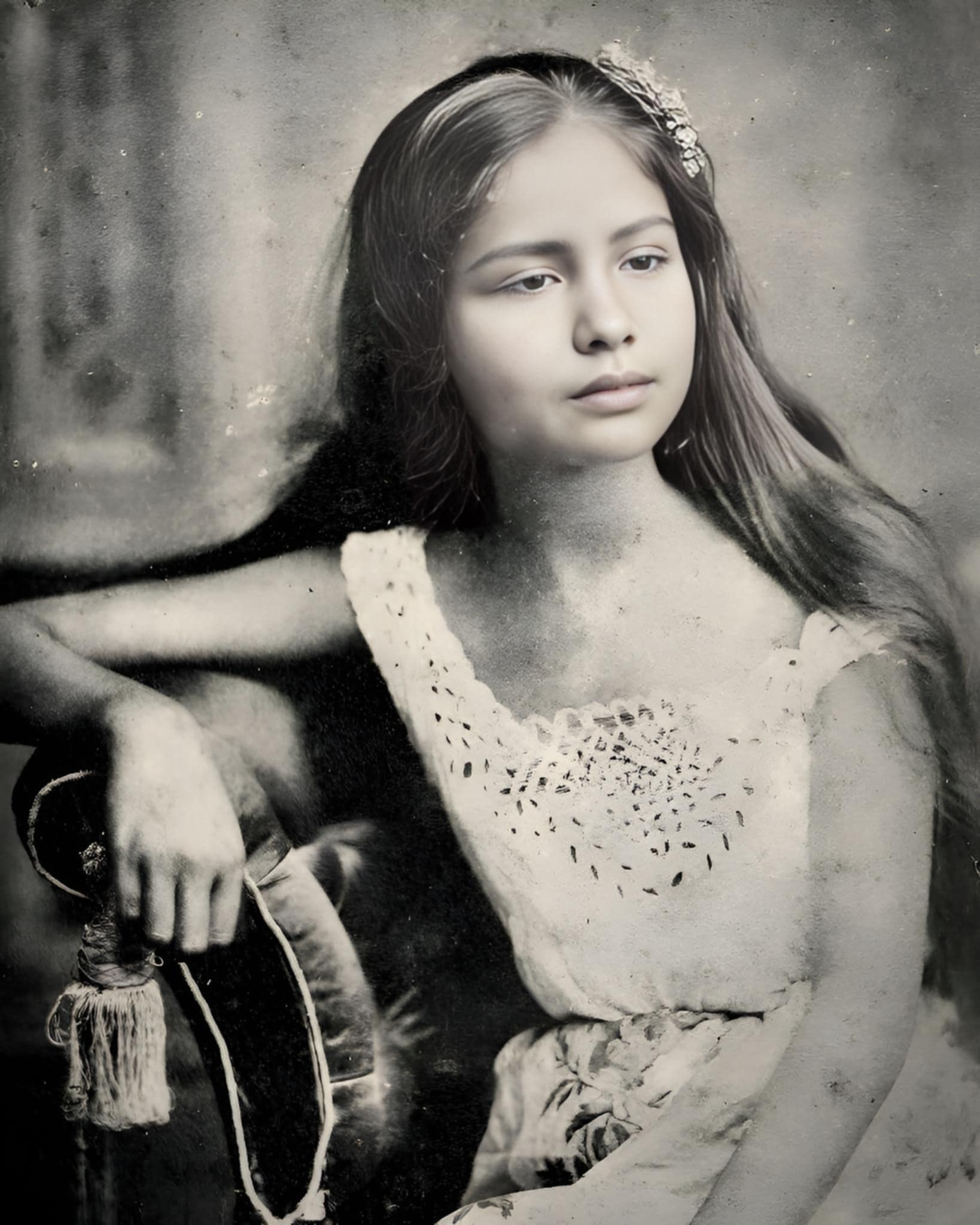
Traditional Corpiño which is the undergarment covering the torso, especially the chest, and is part of the whole Baro't Saya attire

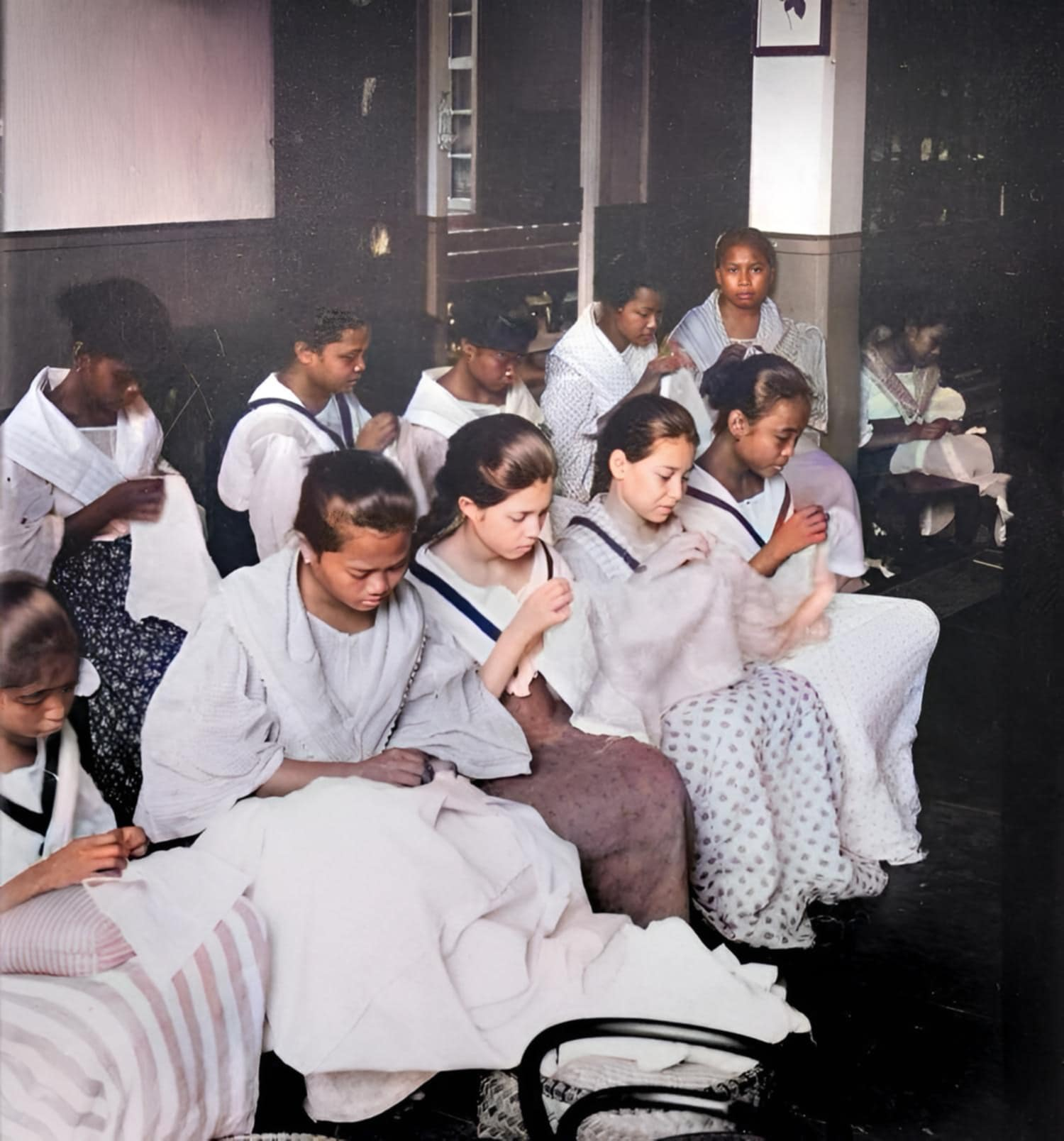
Filipina embroiderers

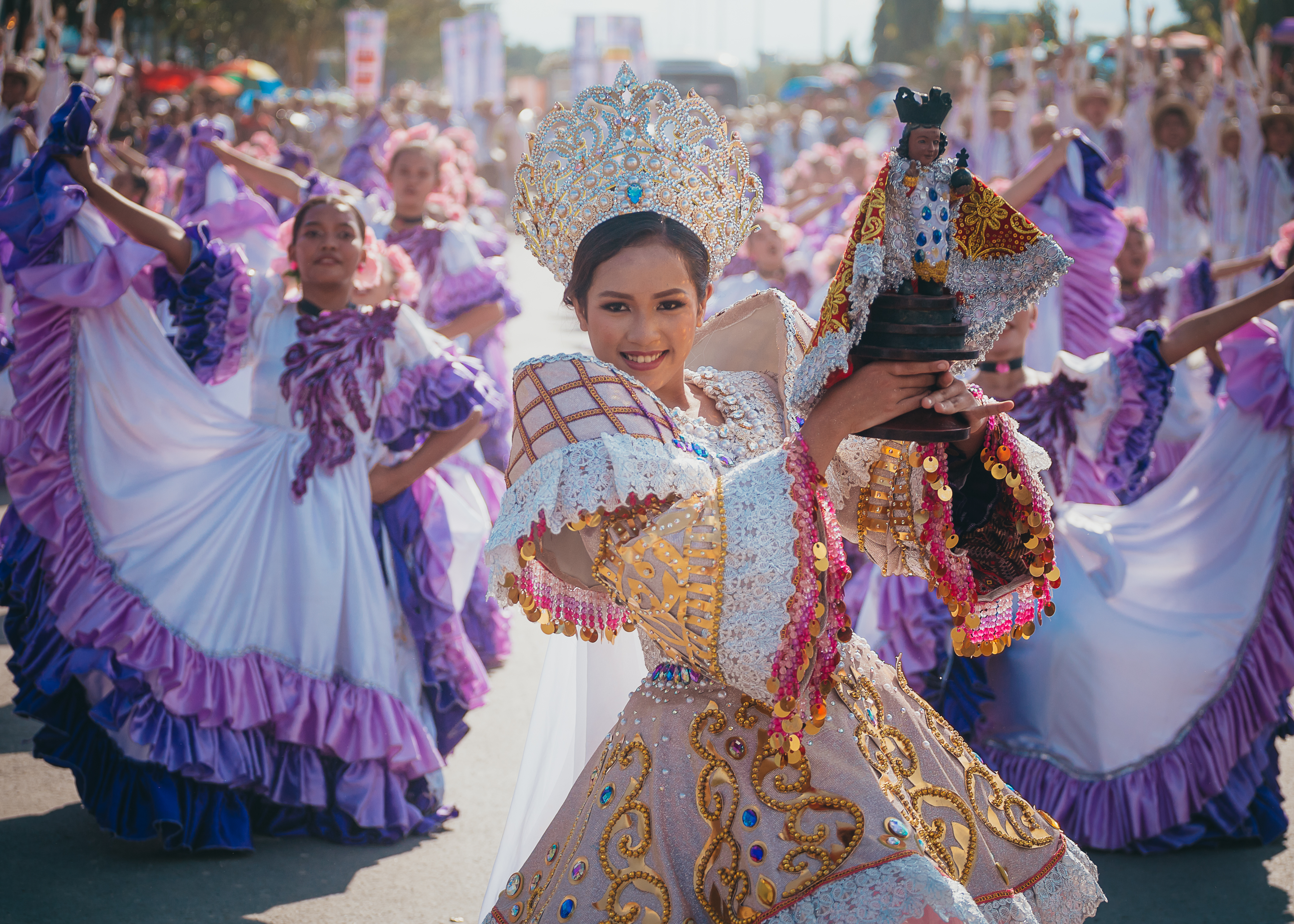
A modern traje de mestiza worn by a dancer in the 2023 Sinulog Festival of Cebu

== See also ==
- Fashion and clothing in the Philippines
- Barong tagalog
- Manila shawl
- Maria Clara gown
- China poblana
