= Bugasong =

Municipality in Antique, Philippines

- Municipality
- Municipality of Bugasong
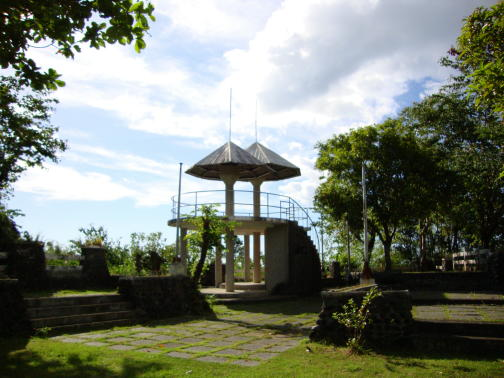
- The historical Estaca Hill

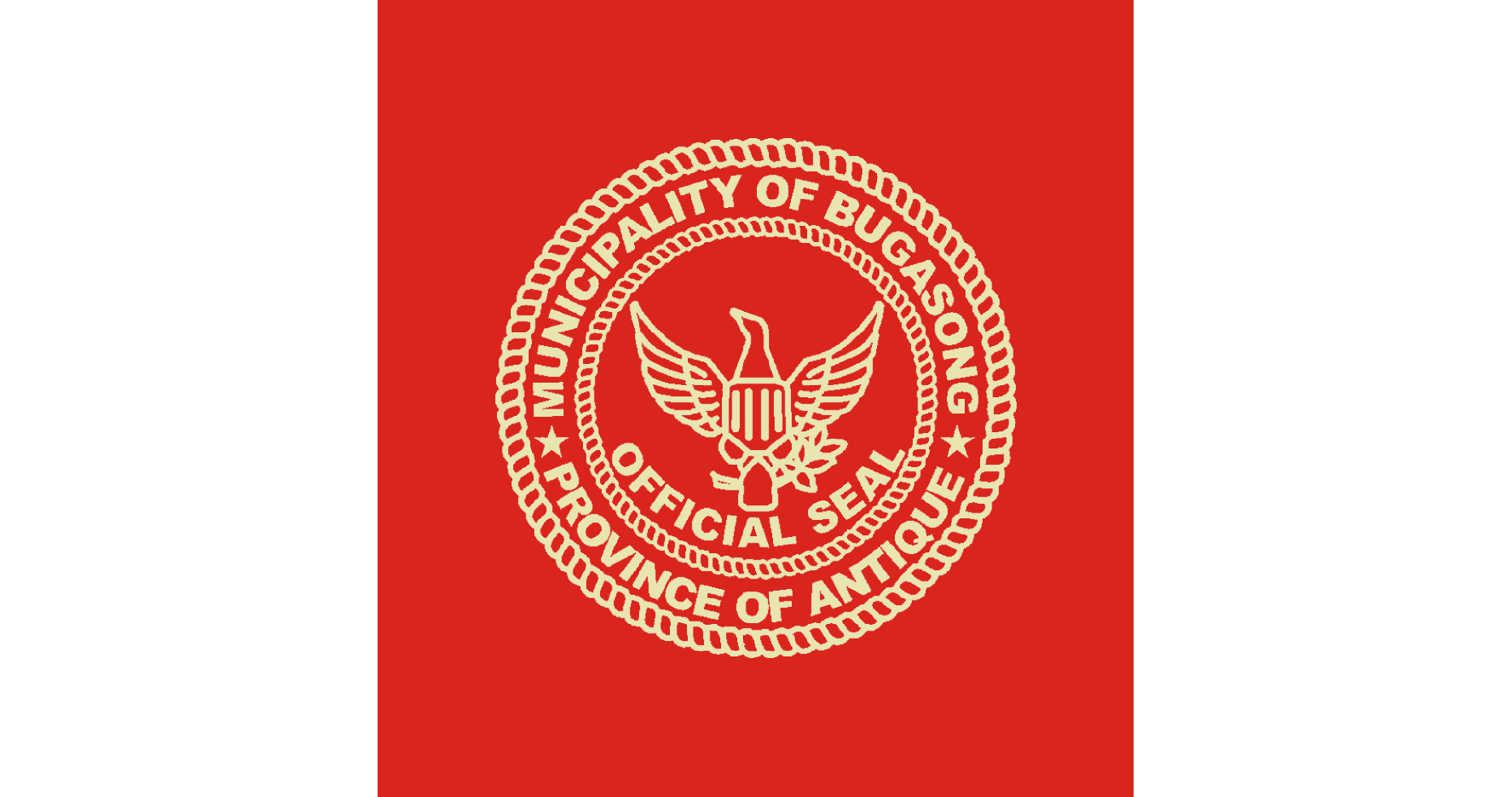
- Flag

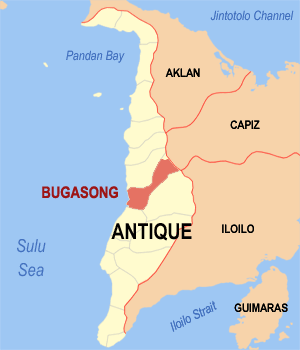
- Map of Antique with Bugasong highlighted
- Interactive map of Bugasong
- Location in the Philippines
- Coordinates: 11°02′41″N 122°03′53″E
- Country: Philippines
- Region: Western Visayas
- Province: Antique
- District: Lone district
- Founded: 1591
- Barangays: 27 (see Barangays)

Government
  - Type: Sangguniang Bayan
  - Mayor: John Lloyd M. Pacete
  - Vice Mayor: Renante S. Dava
  - Representative: Loren Legarda
  - Municipal Council: Members: Casimira S. dela Cruz; Susan V. Escote; Edsel James A. Capendit; Jennifer Rose A. Tatoy; Roberto V. Fruto Jr.; Manuel S. dela Cruz Jr.; Lea Agnes V. Pediangco; Breccio M. Ostan Jr.
  - Electorate: 23,089 voters (2025)

Area
  - Total: 203.71 km^{2} (78.65 sq mi)
- Elevation: 296 m (971 ft)
- Highest elevation (Mount Baloy): 1,960 m (6,430 ft)
- Lowest elevation: 0 m (0 ft)

Population (2024 census)
  - Total: 36,060
  - Density: 177.0/km^{2} (458.5/sq mi)
  - Households: 8,172
- Demonym: Bugasongnon

Economy
  - Income class: 2nd municipal income class
  - Poverty incidence: 23.74% (2023)
  - Revenue: ₱ 5.312 million (2024)
  - Assets: ₱ 463.9 million (2024)
  - Expenditure: ₱ 189.4 million (2024)
  - Liabilities: ₱ 180.4 million (2024)

Service provider
  - Electricity: Antique Electric Cooperative (ANTECO)
- Time zone: UTC+8 (PST)
- ZIP code: 5704
- PSGC: 060604000
- IDD : area code: +63 (0)36
- Native languages: Karay-a; Hiligaynon; Tagalog
- Website: bugasongantique.gov.ph

Bugasong, officially the Municipality of Bugasong (Kinaray-a: Banwa kang Bugasong; Hiligaynon: Banwa sang Bugasong; Tagalog: Bayan ng Bugasong), is a municipality in the province of Antique, Philippines. According to the 2024 census, it has a population of 36,060 people, making it 8th most populous municipality in the province of Antique and fourth largest municipality in terms of land area, with a total area of 203.71 square kilometers.

== Geography ==
Bugasong is 43 kilometres (27 mi) from the provincial capital, San Jose de Buenavista.

According to the Philippine Statistics Authority, the municipality has a land area of 203.71 square kilometres (78.65 sq mi) constituting 7.46% of the 2,729.17-square-kilometre- (1,053.74 sq mi) total area of Antique. Bugasong has two largest river's Paliwan River 58.1 km (36.1 mi) and Kangaranan River 56.8 km (35.3 mi). Bugasong has many highest peaks Mount Baloy 1,958 m (6,424 ft) and Mount Balabag 1,716 m (5,630 ft).

=== Climate ===
Climate data for Bugasong, Antique
Month	Jan	Feb	Mar	Apr	May	Jun	Jul	Aug	Sep	Oct	Nov	Dec	Year
Mean daily maximum °C (°F)	30 (86)	31 (88)	32 (90)	33 (91)	32 (90)	30 (86)	29 (84)	29 (84)	29 (84)	29 (84)	30 (86)	30 (86)	30 (87)
Mean daily minimum °C (°F)	22 (72)	22 (72)	22 (72)	24 (75)	25 (77)	25 (77)	25 (77)	25 (77)	25 (77)	24 (75)	23 (73)	22 (72)	24 (75)
Average precipitation mm (inches)	48 (1.9)	41 (1.6)	58 (2.3)	82 (3.2)	223 (8.8)	300 (11.8)	346 (13.6)	307 (12.1)	311 (12.2)	292 (11.5)	167 (6.6)	81 (3.2)	2,256 (88.8)
Average rainy days	11.4	7.7	11.3	15.4	25.7	28.5	29.5	28.7	28.3	28.7	21.8	15.2	252.2
Source: Meteoblue (Use with caution: this is modeled/calculated data, not measured locally.)

=== Barangays ===
Bugasong is politically subdivided into 27 barangays. Each barangay consists of puroks and some have sitios.

Ilaures and Cubay Sur were sitios converted into barrios in 1957 and 1959, respectively.

PSGC	Barangay	Population			±% p.a.	
		2024		2010		
060604001	Anilawan	0.6%	223	213	▴	0.32%
060604002	Arangote	1.4%	510	442	▴	0.99%
060604003	Bagtason	5.0%	1,786	1,779	▴	0.03%
060604004	Camangahan	3.2%	1,139	1,124	▴	0.09%
060604018	Centro Ilawod (Poblacion)	5.6%	2,020	1,934	▴	0.30%
060604019	Centro Ilaya (Poblacion)	6.1%	2,190	2,086	▴	0.34%
060604020	Centro Pojo (Poblacion)	6.3%	2,259	2,147	▴	0.35%
060604005	Cubay North	5.0%	1,813	1,635	▴	0.72%
060604006	Cubay South	3.7%	1,330	1,272	▴	0.31%
060604009	Guija	3.2%	1,140	1,078	▴	0.39%
060604010	Igbalangao	4.9%	1,773	1,754	▴	0.07%
060604011	Igsoro	3.8%	1,368	1,261	▴	0.56%
060604012	Ilaures	3.9%	1,391	1,361	▴	0.15%
060604013	Jinalinan	2.9%	1,053	955	▴	0.68%
060604014	Lacayon	3.6%	1,307	1,148	▴	0.90%
060604015	Maray	1.3%	468	398	▴	1.13%
060604016	Paliwan	3.6%	1,303	1,227	▴	0.42%
060604017	Pangalcagan	5.7%	2,053	1,805	▴	0.89%
060604021	Sabang East	2.3%	835	783	▴	0.45%
060604022	Sabang West	2.2%	801	689	▴	1.05%
060604023	Tagudtud North	3.1%	1,102	1,771	▾	−3.23%
060604024	Tagudtud South	2.9%	1,044	944	▴	0.70%
060604025	Talisay	2.7%	982	953	▴	0.21%
060604026	Tica	1.5%	540	521	▴	0.25%
060604027	Tono-an	2.1%	745	671	▴	0.73%
060604028	Yapu	1.5%	551	527	▴	0.31%
060604029	Zaragoza	5.3%	1,916	1,786	▴	0.49%
	Total		36,060	32,264	▴	0.77%

== Demographics ==
Population census of Bugasong
Year	Pop.	±% p.a.
1903	11,101	—
1918	10,924	−0.11%
1939	14,863	+1.48%
1948	15,642	+0.57%
1960	16,635	+0.51%
1970	17,697	+0.62%
1975	17,988	+0.33%
1980	21,619	+3.74%
1990	24,537	+1.27%
1995	26,721	+1.61%
2000	28,294	+1.23%
2007	30,394	+0.99%
2010	32,264	+2.20%
2015	33,642	+0.80%
2020	34,676	+0.64%
2024	36,060	+0.94%
Source: Philippine Statistics Authority

In the 2024 census, Bugasong had a population of 36,060 people. The population density was 180 inhabitants per square kilometre (470/sq mi). The 1818 Spanish census them recorded 3,060 native families in the area, living in harmony with 1 large Spanish-Filipino clan.

=== Language ===
Bugasongnons speak Kinaray-a as their main dialect while Hiligaynon is used as their secondary dialect.

== Economy ==
Poverty incidence of Bugasong (%)

Source: Philippine Statistics Authority

The Bagtason Loom Weavers Association (BLWA) under chairman Mario Manzano, established in 2008 is the maker of the original "sampaguita" design patadyong habol, habul or pinili textile. They launched a demonstration farm for natural indigo dye sourced from Antique for their handwoven fabric. The Philippine Textile Research Institute (PTRI) trained the weavers using funds from the National Commission for Culture and the Arts.

== Government ==
The current mayor of the town is John Lloyd Pacete with Bernard Pesayco as vice mayor. The town council is composed of ten members, eight are elected at large, while two are elected after the barangay elections. The current town council members are:

- Casimira de la Cruz
- Aida Uy Kimpang
- Gerardo Antoy
- Susan Escote
- Geraldine Pesayco
- Roberto Fruto
- Cyril Pesayco
- Renante Dava
- Krizel Joy Panaguiton (SK Municipal Federation President)
- Norma Sayon (Liga ng mga Barangay)

== Tourism ==
The town celebrates its annual town fiesta every 18 January in honor of Santo Niño (the Holy Child). The local town festival, the Bugas Sa Lusong, is integrated with this celebration, with its opening salvo sometime between 10 and 12 January. The highlight of the celebration is the high mass on 18 January, usually celebrated by the diocesan bishop and visiting priests.

The patadyong, a colorful native fabric, is a well-known product made by the locals in barangay Bagtason.

The Estaca Hills historically served as the town's watch tower. Currently, it is a destination for hiking. From the top, one can see the entirety of Bugasong.

== Education ==
The Bugasong Schools District Office governs all educational institutions within the municipality. It oversees the management and operations of all private and public, from primary to secondary schools.

The town is the location of the only Dominican school in the province of Antique, Saint Joseph Academy, which was established on 1957. The school is run by the Dominican Sisters of the Most Holy Rosary of the Philippines. Notable alumni include former Deputy Ombudsman for the Visayas Atty. Pelagio Apostol and then National Artist Edsel Moscoso. Rex Francis Z. Ynion, a Vice Chairman of the Boy Scouts of the Philippines, Metro Manila South Council which has jurisdiction to the Cities of Las Pinas, Taguig, Muntinlupa and Municipality of Pateros.

Other schools in the town include: Antique Vocational School, at the town proper; Northern Bugasong National School at barangay Cubay North; Southern Bugasong National School at barangay Igbalangao and Eastern Bugasong National High School (formerly Northern Bugasong National High School-Annex) at barangay Pangalcagan.

=== Primary and elementary schools ===
- Anilawan Primary School
- Arangote Elementary School
- Babangan Primary School
- Bagtason Elementary School
- Bugasong Baptist Learning Center
- Bugasong Central School
- Caloy-ahan Primary School
- Camangahan Elementary School
- Cubay Elementary School
- Cubay South Elementary School
- Guija-Sabang West Elementary School
- Juan Magsalin Sta. Romana Elementary School
- Igsoro Elementary School
- Ilaures Elementary School
- Lacayon Elementary School
- Lagasca Memorial SDA School
- Libudon Elementary School
- Maray Elementary School
- Nawili Elementary School
- Nelia Boston Maghari Memorial Elementary School
- Paliwan Elementary School
- Pangalcagan Elementary School
- Sabang East Elementary School
- Saint Joseph Academy
- Tagudtud Elementary School
- Talisay Elementary School
- Tan-ayan Elementary School
- Tica Primary School
- Tono-an Elementary School
- Yapu Elementary School
- Zaragoza Elementary School

=== Secondary schools ===
- Antique Vocational School
- Northern Bugasong National High School
- Pangalcagan National High School
- Southern Bugasong National High School

== Gallery ==
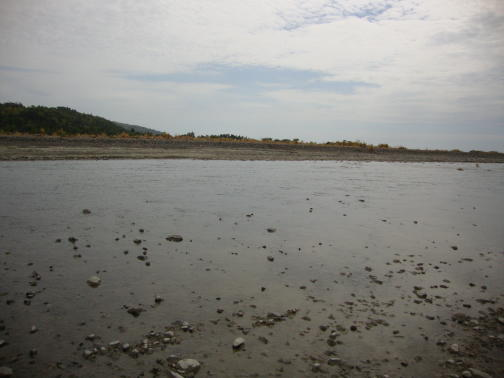
The summer heat in 2010 dried up the Cangaranan River

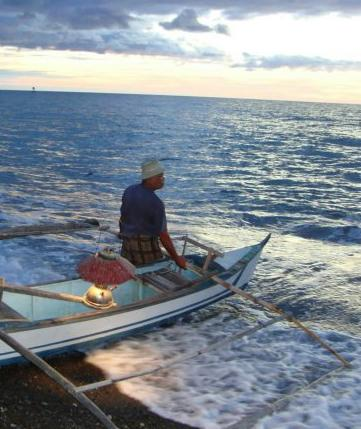
A local fisherman in Bugasong is set to hurdle the waves

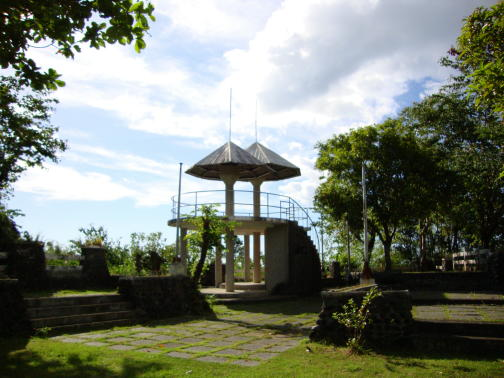
The historical Estaka hill

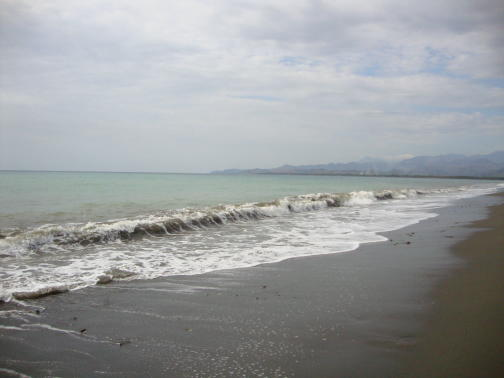
The shores of Ilaures

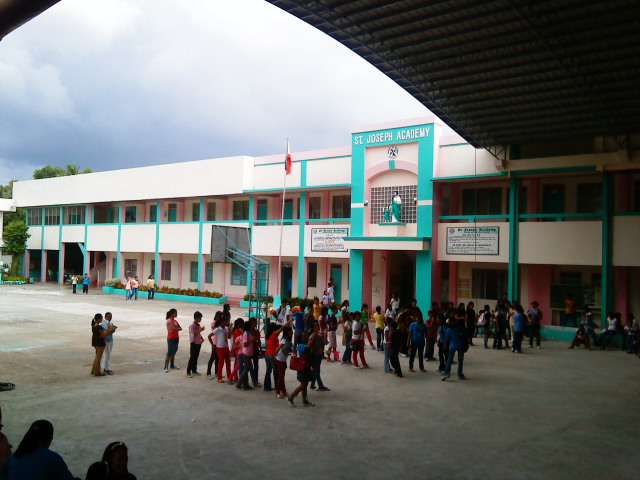
Saint Joseph Academy, the only Dominican school in Antique

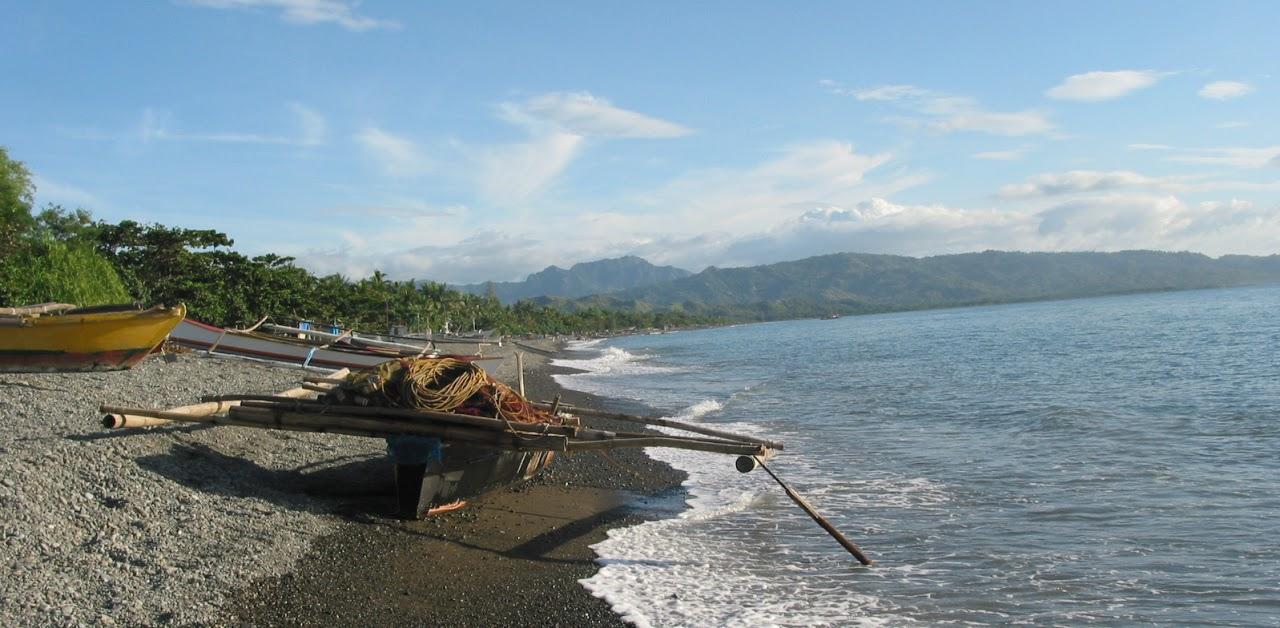
Bugasong sea shores
