= Malong =

Traditional Filipino skirt

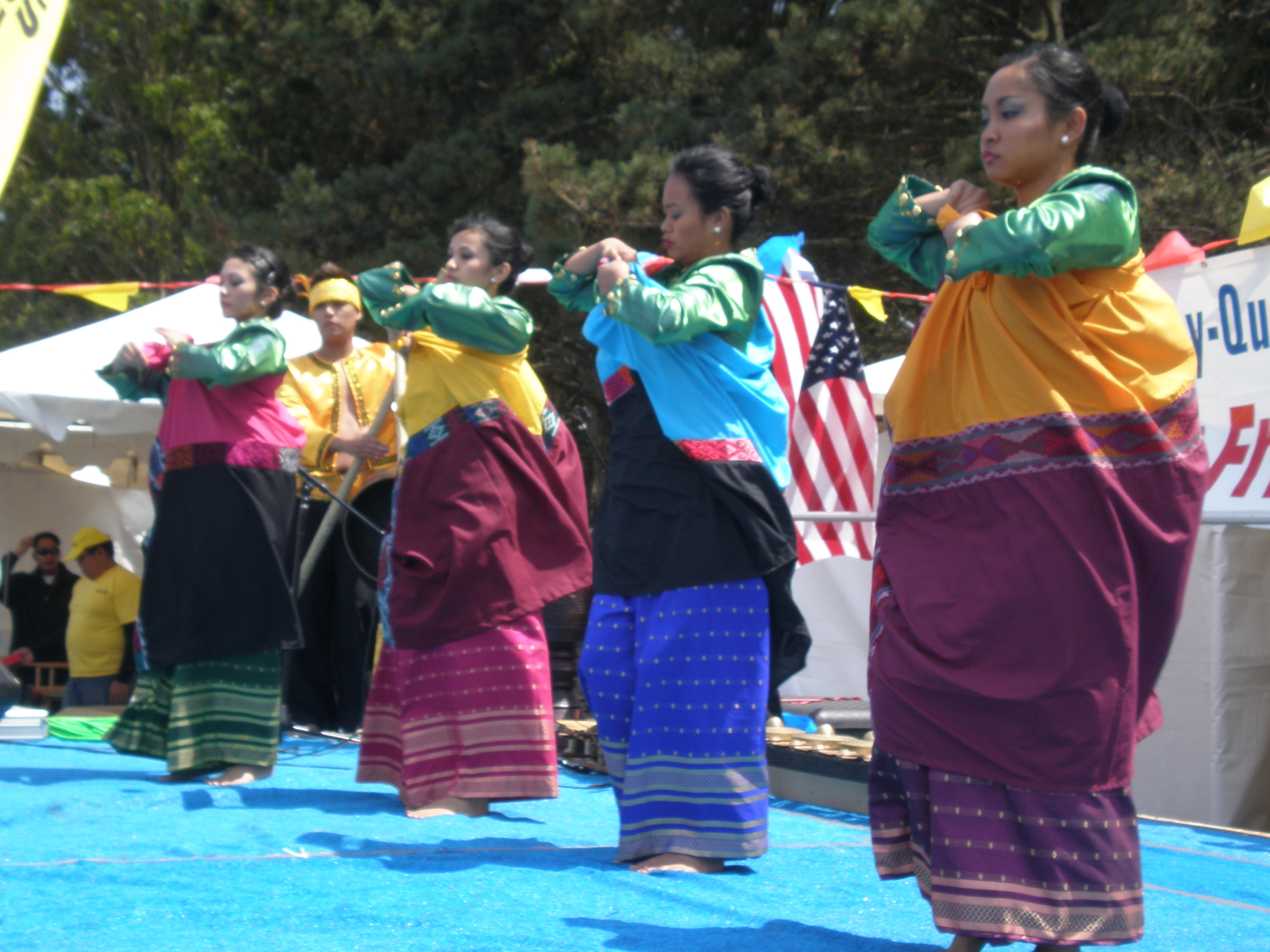
Dancers performing the kapa malong malong, a traditional Maguindanao dance featuring the uses of the malong

The malong is a traditional Filipino-Bangsamoro rectangular or tube-like wraparound skirt bearing a variety of geometric or okir designs. The malong is traditionally used as a garment by both men and women of the numerous ethnic groups in the mainland Mindanao and parts of the Sulu Archipelago. They are wrapped around at waist or chest-height and secured by tucked ends, with belts of braided material or other pieces of cloth, or are knotted over one shoulder. They were traditionally hand-woven, with the patterns usually distinctive to a particular ethnic group. However, modern malong are usually machine-made or even imported, with patterns that mimic the traditional local designs.

== Description ==
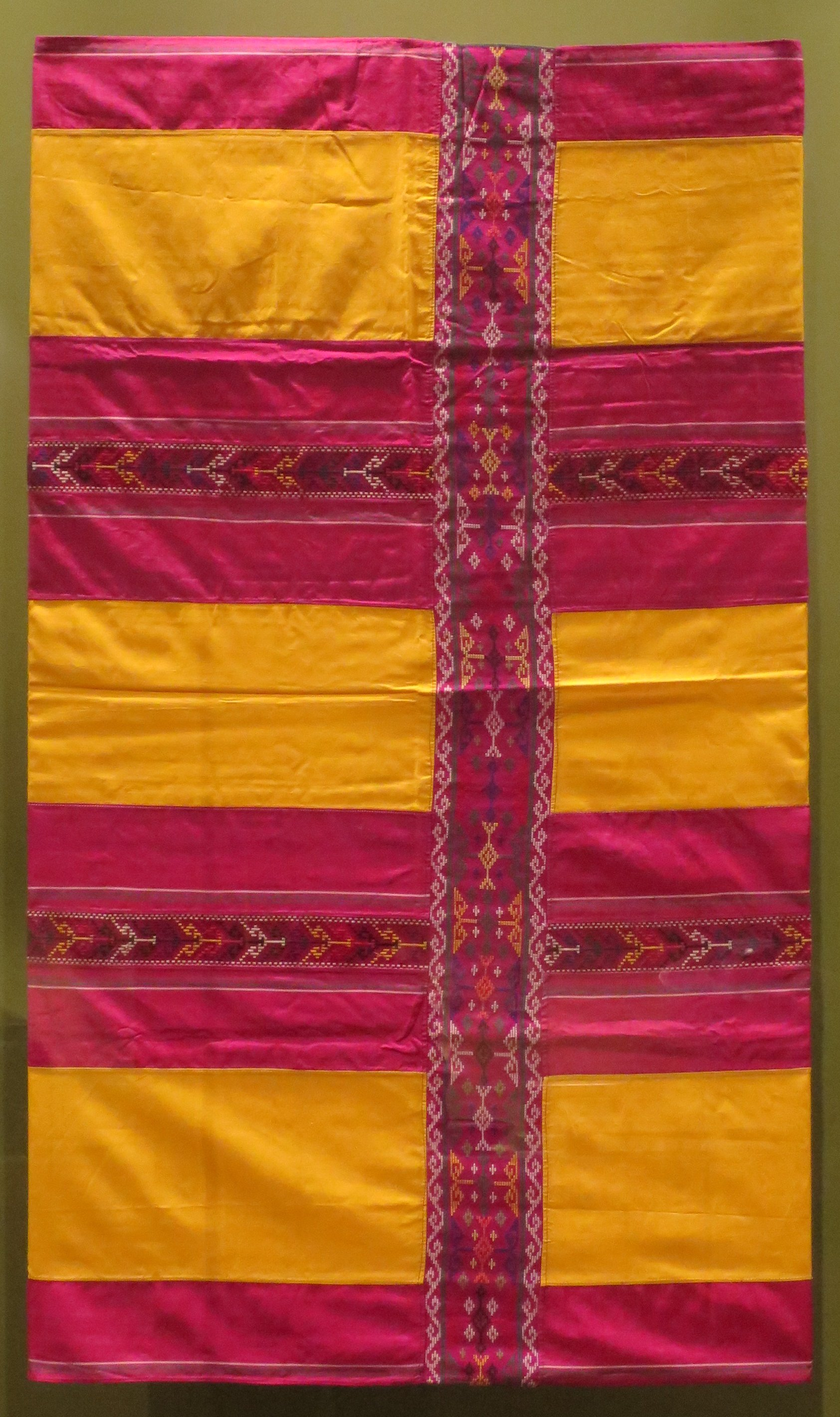
Mid-20th century malong made from rayon

Handwoven malongs are made by Maranao, Maguindanaon, and T'boli weavers on a backstrap loom. The pattern or style of the malong may indicate the weaver's tribal origin, such as the Maranao malong landap. Very rare malong designs and styles can indicate the village in which the malong was made, for example, the extremely intricate malong rawatan made only by a handful of Maranao weavers in Lanao del Sur and the handmade fabric inaul decorated with colorful designs by the Maguindanao weavers in the Maguindanao del Norte and Maguindanao del Sur provinces. Handwoven malongs, which are costly, are likely to be used only at social functions, to display the social and economic status of the wearer. While modern malongs are made of cotton and Lurex threads, some contemporary handwoven malongs are made of inexpensive rayon thread, to reduce the manufacturing cost to the weaver and ultimate cost to the consumer. There are many grades of cotton thread, and the cost of a malong can also be reduced by using the lesser grades of cotton thread, or by creating a loose or coarse weave.

Machine-made printed cotton malongs are made in Indonesia specifically for export to the Philippines, and are commonly referred to as "batik" because the item is imported; those inexpensive machine-made malongs are used for everyday purposes. The designs of traditional handwoven malongs are used in imported cotton from Thailand, allowing the purchaser to have a cotton machine-printed malong which, from a distance, convincingly mimics the look of a much more expensive handwoven malong.

== Uses ==
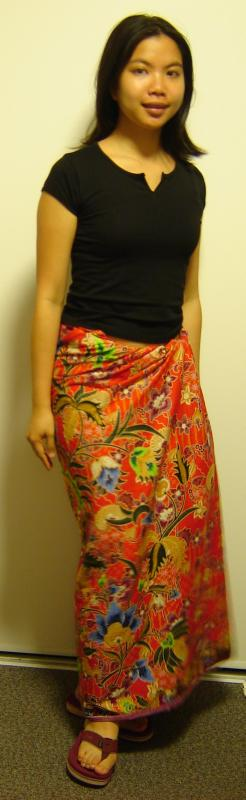
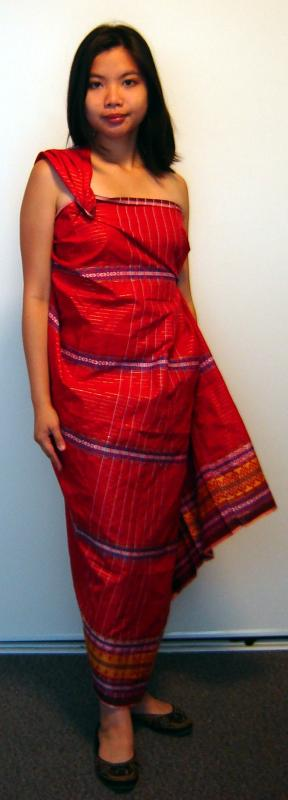
Two styles of wearing a malong

The malong can function as a skirt for both men and women, a turban, Niqab, Hijab, a dress, a blanket, a sunshade, a bedsheet, a "dressing room", a hammock, a prayer mat, and other purposes. A newborn is wrapped in a malong, and as he grows this piece of cloth becomes a part of his daily life. When he dies, he is once again wrapped in a malong. Among traditional tribal peoples, the malong is used in everyday life. Even in areas where people wear Western-style clothing during the day, the malong is commonly used as sleepwear. The malong is also used in very big festivals, they wear this to show respect. Two are represented in the Ayala Museum Collection: The "malong a andon" on the left, and the "malong a landap" on the right.

== Similar clothing ==
Similar wraparound skirts were also worn by other Filipino ethnic groups in the pre-colonial period, like the identical Visayan and Tausug patadyong and the shorter Tagalog tapis. However, most of these later evolved into a component of the baro't saya worn over a longer skirt (the saya or falda) due to Spanish influence. Some of them survive among more isolated highlander groups like among the Ifugao people.

The malong and other Philippine wraparound skirts are related to the sarong worn by peoples in other parts of Maritime Southeast Asia (Malaysia, Brunei, East Timor, and Indonesia), as well as the barkcloth skirts worn by other Austronesian peoples like the direct Polynesian cognate malo or lavalava.

== See also ==
- Dhoti
- Sarong
