= Patadyong =

Traditional wrap skirt worn by indigenous women of the Philippines

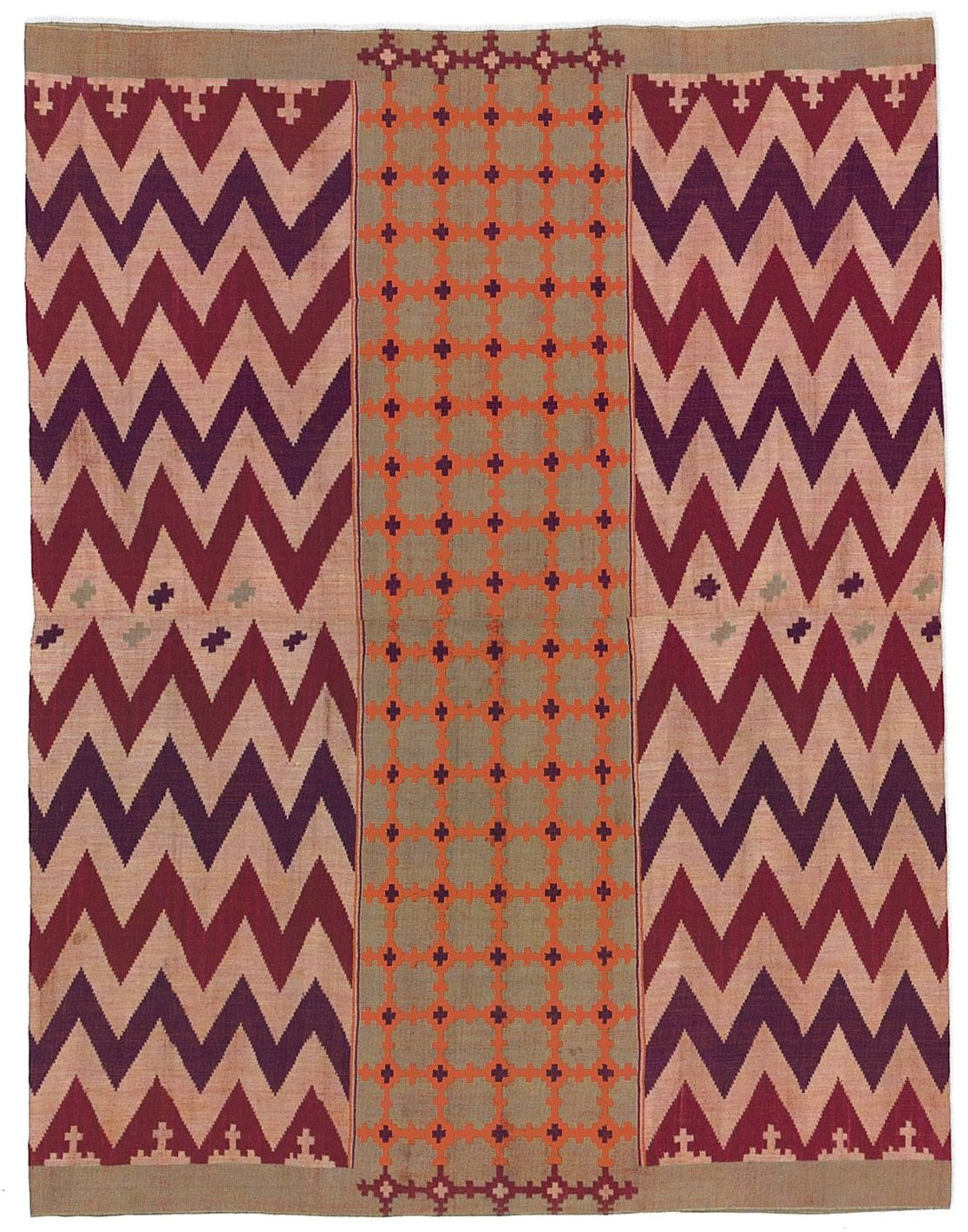
A patadyong from the Sulu Archipelago, Philippines

The patadyong (Tagalog pronunciation: [pɐ.t̪ɐˈd͡ʒoŋ], also called patadyung, patadjong, habol, or habul), is an indigenous rectangular or tube-like wraparound skirt worn by both men and women of the Visayas and the Sulu Archipelago of the Philippines, similar to the Malong, or Sarong. It was also historically worn in parts of Luzon like Pampanga and Sorsogon.

In the precolonial Philippines, it was usually worn with a barú or bayú, a simple collar-less shirt or jacket with close-fitting long sleeves. During the Spanish period, this evolved into the kimona, a variant of the baro't saya worn by Christianized lowland Visayans consisting of a loose translucent blouse, an undershirt, and a patadyong or a patadyong-patterned skirt.

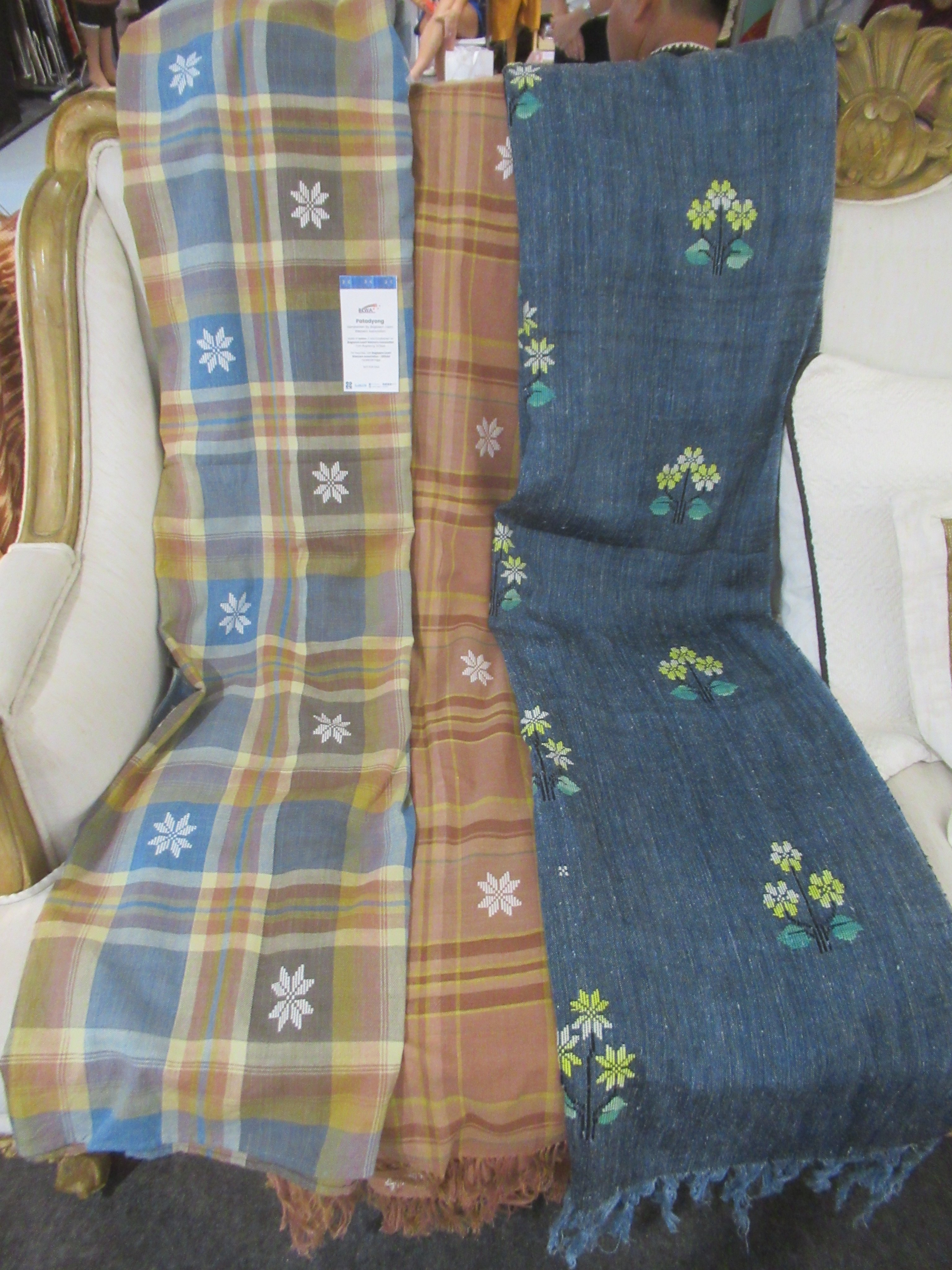
A patadyong from Bugasong

The patadyong is identical to the malong used in mainland Mindanao, but is longer than the tapis of Luzon; it is also identical to the sarong of neighboring Indonesia, Brunei, and Malaysia, for which only the designating name changes (patadyong in Bisayan languages vs. sarong in Malay language). Its name means "straight [in shape]" in Bisayan languages, from the root word tadlong, "[to go] straight"; its alternative name "habol" or "habul" means "woven [textile]", though it usually means "blanket" in modern Bisayan.

The Bugasong Loom Weavers Association was founded in 2008 to revive the traditional loom of patadyong, along with their trademark pinili pattern. As a cultural treasure, it is so versatile that it has been used as room divider, baby sling, and for rice harvest bundling.Cebu Pacific introduced its QR Flight codes patterned after traditional weaving of Antique Province's checkered Patadyong to promote local tourism.

== See also ==
- Dhoti
- Sarong
- Barong tagalog
- Baro't saya
- Maria Clara gown
