= Tapis (Philippine clothing) =

Dress in traditional Luzon cultures

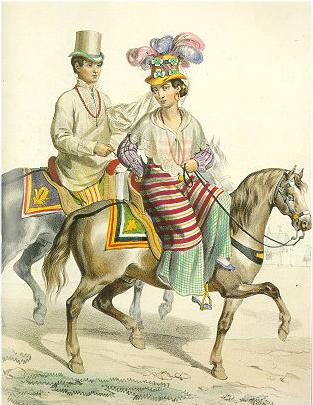
French illustration of a Spanish Filipino mestizo couple c. 1846, showing the traditional way of wearing the tapis by the ladies.

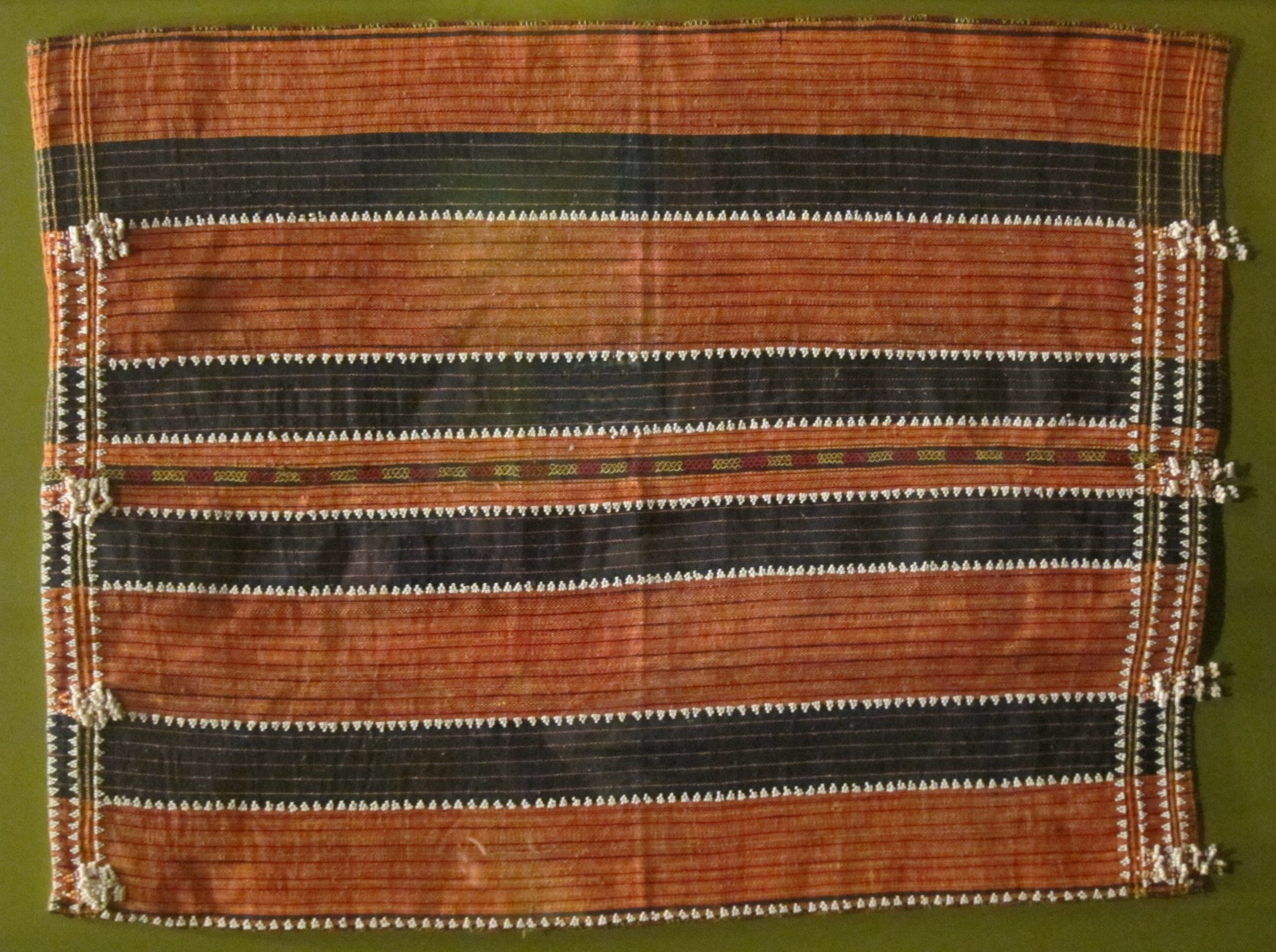
Cordilleran alampay in the Honolulu Museum of Art

Tapis across various cultures in the Philippines may generally refer to a single, rectangular piece of cloth one wraps around oneself as clothing, but is also the term for a colorful, hand-woven wraparound skirt common in the pre-colonial period, and which is still used today as part of the María Clara gown and by culturally conservative tribes.

The tapis worn by the Cordilleran women of Northern Luzon, known locally as the alampay, are the most prominent surviving example.

It is worn by wrapping the cloth around one's waist and holding the ends together by means of a tightly tied sash. It generally reaches down to the knees. The woven pattern of a tapis describes the culture and temperament of the wearer's tribe.

== Broader usage (verb) ==
Another use of the term, as a verb, simply means to wrap a piece of cloth around one's body to cover it up. A person who does so is said to be nagtatapis ('putting on a tapis'). This usage of the term does not require that the piece of cloth be a traditional tapis, and can refer to being wrapped in a blanket or towel.

== In historical records ==
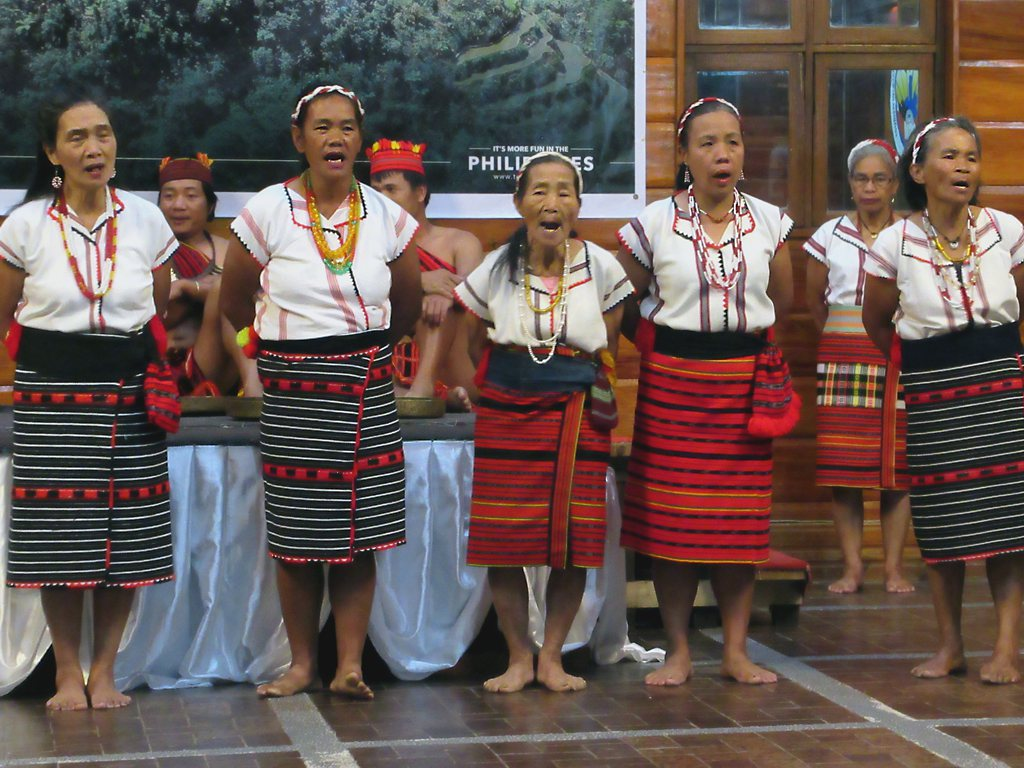
Ifugao women in Banaue wearing alampay

The Tapis has been in use in the Philippine archipelago since at least the indigenous period before the arrival of Europeans. Spanish chroniclers from the period noted that this mode of dress remained common on many islands despite Spanish efforts to introduce what they considered more suitable clothing. They felt that the tight profile of the tapis on a female wearer was revealing and immodest, and made even worse by the often sheer fabric of the cloth. One noted that the tapis became even more revealing whenever the wearer was caught in the rain, or had just taken a bath. The locals, however, did not consider the revealing properties of the tapis to be immodest. Among the lowland peoples who came under the full influence of Spain, this would soon change as Christianization and Hispanization forced a much more conservative cultural imperialism, and along with it, a mode of dress that emphasized a Christian-colonial sense of subjective modesty. The tapis would continue to be worn, but not in public, and usually only in more intimate settings such as one's own house. The tapis saw continued use among upland peoples, but as their environments are colder, their variations of the tapis tended to be thicker and thus less revealing.

== See also ==
- Bahag (garment)
- Patadyong
- Malong
- Abacá
- Batik
- Inabel
- Pañuelo
- Piña
- T'nalak
- Hablon
