= Lepanto =

Lepanto may refer to:

== Places ==
- Lepanto, Greece, medieval Italian name of Nafpaktos
- Lepanto, Arkansas, United States
- Lepanto, a sub-province in the former province of Lepanto-Bontoc, Philippines (now part of Mankayan, Benguet)
- Lepanto (Rome Metro), an underground station
- Mount Lepanto, Antarctica

== Ships ==
- Italian ship Lepanto, more than one Italian naval ship
- Spanish ship Lepanto, more than one Spanish Navy ship

== Other uses ==
- Lepanto (poem), a poem by English poet G. K. Chesterton about the 1571 Battle of Lepanto
- Lepanto opening, in the board game Diplomacy
- Battle of Lepanto, a naval battle between the Holy League and the Ottoman Empire in 1571
- The Battle of Lepanto (Luna painting), an 1887 painting by Juan Luna

== See also ==
- Battle of Lepanto (disambiguation)
