= Hymen (disambiguation) =

The hymen is a fold of mucous membrane that surrounds or partially covers the external vaginal opening.

Hymen may also refer to:

== People ==
- Frederic Hymen Cowen (1852–1935), British pianist, conductor and composer
- Hymen Lipman (1817–1893), American inventor
- Hymen Marx (1925–2007), American herpetologist
- Hymen B. Mintz (1909–1986), American politician
- Slymenstra Hymen (born 1966), female dancer and occasional vocalist of the heavy metal band Gwar

== Other uses ==
- Hymen (god), the god of marriage ceremonies in Greek mythology
- Hymen, an alternative title for a version of Handel's 1740 opera Imeneo
- Hymenoptera, an order of insects
- Hymen Records, an imprint of the record label Ant-Zen, distributed by IRIS

== See also ==
- Hyman, a given name and surname
- Hymen o Hymenee an 1889 painting by Filipino painter Juan Luna
- Heyman, Iran, a village in Hormozgan Province
