= Naupactus (disambiguation) =

Naupactus is an ancient Greek town.

Naupactus may also refer to:

- Nafpaktos, the modern town built upon the site of ancient Naupactus
- the Battle of Naupactus, a 429 BCE Athenian victory in the Peloponnesian War
- the beetle genus Naupactus (beetle) of the family Curculionidae

== See also ==
- Lepanto (disambiguation)
- Battle of Lepanto (disambiguation)
