= Hymen, oh Hyménée! =

1889 painting by Juan Luna

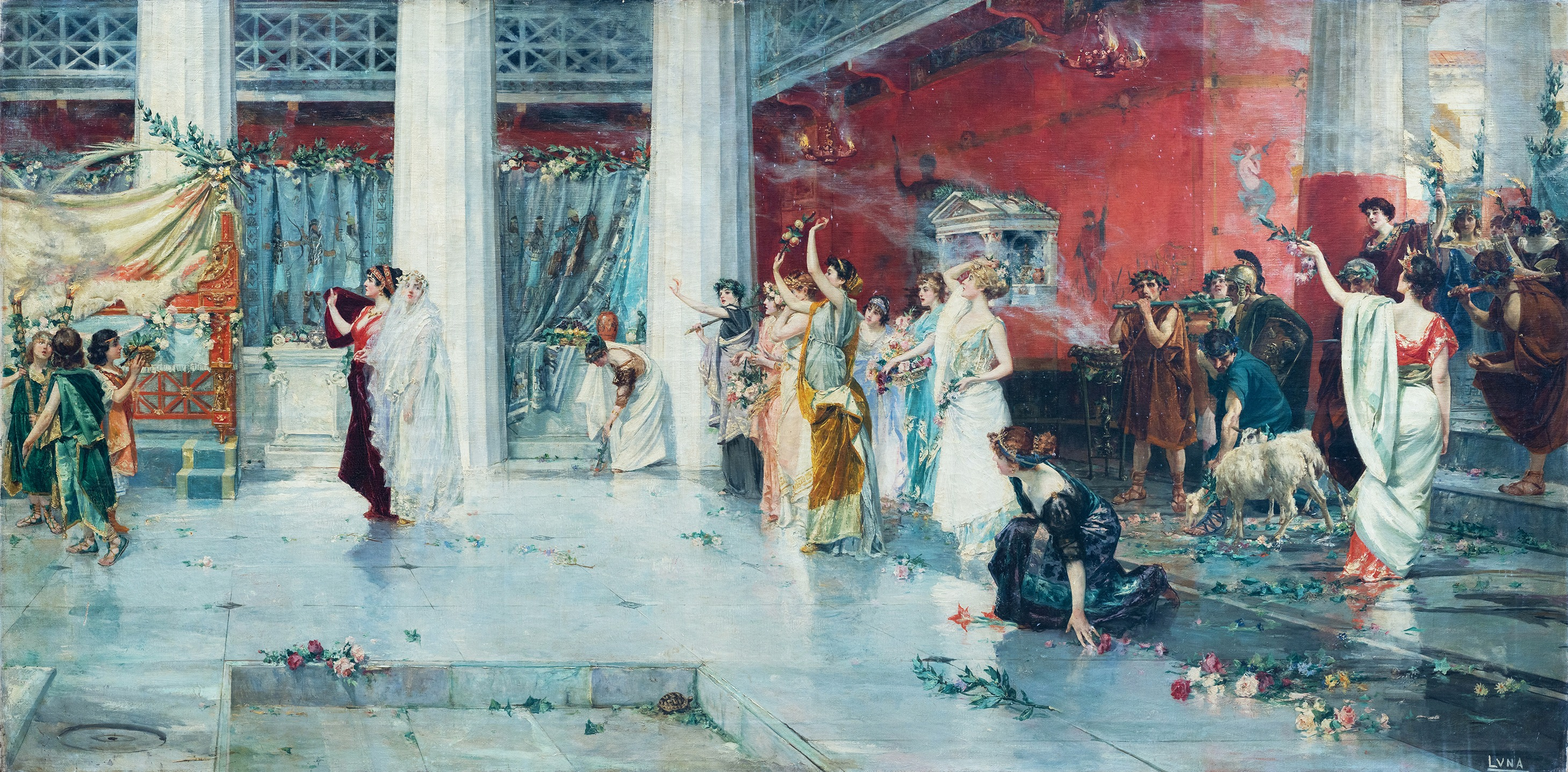
- Artist: Juan Luna
- Year: 1886–87
- Medium: Oil on canvas
- Dimensions: 1.25 m × 2.505 m (4.1 ft × 8.22 ft)
- Location: Private collection of Jaime Ponce de Leon

Hymen, oh Hyménée!, also known as Boda Romana, is a painting by Filipino painter Juan Luna. Luna, working on canvas, started in 1886 and later completed in 1887 during the artist's honeymoon in Venice after his wedding to Paz Pardo de Tavera. The painting was submitted by Luna to the Exposition Universelle in 1889 in Paris, France, where it garnered a bronze medal. The picture recreates a scene of a Roman wedding ritual specifically the bride's entrance into the groom's home.

== Description ==
Hymen, oh Hyménée! is a history painting done in the historical realism style, which is closely associated with Luna's earlier notable works such as Spoliarium (1884) and The Death of Cleopatra (1881). This artwork portrays a scene from a Roman wedding ritual, specifically the moment when the bride is entering the groom's chamber. The painting draws upon the ancient tradition of invoking Hymen, the Roman god of marriage, through nuptial songs dating back to the 5th century BCE. Its title is inspired by a wedding chant composed by the Roman poet Catullus.

Luna's deep interest in the Greco-Roman world, fostered by his tutelage under Spanish history painter Alejo Vera, motivated him to delve into the artistic heritage of Rome and Pompeii. This exploration prompted Luna to personally visit these ancient cities, where he absorbed their vibrant history and integrated their influences into his artistic creations.

In 1886, Luna tied the knot with Paz Pardo de Tavera, the heiress of a prominent Filipino family residing in Paris. Despite initial resistance from Paz's mother, Luna was eventually accepted into the family. It was during their honeymoon in Venice that Luna commenced the creation of Hymen, oh Hyménée! which was eventually finished by early 1887.

In 1889, Luna received an invitation to exhibit his artworks as part of the Spanish exhibition at the Palace of Fine Arts in the 1889 Exposition Universelle in Paris, commemorating the centennial of the French Revolution. Initially, Luna had hoped to showcase his larger-scale works, such as Spoliarium and The Battle of Lepanto, but those plans did not materialize. As a result, Luna submitted smaller works, including Hymen, oh Hyménée! for the exhibition. The painting was later honored with the distinction of hors concours (out of competition) and received a Third Class medal (bronze medal) in recognition of its artistic merit.

== Loss and rediscovery ==
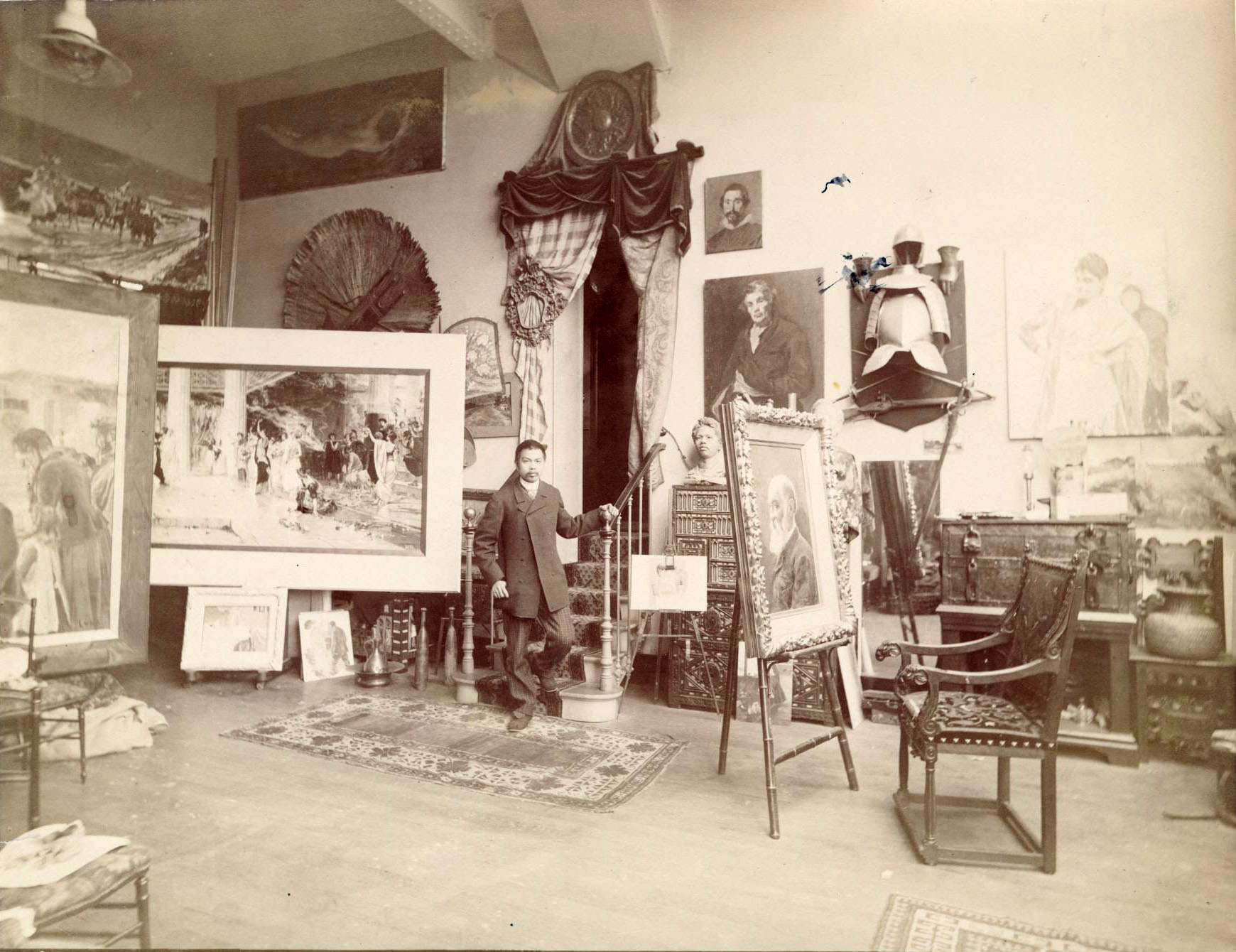
Hymen, oh Hyménée! is displayed in Luna's studio in Paris.

After its exhibition in 1889, the painting remained in the possession of the artist until his death in Hong Kong in 1899. Afterwards, there was no word on what happened to the painting. There were two plausible scenarios regarding its fate. One possibility is that the painting was destroyed along with other works by Luna by the Pardo de Tavera family following his double murder of Paz and her mother, Juliana Gorricho in 1892. Another possibility is that the painting was listed in a French museum but subsequently lost during the World Wars.

Subsequently, a Spanish aristocratic family obtained ownership of the artwork during the 1920s. However, it resurfaced in the 1970s when Philippine collector Eleuterio Pascual rediscovered it. Pascual expressed interest in acquiring the painting, but the family declined to sell. In the 1990s, a private collector from the Philippines made an attempt to purchase the artwork from the family's heirs, but their offer was once again refused.

In 2014, Jaime Ponce de Leon, the founder of the Philippine-based auction house León Gallery, acquired the painting from the heirs of the said European family. Following a meticulous three-year authentication process, Ponce de Leon purchased the artwork and returned it to the Philippines in 2017. The painting was then stored in a private facility in the Philippines until October 2022, when Ponce de Leon eventually agreed to have it publicly displayed. In 2023, the painting was loaned to the Ayala Museum for a period of three years and was publicly exhibited from 12 June 2023 to 24 March 2024 and for a second time from 7 to 16 October 2025.

== Sources ==
- Aguilar Cruz, Emilio (1975). Luna. Manila: Department of Public Information.
- Dumas, F.G. (1889). Exposition Universelle de 1889: Catalogue illustre des Beaux-Arts. Lille: L. Danel.
- Mina, Marinella Andrea C.; Arnaldo, Martin; Ocampo, Ambeth R.; Samson, Ditas R.; Ente, Marie Julienne B. (2023). Splendor: Juan Luna, Painter as Hero. Makati City: Ayala Foundation, Inc. ISBN 978-1-111-83169-1.
- Pilar, Santiago Albano (1980). Juan Luna: The Filipino as a Painter. Pasig City: Eugenio Lopez Foundation, Inc.
- Storer, Russel; Chikiamco, Clarissa; Hafiz, Syed Muhammad (2017). Between Worlds: Raden Saleh and Juan Luna. Singapore: National Gallery Singapore. ISBN 9789811146848.
