= Benet Mercadé =

Spanish painter

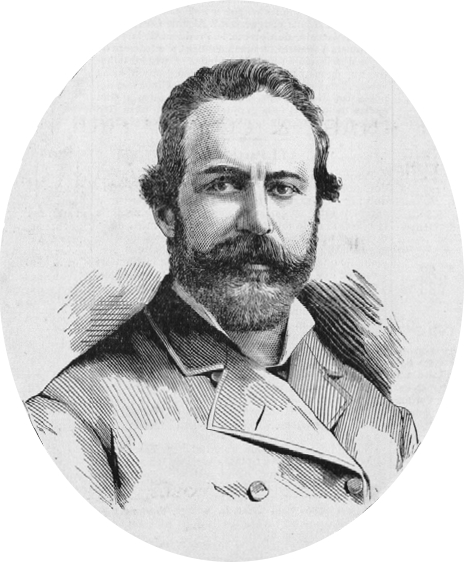
Benet Mercadé, from La Llumanera de Nova York (1880)

Benet Mercadé i Fàbrega, in Spanish: Benito Mercadé y Fábregas (1821 – 10 December 1897) was a Catalan painter of portraits and historical scenes.

== Biography ==
Mercadé was born in La Bisbal d'Empordà. His father was a painter and gilder. In 1838, he moved to Barcelona, where he worked as a shoemaker's assistant while beginning his studies at the Escola de la Llotja, doing some occasional ornamental painting and making daguerrotypes. He later attended the Escuela de Bellas Artes de San Fernando in Madrid, where he studied with Carlos Luis de Ribera.

His first major exhibition came in 1852 and, a year later, he settled in Madrid. In 1858, he participated in the National Exhibition of Fine Arts, presenting two major works, one on Don Quixote and one on Columbus, the latter of which gained an "honorable mention". He would continue to participate in the National Exhibitions until 1876. He obtained the Grand Prize at an exposition in Paris in 1866 with the "Traslación de San Francisco de Asís" (The Passing of Saint Francis of Assisi).

From 1863 to 1869, he lived in Rome where he frequented the Antico Caffè Greco, meeting with other painters and writers from Spain such as Dióscoro Puebla, José Casado del Alisal, Eduardo Rosales, Vicente Palmaroli, Marià Fortuny and Alejo Vera. He returned to Barcelona because of his increasingly poor eyesight, and eventually had to stop painting, but still obtained a full professorship at the Escola in 1882.

He was initially influenced by the Nazarene movement, but later switched to Realism, focusing on religious and historic themes. He died in Barcelona, aged 76. A street in Barcelona is named after him.

== Selected paintings ==
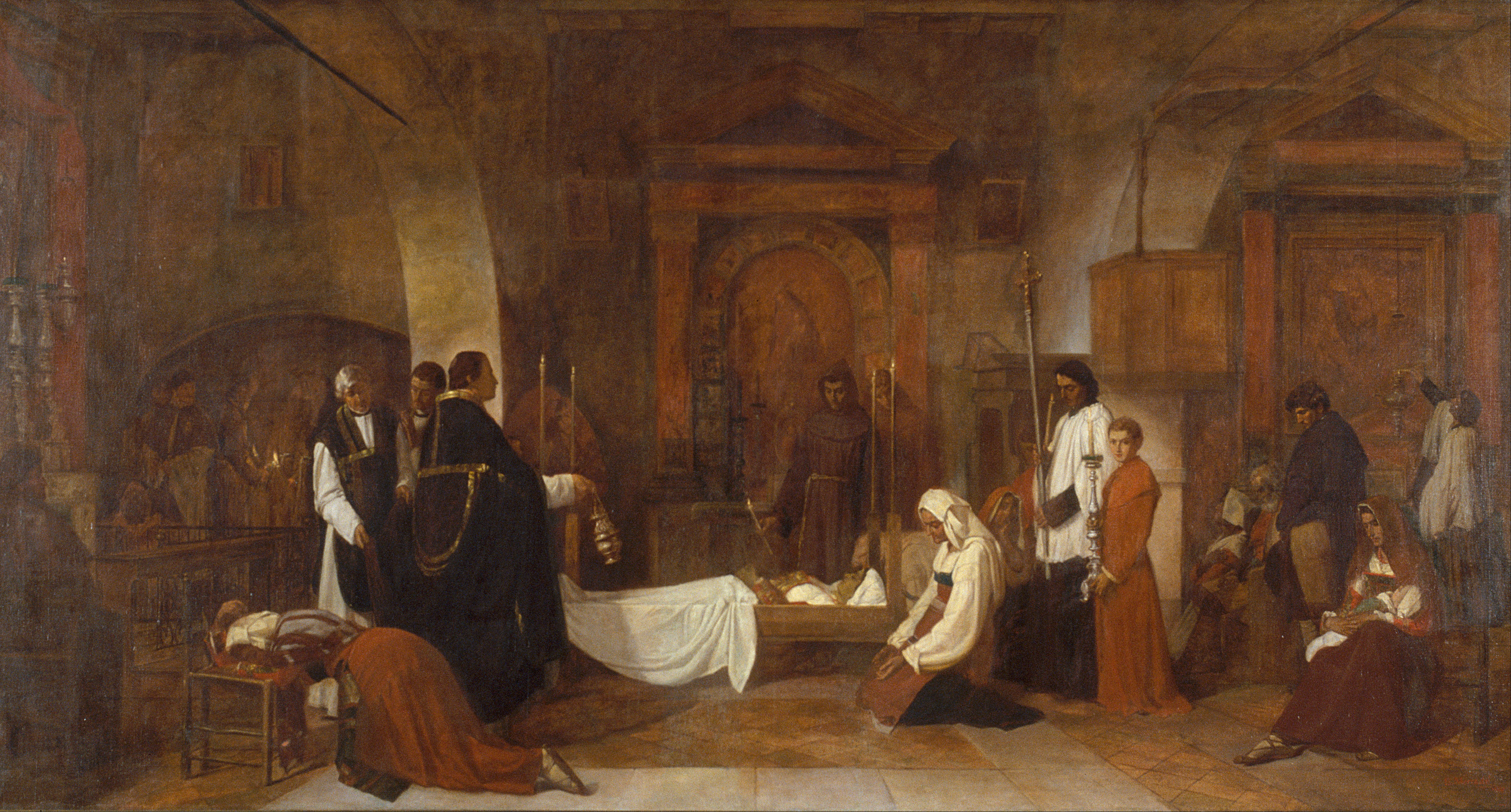
The Wake (1864)

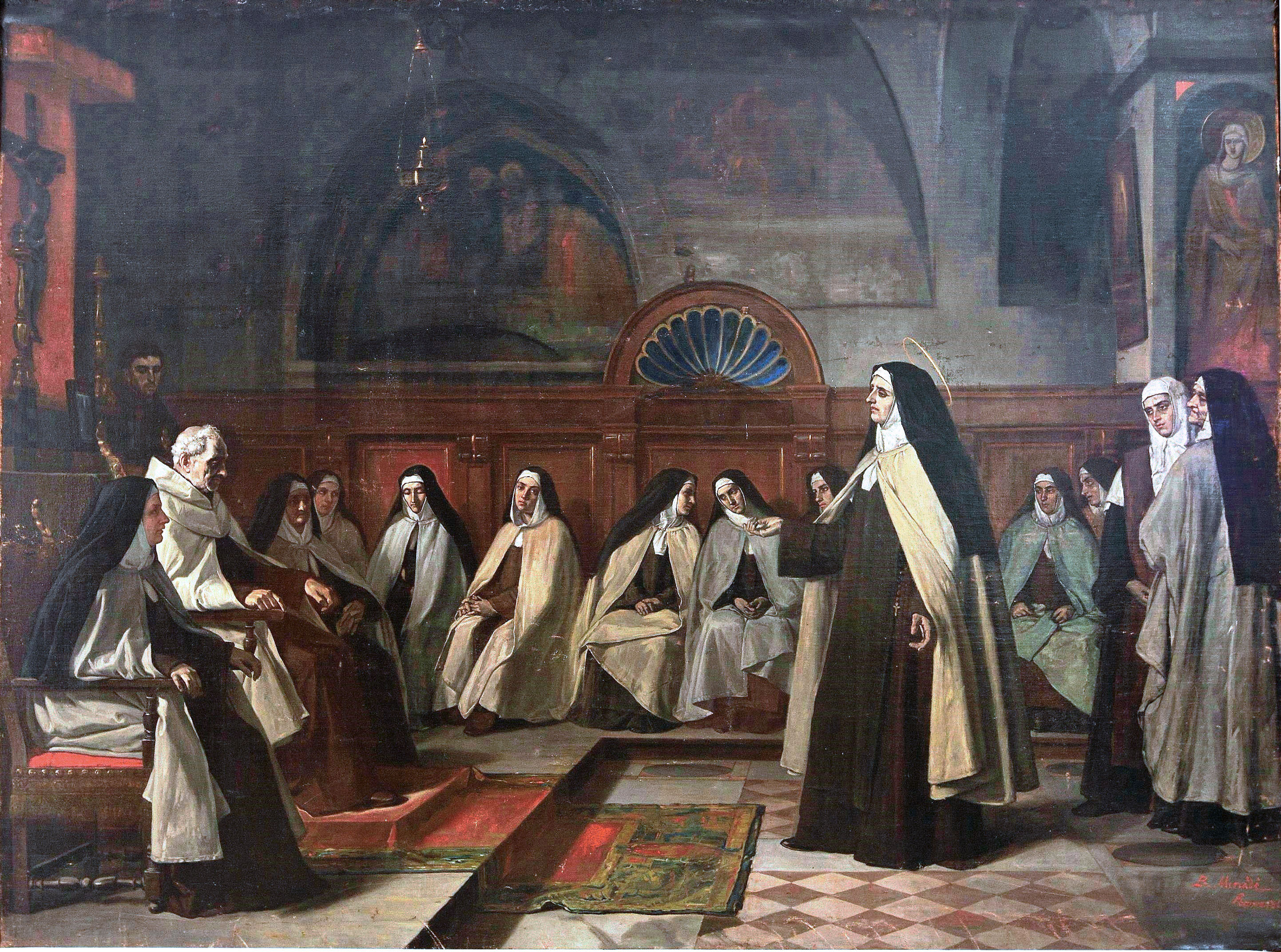
Saint Teresa of Jesus (1868)

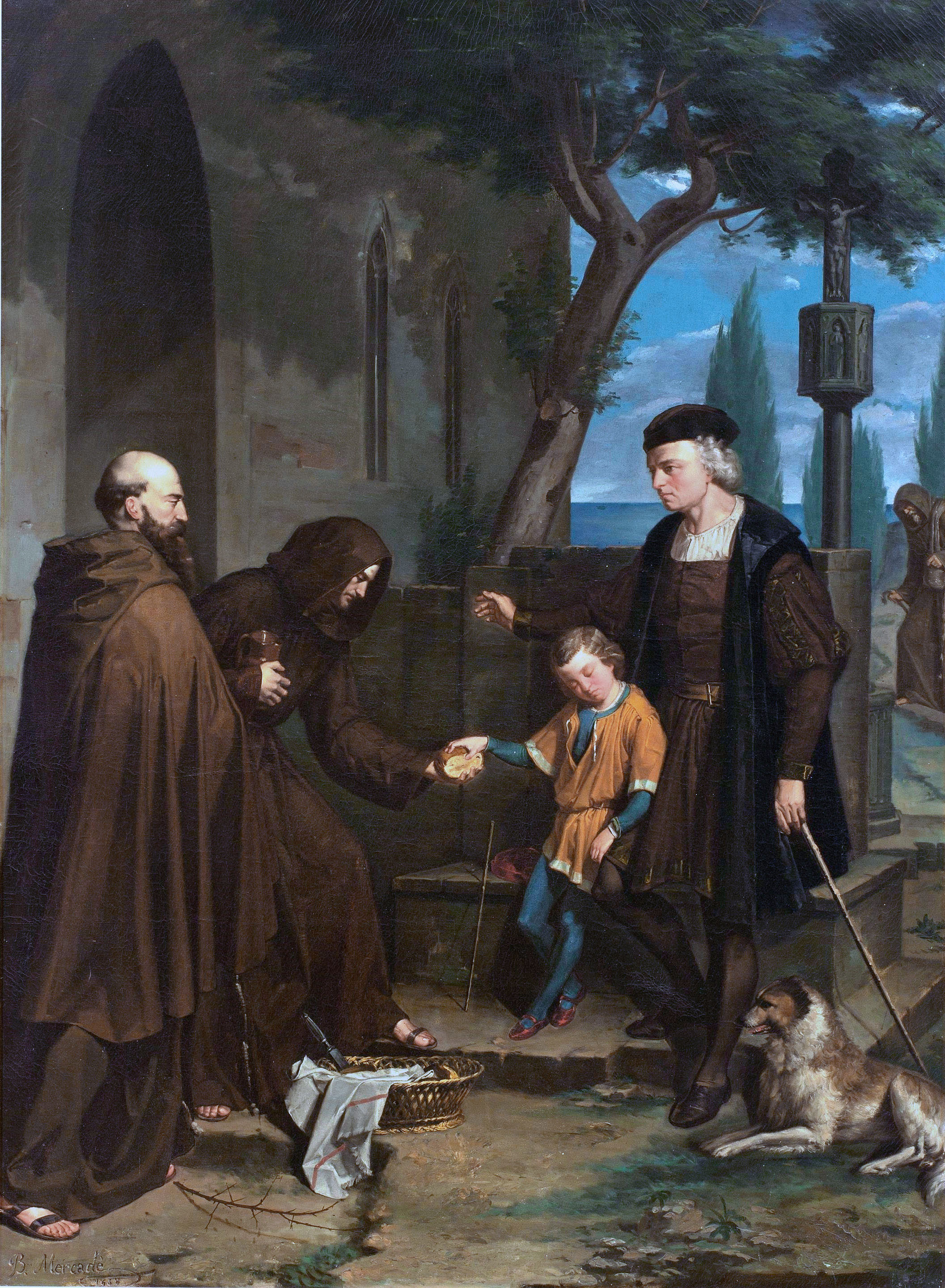
Columbus at La Rábida Friary (1858)

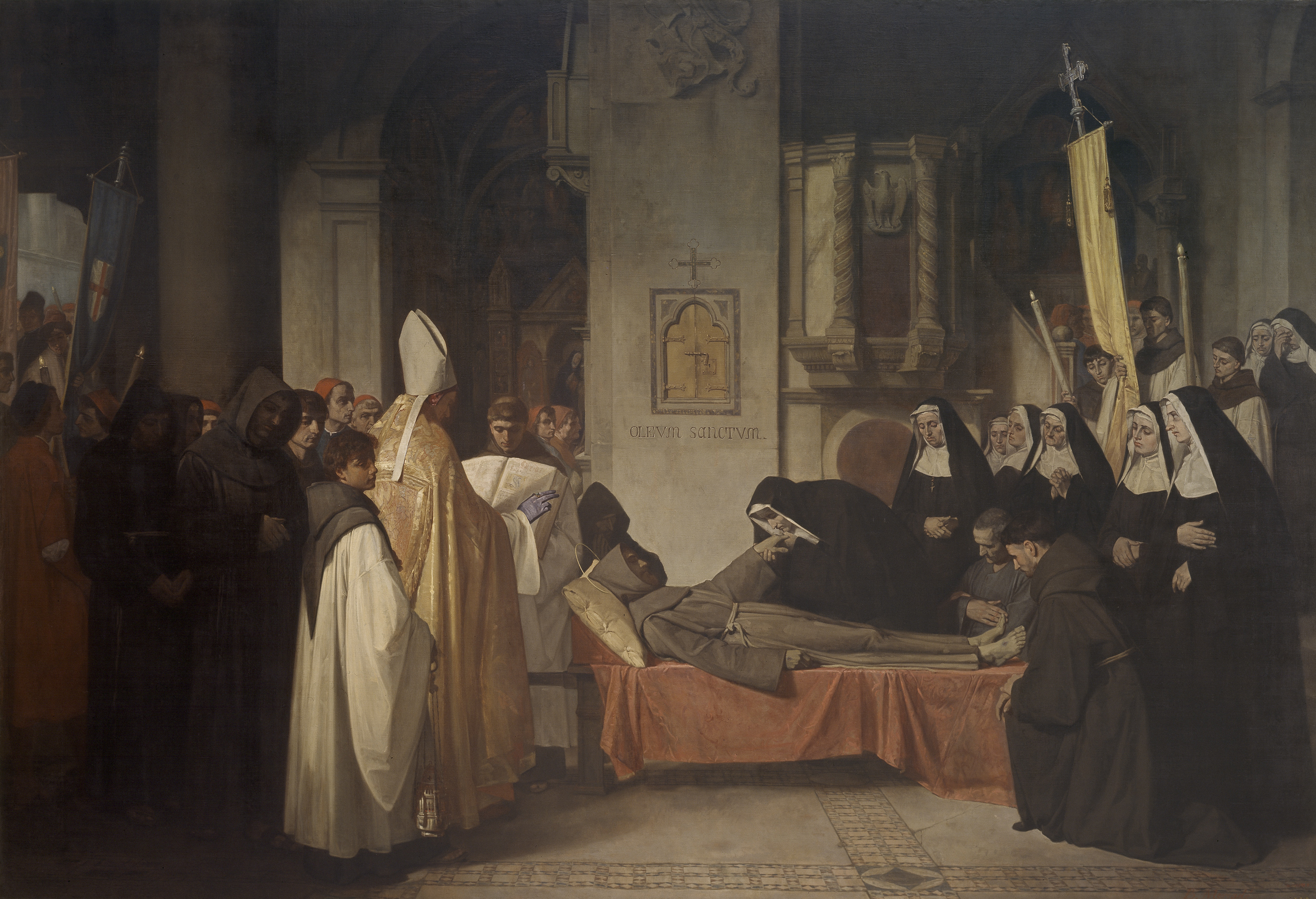
The Passing of Saint Francis of Assisi (1866)

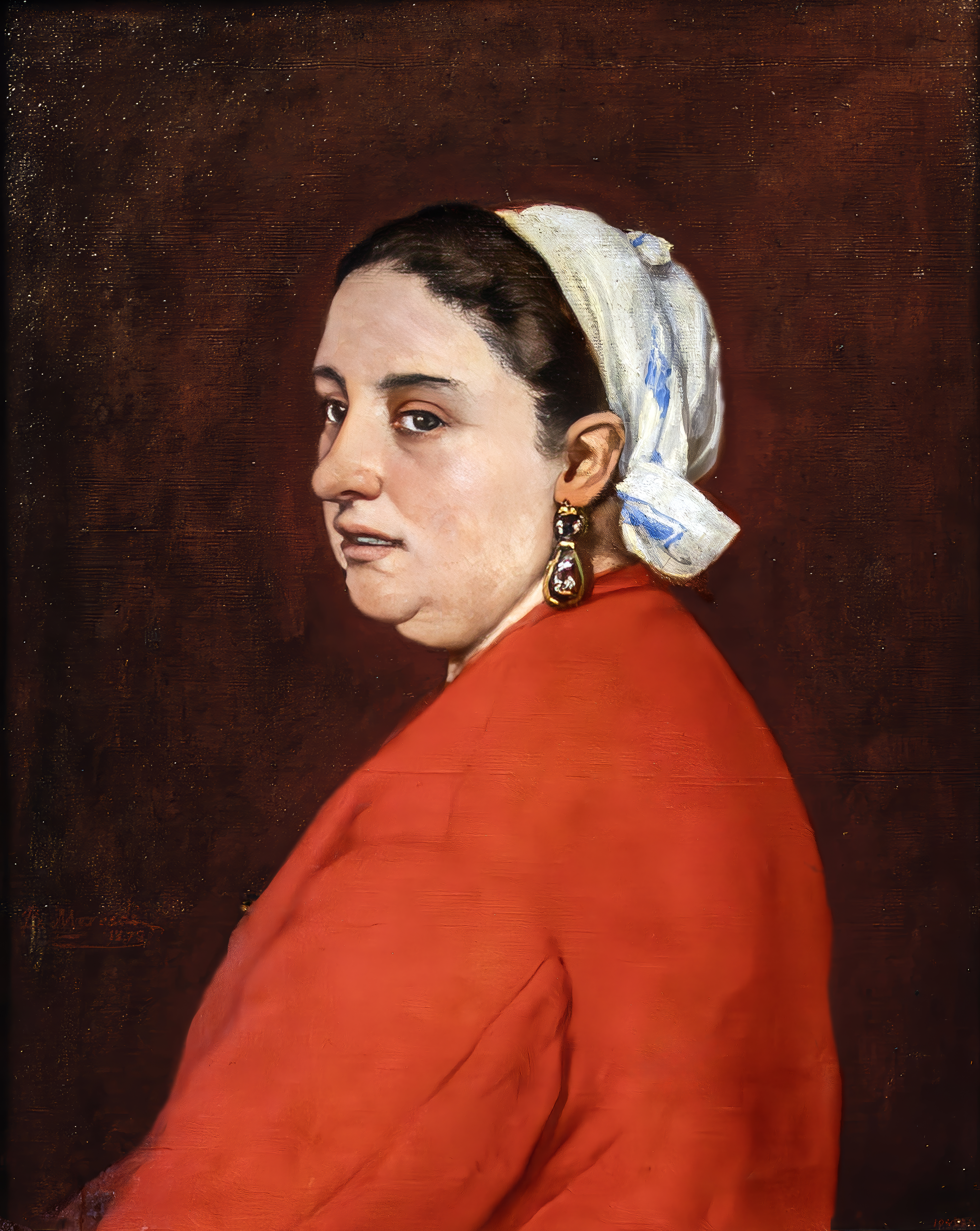
Portrait of Senyora Anita with Red Dress (1872)
