= Himan =

Himan is the name of several towns:

- Heyman, Iran
- Himan-New Cush, South Sudan
