= José Alcázar Tejedor =

Spanish painter (1850–1907)

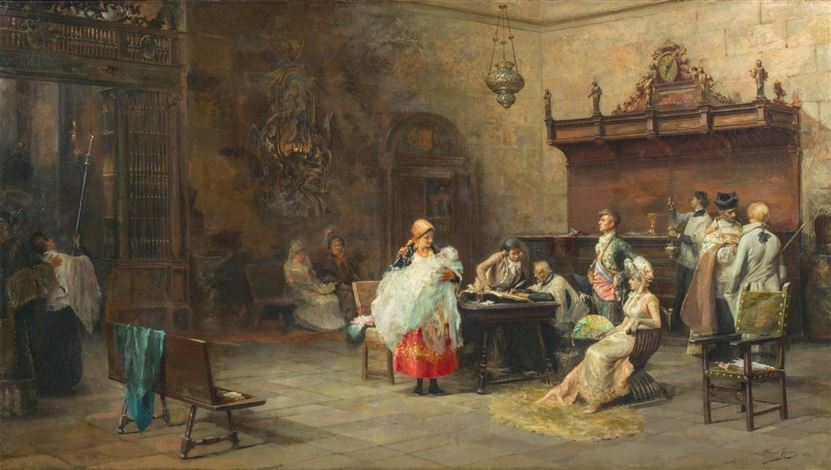
The Baptism

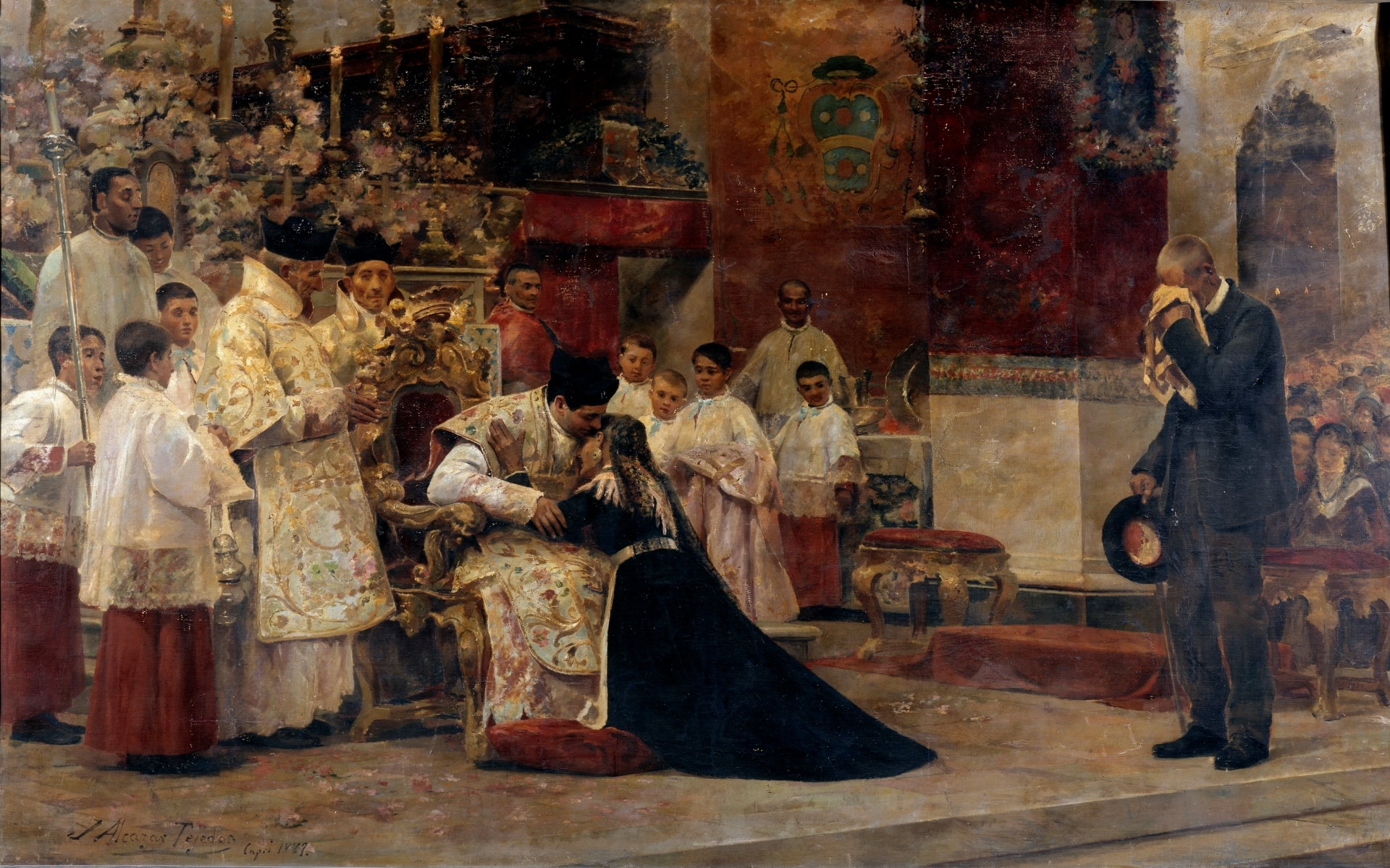
Parents of the Celebrant After His First Mass

José Alcázar Tejedor (1850 in Madrid – 1907 in Madrid) was a Spanish painter of genre scenes; mostly of a religious nature.

== Biography ==
Thanks to a stipend from the Diputación Provincial de Madrid, he was able to study at the Academia de Bellas Artes de San Fernando with Federico de Madrazo, then go to Paris, where he worked with Vicente Palmaroli and had his own studio. His first showing was at the National Exhibition of Fine Arts of 1878, and he was awarded a third-class medal at the exhibition of 1881. Two years later, he received another stipend, at the request of the Academia, to continue his studies in Rome.

A second-class medal at the National Exhibition followed in 1887, for a painting of parents rejoicing at their son's first celebration of Holy Mass. He also obtained a second-class medal at an exposition in Pontevedra. In 1892, the Marquis of Villafuerte commissioned him to create a painting of a choir, which is now at the Cathedral of Segovia.

In 1896, he entered a competition for a chair at the Escuela de Bellas Artes de Barcelona and was appointed a full Professor there in 1902. A major retrospective was held shortly after his death at the Círculo de Bellas Artes.

Among his notable paintings may be mentioned; The Magician, sold at a raffle to benefit the victims of a flood in Murcia, and The Father of the Poor, which was featured at an exhibition of the Círculo. His principal work is now considered to be the one from the exhibition of 1881, which represented a sacristy where a baptism and a funeral service are being held simultaneously.
