= The Parisian Life (painting) =

1892 oil painting by Juan Luna

- Interior d'un Cafi (French)
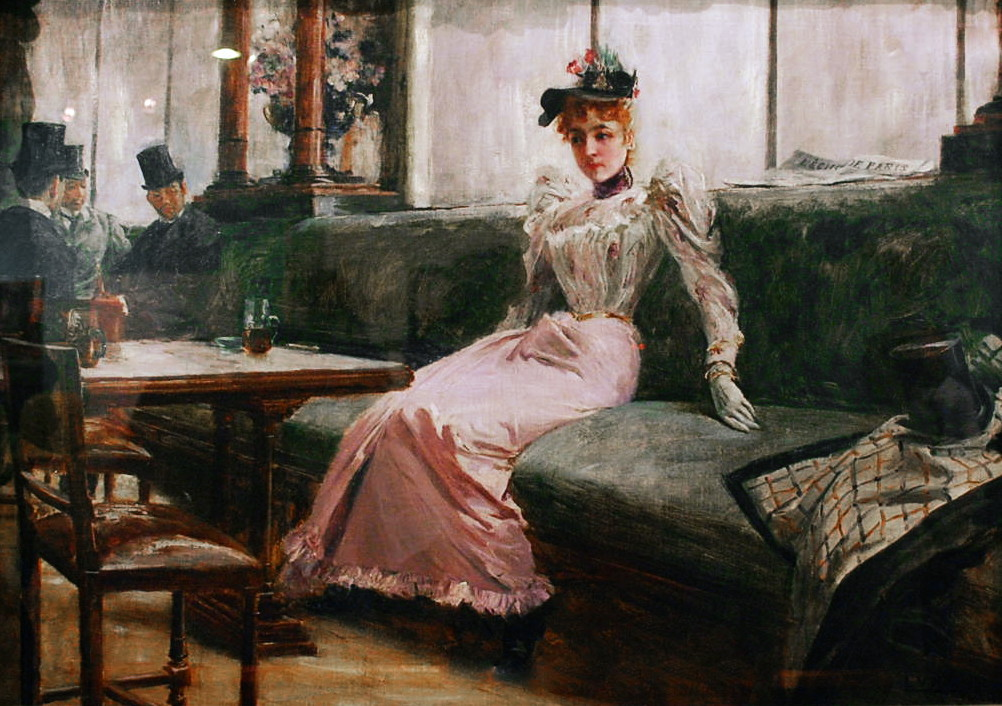
- Artist: Juan Luna
- Year: 1892
- Dimensions: 57 cm × 79 cm (22 in × 31 in)
- Location: National Museum of Fine Arts On loan from the Government Service Insurance System

The Parisian Life, also known as Interior d'un Cafi (also spelled Interior d’Un Café, literally meaning "Inside a Café"), is an oil on canvas impressionist painting made by Filipino painter and revolutionary activist Juan Luna in 1892. The painting presently owned by the Government Service Insurance System is currently exhibited at the National Museum of Fine Arts after the state pension fund transferred management of its collection to the National Museum in March 2012.

Measuring 57 cm × 79 cm (22 in × 31 in), The Parisian Life is one of the masterpieces that Luna created when he stayed in Paris, France from October 1884 to February 1893. His own personal “Parisian life” was a total of eight years. This period in Luna's career in painting is known as the post-academic or the Parisian period, a time when his style moved away from having “dark colors of the academic palette” and became “increasingly lighter in color and mood”. As an artist, Luna became renowned on the European continent and became “a familiar of the French and Spanish royal courts”. During the period, apart from his heightening artistry Luna was also participating in the Philippine propaganda movement together with José Rizal, the national hero of the Philippines. Months after painting The Parisian Life, Luna would be departing from Paris to Madrid, Spain then to Manila, Philippines in 1894 in order to rejoin Rizal and Dr. Ariston Bautista Lin, and perform his role in the Philippine Revolution and war of independence in 1896.

During this time, Luna also had to deal with the death of an infant daughter and the alleged extra-marital affair of his wife Paz Pardo de Tavera with a French physician. Because of jealousy, Luna killed his wife and his mother-in-law. Luna also attempted to kill his brother-in-law. A French court charged Luna for committing a "crime of passion" but was acquitted of parricide and murder on February 7, 1893.

The Parisian Life is regarded as the last major work Luna did during his post-academic and life in Paris because from 1894 Luna travelled frequently that he was only able to paint a few number of landscapes in the Philippines. When Luna returned to France in 1898, he was an appointed member of the delegation in Paris representing the Philippine revolutionary government tasked to work for the diplomatic recognition of the Philippines as an independent Republic. In 1899, Luna died in Hong Kong while on the way back to the Philippines.

== Description ==
Painted a few months prior to September 1892, a time when Luna would be “caught up in dramatic events” that lead to a “heroic path”, The Parisian Life has a “playful” and “relaxed mood” that does not provide “the slightest hint of the tumultuous happenings to come” in Luna's personal life. It portrayed a scene inside a café in Paris with a woman identified as a courtesan or a prostitute representing "fallen womanhood", who was about to rise from a sofa overshadowing three men placed at the far left corner of the painting. Apart from the prominent figure of the female wearing a pale lavender frock and a hat embellished with flowers, fronted by two glasses of beers and an empty beer mug belying a "company of men", The Parisian Life portrayed a glimpse of Luna's own life in the capital of France while accompanied by two close friends.

The painted illustration captured the gathering of three significant personas and heroes in Philippine History having a discussion about the Philippines “on the eve of momentous events” during the springtime in Paris. The three gentlemen dressed in European garb – top hats and coats – at the left of the image are Luna himself, José Rizal, and Ariston Bautista Lin, who were on an “expedition” during a casual evening in a café believed to be named as Maxim’s, brimming with self-confidence while enjoying a moment inside the café. They were described as Filipino gentlemen who “embraced Western lifestyle while remaining (...) Filipino at heart.” In the painting Rizal was with a half-turned back, Luna was at the center seated in a cheerful mood, and Lin was sitting closest to the lady in the portrait and characterized to be the person with the “most vivid expression” among the three gentlemen throwing an inquisitive glance toward the woman. The evident intimate mood of the painting was further enhanced by Luna by placing the details of the deserted hat and cape, the pulled-out chair, and the coat on the sofa. According to Eric Zerrudo, the director of the Museum of the Government Service Insurance System during a lecture at a week-long SM Mall exhibit, the woman in The Parisian Life has a "geographical likeness" to the mirror-image of the archipelago of the Philippines. Furthermore, Zerrudo mentioned that the woman has a dark neck, the woman was placed with her head in a window joint resulting to having the effect of a sort of "antenna jutting out" of the head. The dark neck and the window joint line showed that as if the woman was being strangled, conveying the message that the Philippines was under stress.

As a cultural and historical artwork, The Parisian Life does not solely embody the “intangible ideas of the Filipino national consciousness” but also Luna's talent as an artist. The Parisian Life painting demonstrates that Luna is an “indefatigable painter of women”. It also demonstrates that Luna was an “enthusiastic observer of the fairer sex”, an artist who had a “keen eye” for the “elusive psychology” of women, and a painter with an “obviously sensitive insight into” women's strength, fragility, happiness, and solemnity. The Parisian Life further proved that Luna was sensitive and skillful in capturing a fleeting moment of ordinary life that he could imbue with “personality and universal emotions”.

== Documentation and exhibition ==
The original owner of the painting was Ariston Bautista Lin and his family. Before its modern-day exhibition at Christie's auction house in Hong Kong, The Parisian Life was featured on page 147 of Santiago Albano Pilar's book entitled Juan Luna, The Filipino as Painter published in 1980. Pilar's book was published by the Eugenio Lopez Foundation. Pilar reproduced the copy of the painting from the Luis Araneta collection. After Luna completed The Parisian Life it was exhibited only once for public viewing, an exhibition held in 1904 at the World's Fair’s Saint Louis Exposition in the United States, where it won as a silver medalist. Apart from being accompanied by a Saint Louis Exposition certificate, Christie’s Hong Kong gave it an estimated price tag of HK$1,800,000 - HK$2,000,000, an equivalent of $231,921 - $257,690. Despite this price estimate, the GSIS Museum, a Philippine-government owned and controlled corporation, bought the painting from Christie's Hong Kong in October 2002 for the price of $870,000 (P 45.4 to 46 million). After procuring Luna’s The Parisian Life from Christie’s, the GSIS Museum toured the painting around the Philippines. In January 2004, The Parisian Life’s final destination for the tour was the University of Santo Tomas’s Museum of Arts and Sciences (the oldest museum in the Philippines), where other two Luna paintings are parts of the university’s art collection, namely the Playa de Kamakura (“Kamakura Bay”) and The Italian Soldier.
