= Juan Luna =

Filipino painter and sculptor

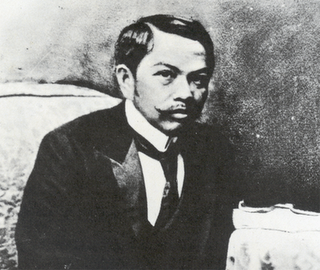
- Juan Luna c. 1899
- Born: Juan Novicio Luna; October 25, 1857 (Note: In October 2023, the National Historical Commission of the Philippines, through Resolution No. 18, corrected Luna's birth date to October 25, 1857, based on his baptismal record in Badoc Church which reportedly stated that Luna was three days old when he was baptized on October 27. It is contrary to October 23 and 24, both as per other sources and had been indicated in historical markers. NHCP cited "fallibility of memory" as Luna claimed in his 1886 marriage certificate that he was born on October 24.); Badoc, Ilocos Norte, Captaincy General of the Philippines, Spanish Empire
- Died: December 7, 1899 (aged 42); British Hong Kong
- Resting place: San Agustin Church, Intramuros, Manila, Philippines
- Known for: Painting, drawing, sculpting
- Notable work: Spoliarium, 1884; The Death of Cleopatra, 1881; El pacto de sangre, 1884; Hymen, oh Hyménée!, 1887; La batalla de Lepanto, 1887; The Parisian Life, 1892; The River, 1885; in museums: Museo del Prado; National Museum of Fine Arts; Ayala Museum; Lopez Museum; Malacañan Palace
- Movement: Academic Art; Romanticism, Neoclassicism, Realism
- Spouse: Paz Pardo de Tavera (m. 1886–1892)
- Family: Antonio Luna (brother); Joaquin Luna (brother); Andrés Luna de San Pedro (son)

Juan Luna de San Pedro y Novicio (Spanish: [ˈxwan ˈluna], Tagalog: [hwɐn ˈluna]; October 25, 1857 – December 7, 1899) was a Filipino painter, sculptor and a political activist of the Philippine Revolution during the late 19th century. He became one of the first recognized Philippine artists.

His winning of the gold medal in the 1884 Madrid Exposition of Fine Arts, along with the silver win of fellow Filipino painter Félix Resurrección Hidalgo, prompted a celebration which was a significant highlight in the memoirs of members of the Propaganda Movement, with the fellow Ilustrados toasting the two painters' good health and the brotherhood between Spain and the Philippines.

Well regarded for work done in the manner of European academies of his time, Luna painted literary and historical scenes, some with an underscore of political commentary. His allegorical works were inspired by classical balance, and often showed figures in theatrical poses.

== Biography ==
=== Early life ===
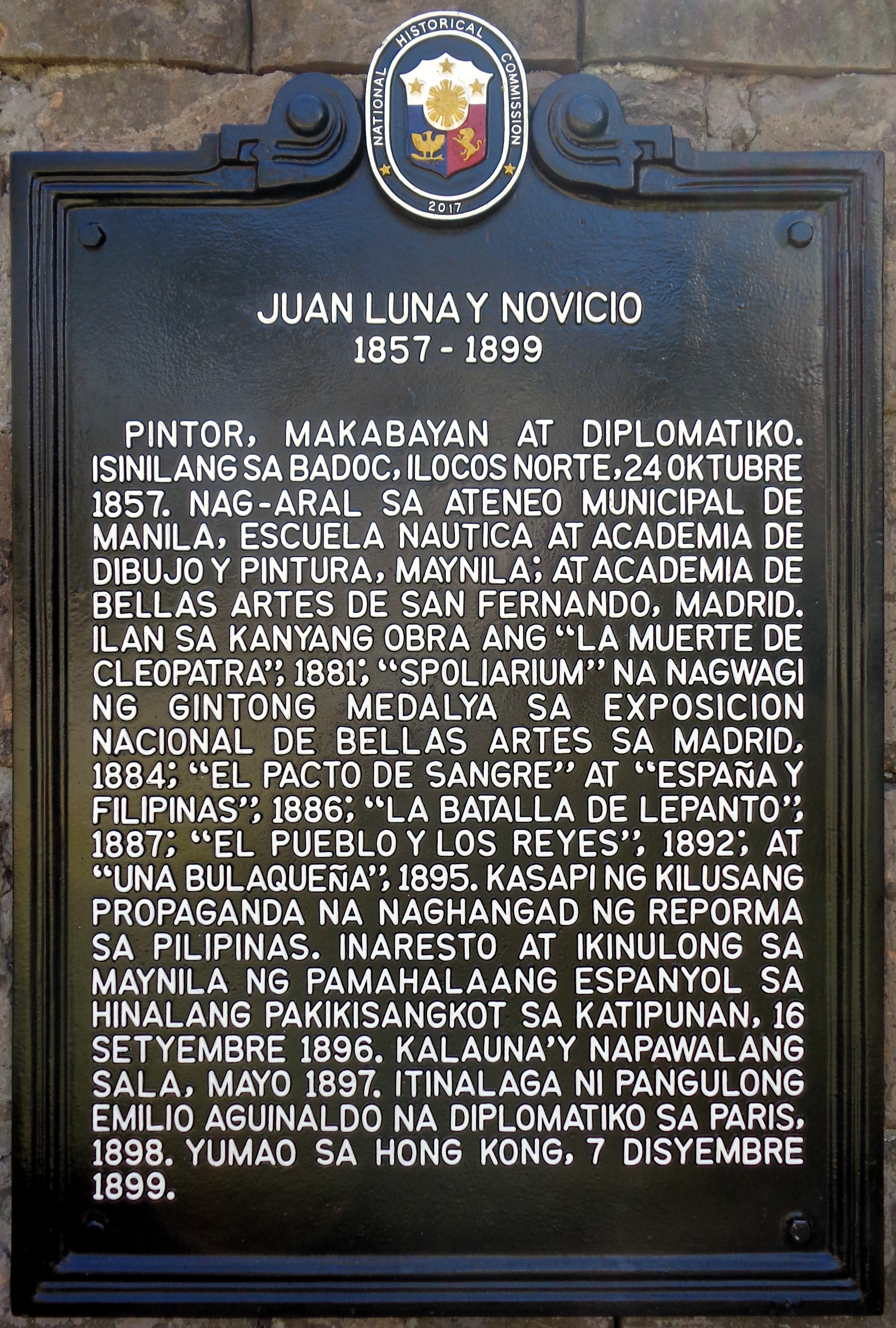
National historical marker unveiled in 2017 at the Juan Luna Shrine in Badoc

Born in the town of Badoc, Ilocos Norte in the northern Philippines, Luna was the third among the seven children of Joaquín Luna de San Pedro y Posadas and Laureana Novicio y Ancheta. In 1861, the Luna family moved to Manila, and he went to the Ateneo Municipal de Manila where he obtained his Bachelor of Arts degree. He excelled in painting and drawing and was influenced by his brother, Manuel N. Luna, who, according to Filipino patriot José Rizal, was a better painter than Juan himself.

Luna enrolled at the Escuela Nautica de Manila (now Philippine Merchant Marine Academy) and became a sailor. He took drawing lessons under the illustrious painting teacher Lorenzo Guerrero of Ermita, Manila. He also enrolled in the Academy of Fine Arts (Academia de Dibujo y Pintura) in Manila where he was influenced and taught how to draw by the Spanish artist Agustin Saez. Unfortunately, Luna's vigorous brush strokes displeased his teacher and Luna was discharged from the academy. However, Guerrero was impressed by his skill and urged Luna to travel to Madrid to further pursue his work.

=== Travel abroad ===
In 1875 Manuel and Juan Luna travelled to Europe, where Manuel studied music and Juan painting. Juan entered the Escuela de Bellas Artes de San Fernando, where he befriended the painter Don Alejo Vera. Luna was unhappy with the style of teaching in the school and decided that it would be much better to work with Vera.

Vera brought him to Rome for some of his commissions, and Luna was exposed to the art of the Renaissance painters. It was in 1878 that his artistic talents were established with the opening of the first art exposition in Madrid, which was called the Exposición Nacional de Bellas Artes (National Demonstration of Fine Arts). From then on, Luna became engrossed in painting and produced a collection of paintings that he exhibited at the 1881 Exposition.

In 1881, his La Muerte de Cleopatra won him a silver medal and came in second place. Luna's growing reputation as an artist led to a pensionado (pension) scholarship at 600 pesos annually through the Ayuntamiento of Manila. The condition was that he was obliged to develop a painting which captured the essence of Philippine history, which would then become the Ayuntamiento's property.

=== Artistic career ===
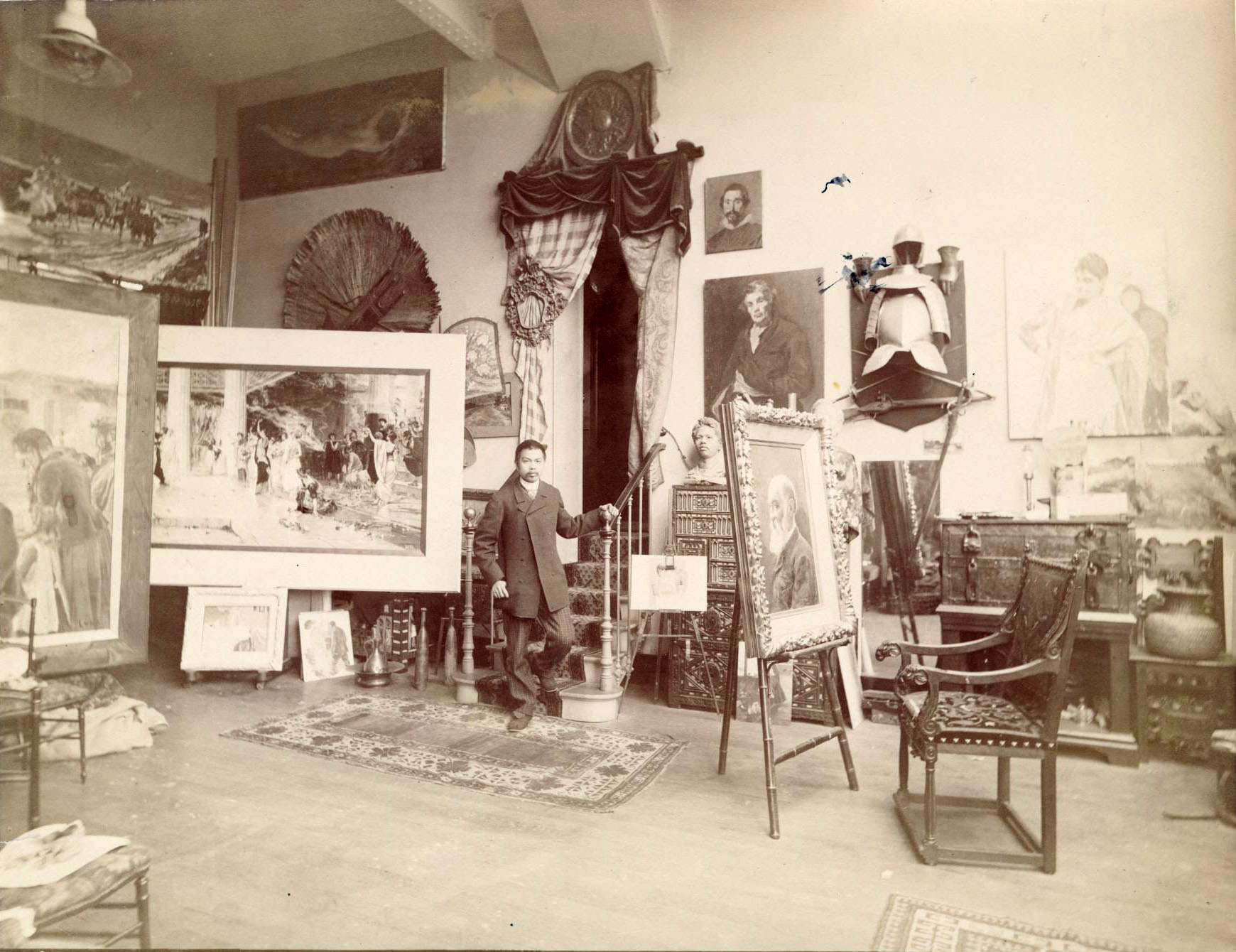
Juan Luna in his Paris studio

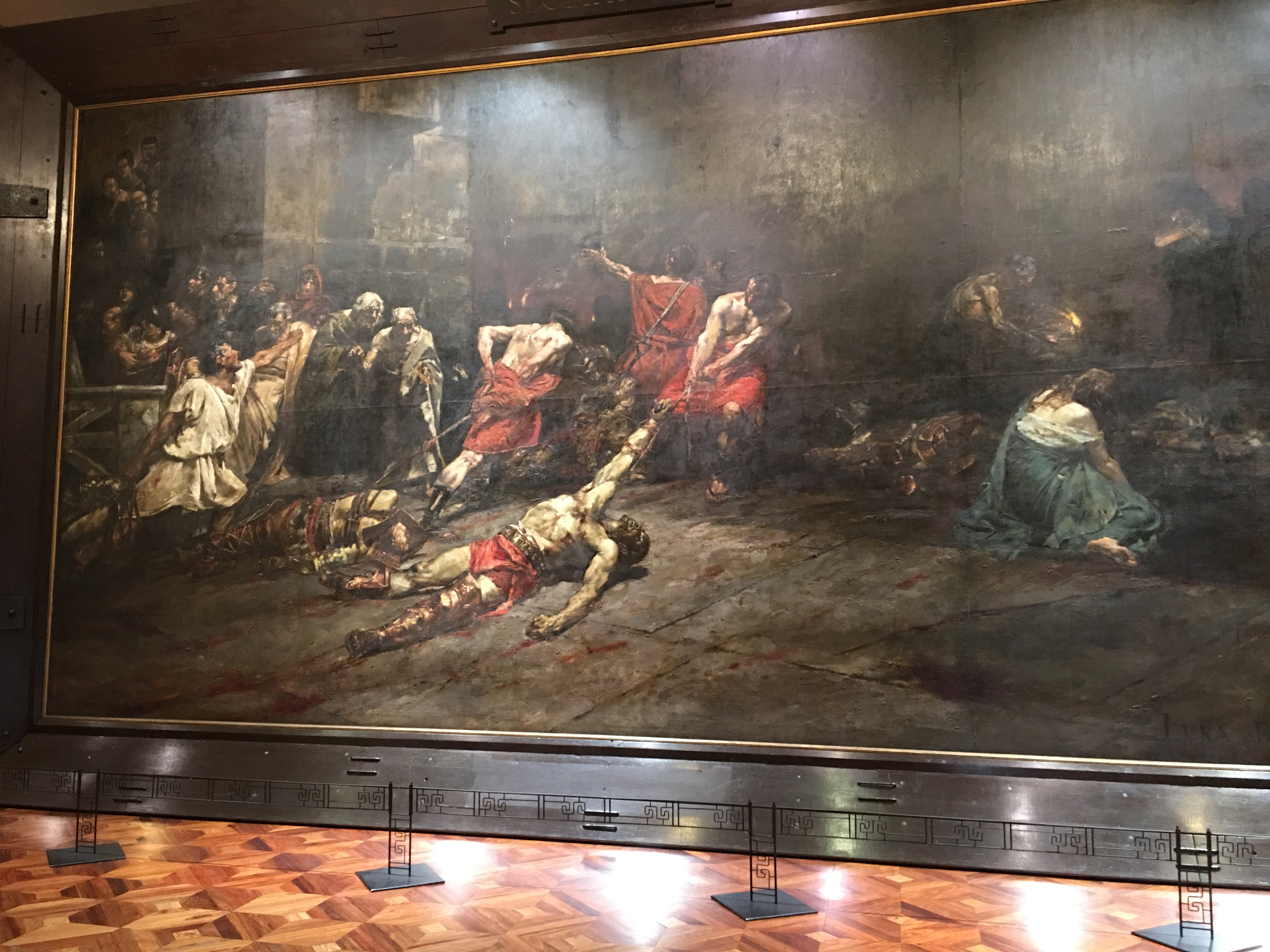
Spoliarium of Juan Luna displayed at Philippine National Museum of Fine Arts

In 1883, Luna commenced work on the painting commissioned by the Ayuntamiento. By May 1884, he dispatched the expansive canvas portraying the Spoliarium to Madrid for the annual Exposición Nacional de Bellas Artes. Remarkably, he became the inaugural recipient of one of three gold medals bestowed at the exhibition, earning recognition from both connoisseurs and art critics in attendance. On June 25, 1884, a gathering of Filipino and Spanish nobles organized an event to celebrate Luna's triumph in the exhibition. During the event, Rizal prepared a speech lauding his friend, highlighting the two significant aspects of his artwork—the exaltation of genius and the magnificence of his artistic prowess.

Despite Luna's recognition and acclaim for his artistic achievements, he was unjustly denied the esteemed Medal of Honor due to racial prejudice against him as a colonial subject. Nevertheless, King Alfonso XII commissioned Luna to create La batalla de Lepanto (The Battle of Lepanto) for the halls of the Senate of Spain, intending for it to be displayed alongside Francisco Pradilla Ortiz's La rendicion de Granada (The Surrender of Granada), the grand prize-winning artwork from the 1878 competition. The king's intention was to provide compensation to Luna, who had been overlooked for the Medal of Honor with his renowned work, Spoliarium.

Luna's signed and dated 1884 oil canvas portrait of Adele della Rocca, niece of Count Enrico Morozzo Della Rocca, First aide-de-Camp, Honorary General Adjutant to King Umberto, was sold for P31 million at the Leon Gallery auction on September 14, 2024.

In 1885, Luna relocated to Paris, where he established his own studio and formed a friendship with Hidalgo. Honouring an agreement with the Manila City Council, he completed the artwork titled El pacto de sangre (The Blood Compact) a year later. This painting portrayed the 1565 Sandugo (blood compact ritual) between Datu Sikatuna, a prominent ruler from Bohol Island, and the Spanish governor-general Miguel López de Legazpi, surrounded by other conquistadors. The piece now graces the walls of the Malacañan Palace. This painting and a full-sized portrait of López de Legazpi were completed and returned to Manila in exchange for his scholarship.

At first, Luna was praised for his grandiose historical works of art in the Graeco-Roman fashion at prestigious European art salons that conformed to classical requirements. However, he became disenchanted with his representations of historical scenes, which he expressed in his writings to his fellow Philippine patriots and like-minded Spanish politicians. Contrary to the presumption of abandonment of academic tradition or a newly found appreciation for impressionism, Luna joined forces with the progressive factions within the Paris Salon.

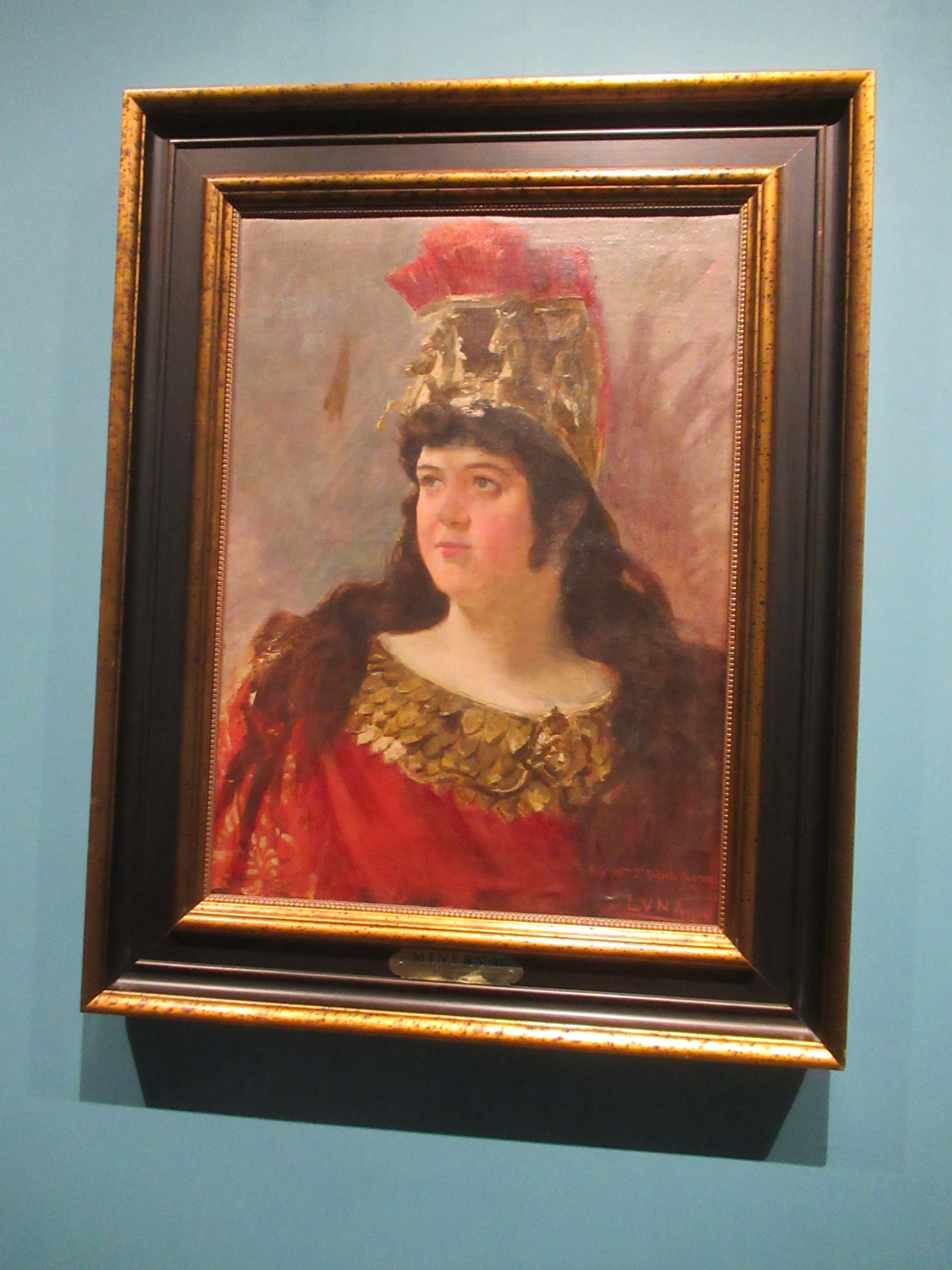
Minerva ( Museo de Intramuros)

By 1891, Luna shifted his focus towards creating realist artworks that portrayed the societal ills of his time. Influenced by his readings of economists Karl Marx and Émile Louis Victor de Laveleye, his works began to reflect these influences. In a letter addressed to Rizal, Luna openly embraced his personal affiliation with socialism. An excellent example of Luna's shift in artistic style can be seen in his work titled "Les Ignores". Painted between 1890 and 1891, the work portrays a winter funeral procession for an ordinary labourer, evident from the modest wooden coffin and the attire of the mourners, reflecting their humble status.

Luna's commitment to realist art persisted in his other notable works, such as The Parisian Life and series on the French Revolution, Peuple et Rois (People and Kings).

=== Marriage ===
On December 4, 1886, Luna married María de la Paz Pardo de Tavera, a sister of his friends Félix and Trinidad Pardo de Tavera. The couple traveled to Venice and Rome and settled in Paris. They had one son, whom they named Andrés, and a daughter, María de la Paz, nicknamed Bibi, who died when she was three years old. Luna frequently accused Paz of having an affair with Monsieur Dussaq. This culminated on September 22, 1892, when he shot the door his wife was behind, killing his wife and mother-in-law, as well as wounding his brother-in-law, Trinidad. He was arrested and murder charges were filed against him.

Luna was acquitted of the charges on February 8, 1893, on the grounds that it had been a crime of passion. Temporary insanity; the "unwritten law" at the time forgave men for killing unfaithful wives. He was ordered to pay the Pardo de Taveras a sum of 1,651 francs and eighty three cents, and an additional 25 francs for postage, in addition to the one franc of claims for damages ("dommages-intérêts"). Five days later, Luna went to Madrid with his brother, Antonio Luna, and his son, Andrés.

=== Final years ===
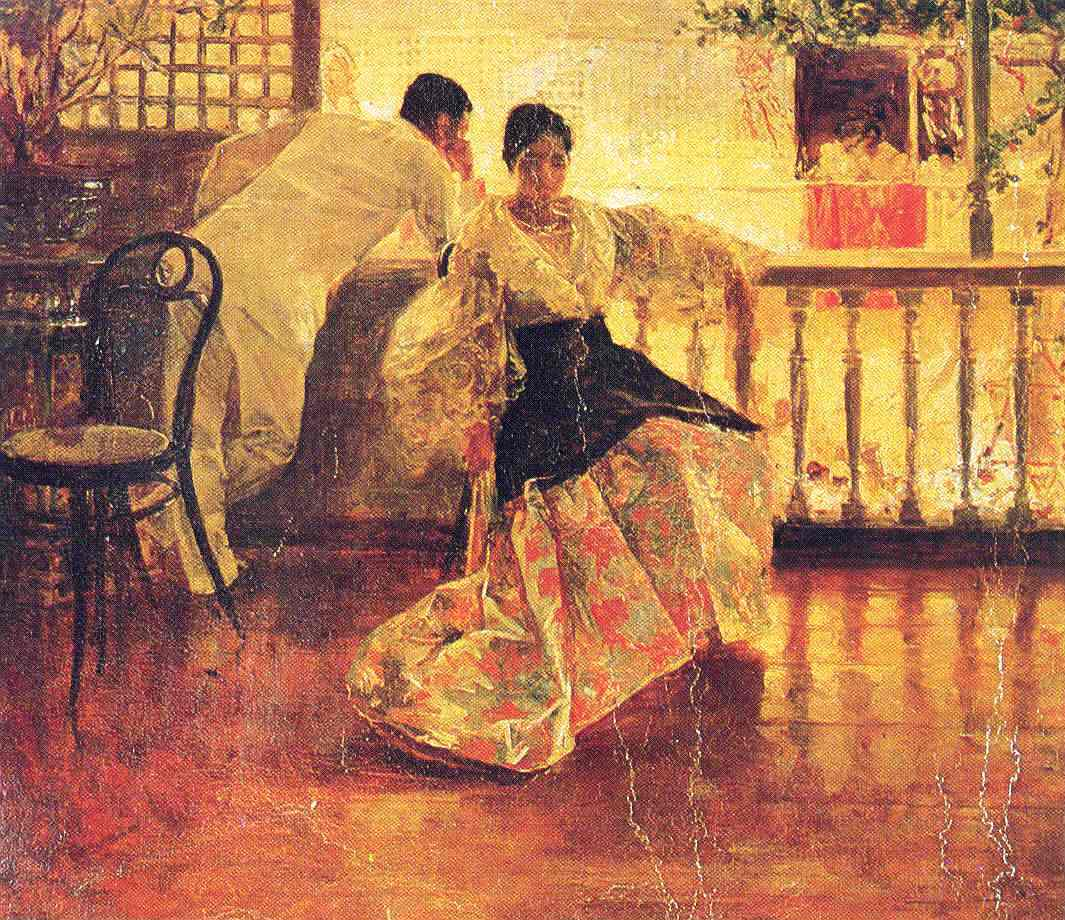
Tampuhan by Juan Luna

In 1894 Luna moved back to the Philippines and traveled to Japan in 1896, returning during the Philippine Revolution of the Cry of Balintawak. On September 16, 1896, he and his brother Antonio Luna were arrested by Spanish authorities for being involved with the Katipunan rebel army. Despite his imprisonment, Luna was still able to produce a work of art which he gave to a visiting priest. He was pardoned by the Spanish courts on May 27, 1897, and was released from prison and he traveled back to Spain in July. He returned to Manila in November 1898. In 1898, he was appointed by the executive board of the Philippine revolutionary government as a member of the Paris delegation which was working for the diplomatic recognition of the República Filipina (Philippine Republic). In 1899, upon the signing of the Treaty of Paris (1898), Luna was named a member of the delegation to Washington, D.C. to press for the recognition of the Philippine government.

He traveled back to the Philippines in December 1899 upon hearing of the murder of his brother Antonio by the Kawit Battalion in Cabanatuan.

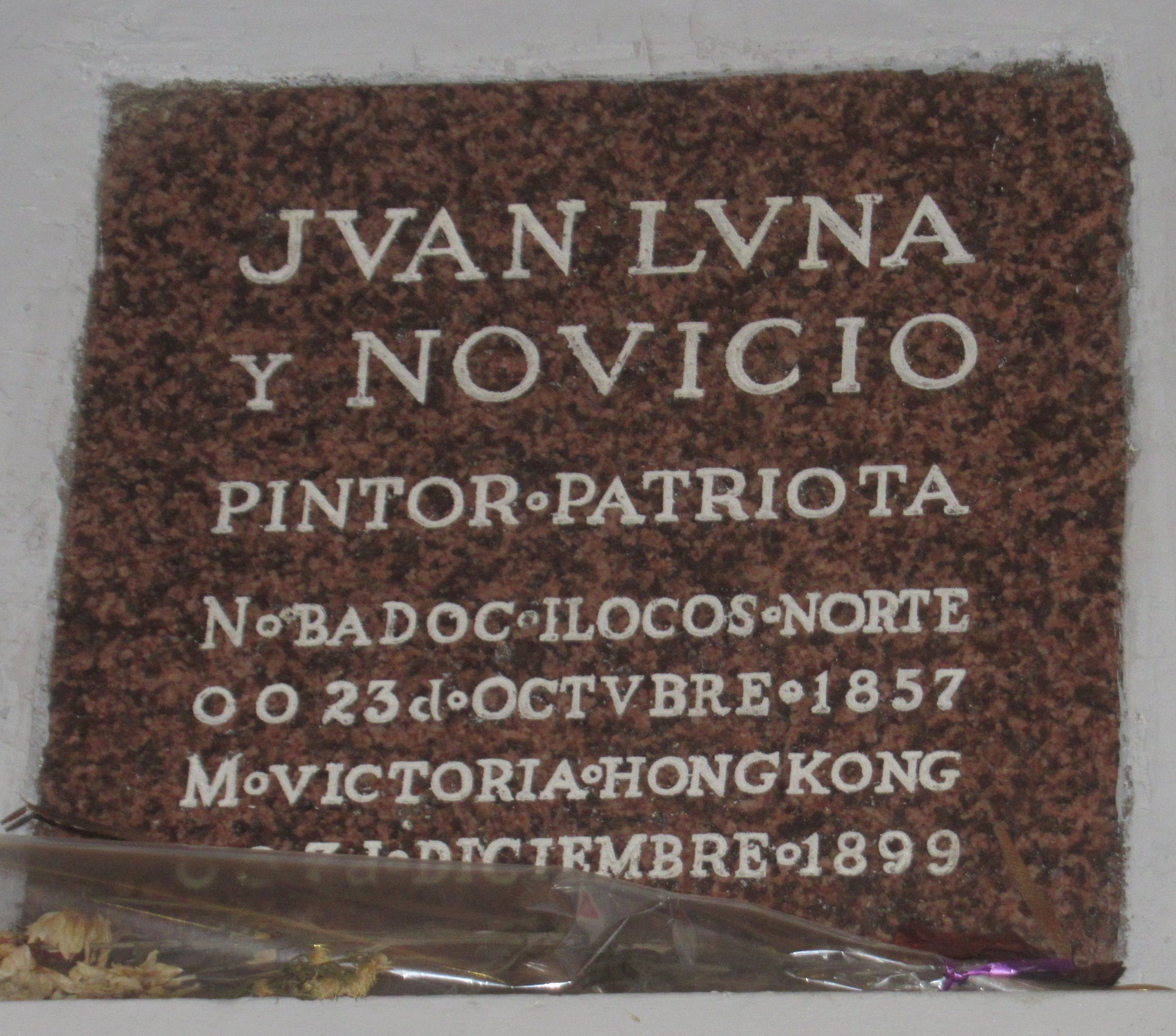
Luna's niche at the Crypt of San Agustin Church (Manila).

=== Death ===
He traveled to Hong Kong and died there on December 7, 1899, from cardiac arrest. His remains were buried in Hong Kong and in 1920 were exhumed and kept in Andrés Luna's house, to be later transferred to a niche at the Crypt of San Agustin Church in the Philippines. Five years later, Juan would be reinstated as a world-renowned artist and Peuple et Rois, his last major work, was acclaimed as the best entry to the Saint Louis World's Fair in St. Louis, Missouri. Some of his paintings were destroyed by fire in World War II.

== Media portrayal ==
- Portrayed by Allan Paule in the 1996 TV series Bayani and the 2015 film Heneral Luna.
- Portrayed by Bryan Benedict in the 2014 TV series Ilustrado.

== Gallery ==
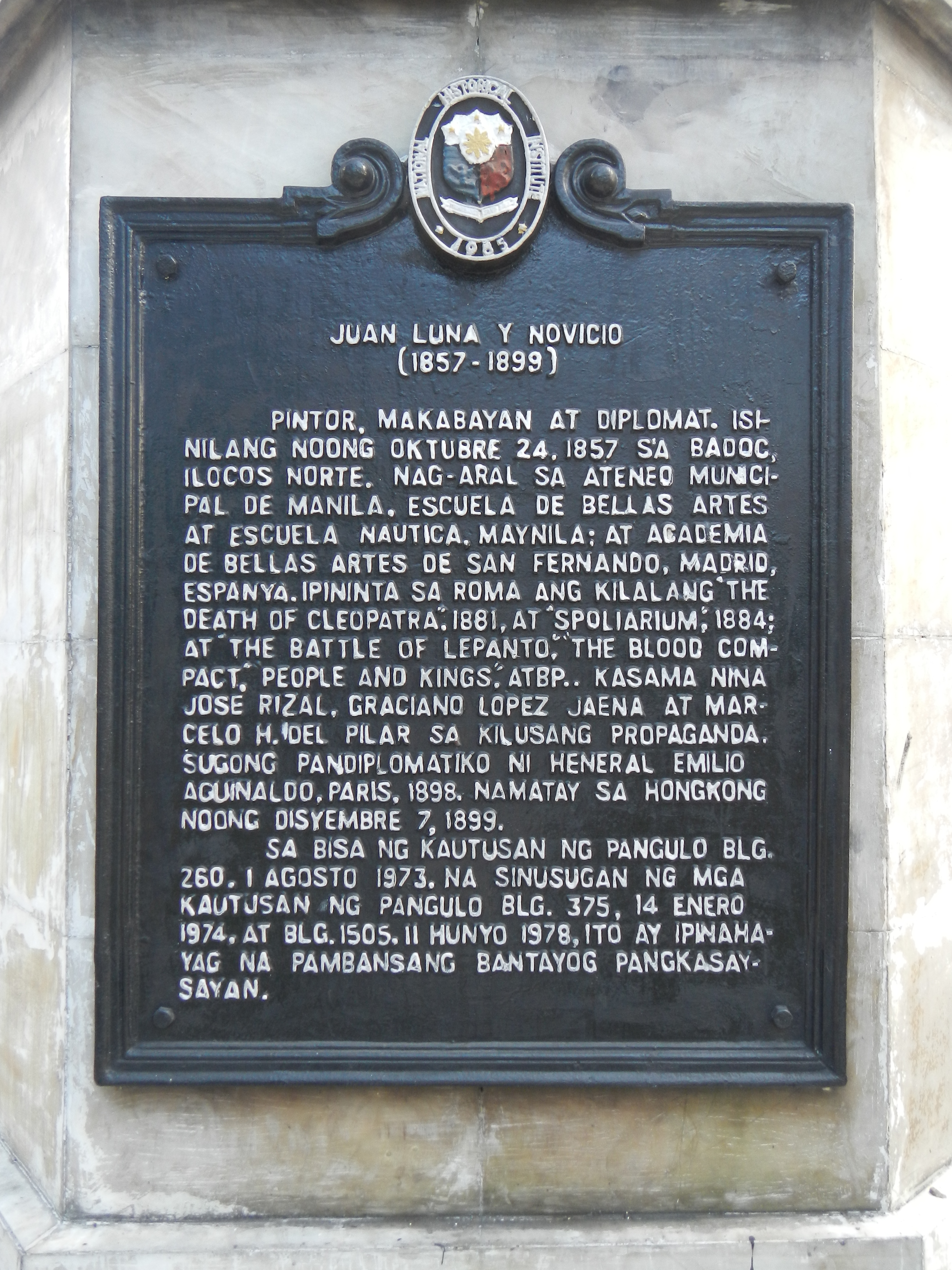
Juan Luna historical marker in Intramuros

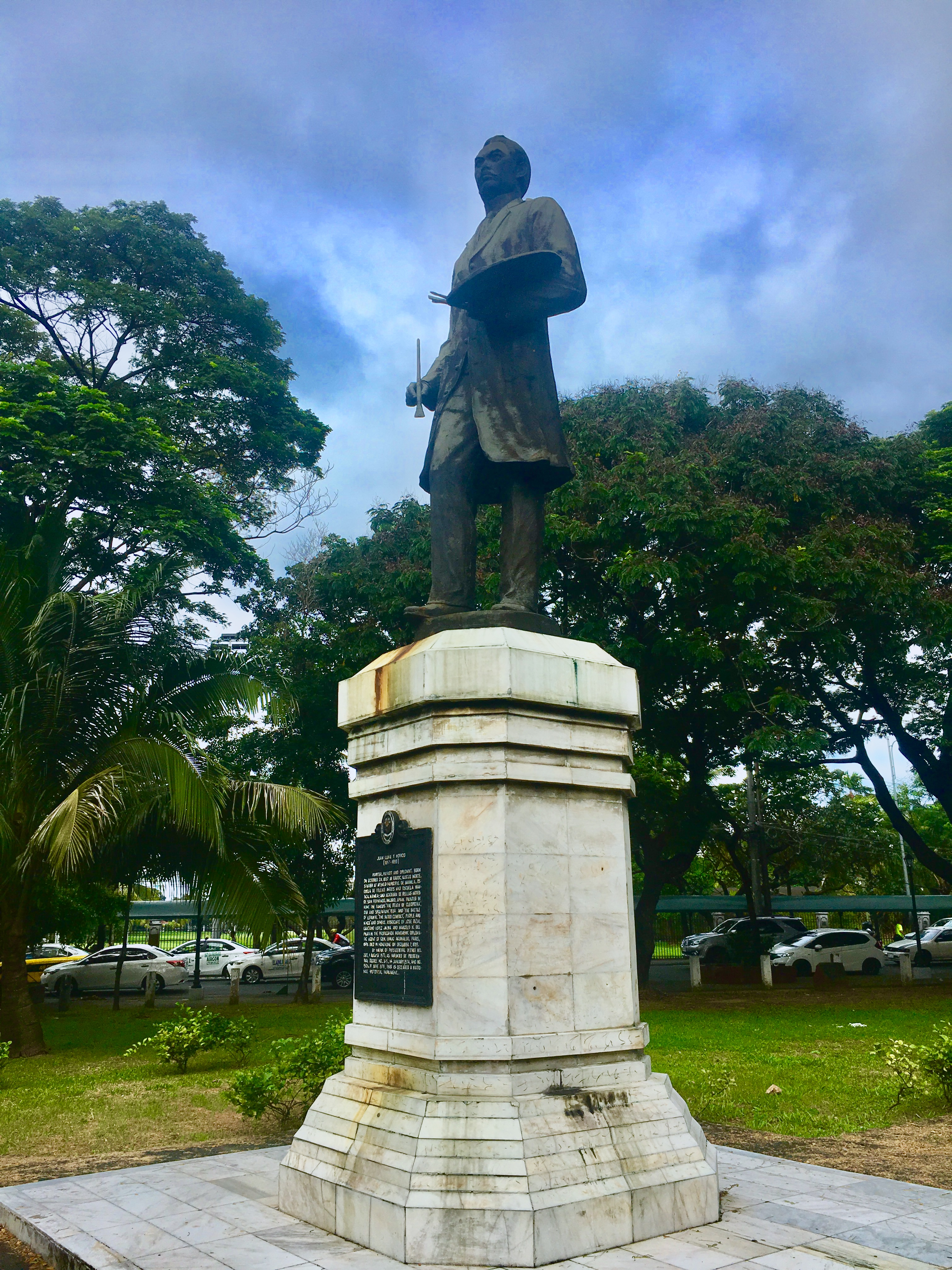
Juan Luna Monument near Intramuros

== See also ==
- Spoliarium
- The Blood Compact
- España y Filipinas
- Antonio Luna
- José Rizal
- José Honorato Lozano
- Damián Domingo
- Fernando Amorsolo
- Fabián de la Rosa
- Justiniano Asuncion
- Félix Resurrección Hidalgo
- Emilio Aguinaldo
- Isabelo Tampinco
- Bonifacio Arévalo
