= Gaetano Palmaroli =

Italian painter

Gaetano or Cayetano Palmaroli (1801 – December 1, 1853) was an Italian painter, but mostly remembered as a lithographer.

He was born in Fermo, but studied painting in Rome under Tommaso Minardi, and there gained the patronage of the Spanish ambassador who recruited him to paint for the Spanish monarchy. There he made lithographic prints of the works collected in the Prado Museum and Palace of El Escorial. He was knighted into the order of Order of Isabella the Catholic. He left Spain in 1841, with the exile of the Queen Mother, Maria Cristina de Borbon, and returned to Fermo. In 1848, he left Fermo due to the local revolts, and he ultimately died in Madrid, Spain. He was the father of Vicente Palmaroli, who became a prominent genre painter in Spain and became director of the Prado Museum.
