= Luis Álvarez Catalá =

Spanish painter

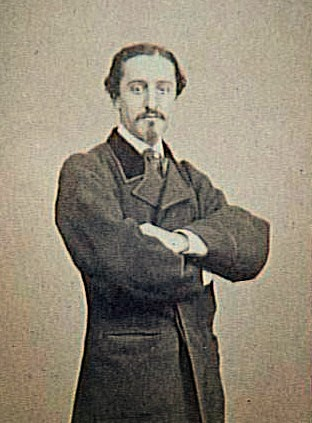
Luis Álvarez Catalá (date unknown)

Luis Álvarez Catalá (22 January 1836 – 4 October 1901) was a Spanish painter of historical scenes and Director of the Museo del Prado from 1898 to 1901.

== Biography ==
He is believed to have been born in Madrid, to an Asturian family from Cangas de Narcea, where he spent the summer seasons during his childhood. After finishing his primary education in Oviedo, he returned to Madrid, where he enrolled in the "Escuela Especial de Pintura, Escultura y Grabado" and was a student of Federico de Madrazo at the Real Academia de Bellas Artes de San Fernando. In 1857, he won a scholarship to study in Rome, together with Eduardo Rosales, Vicente Palmaroli and Dióscoro Puebla. After four years there, he won a gold medal at the first National Exposition of Florence for his painting Calpurnia's Dream, which took second place at the National Exhibition of Fine Arts of Spain in 1862. Queen Isabel II bought the painting and his scholarship was extended for three years.

He was married in Rome, and ultimately remained there until 1894, with brief stays in Madrid. He continued to exhibit widely in Italy, Spain and Germany, winning awards in 1889 and 1890. Finally, he returned to Spain to accept the position of deputy director at the Museo del Prado and, four years later, was appointed Director by the Queen, following the resignation of Francisco Pradilla. His new Deputy was Salvador Viniegra.

During his administration, he made several important acquisitions, including several works by Francisco de Goya. In 1899, he produced a Catálogo ilustrado de la sala de Velázquez (Illustrated catalog of the Velázquez collection) and oversaw the installation of a statue of Velázquez by Aniceto Marinas. He also continued to paint, mainly producing works in the costumbrista style. In his last years, he created scenes inspired by his youth in Northern Spain, many of which are now at the Museum of Fine Arts of Asturias. He died in Madrid.

== Selected works ==
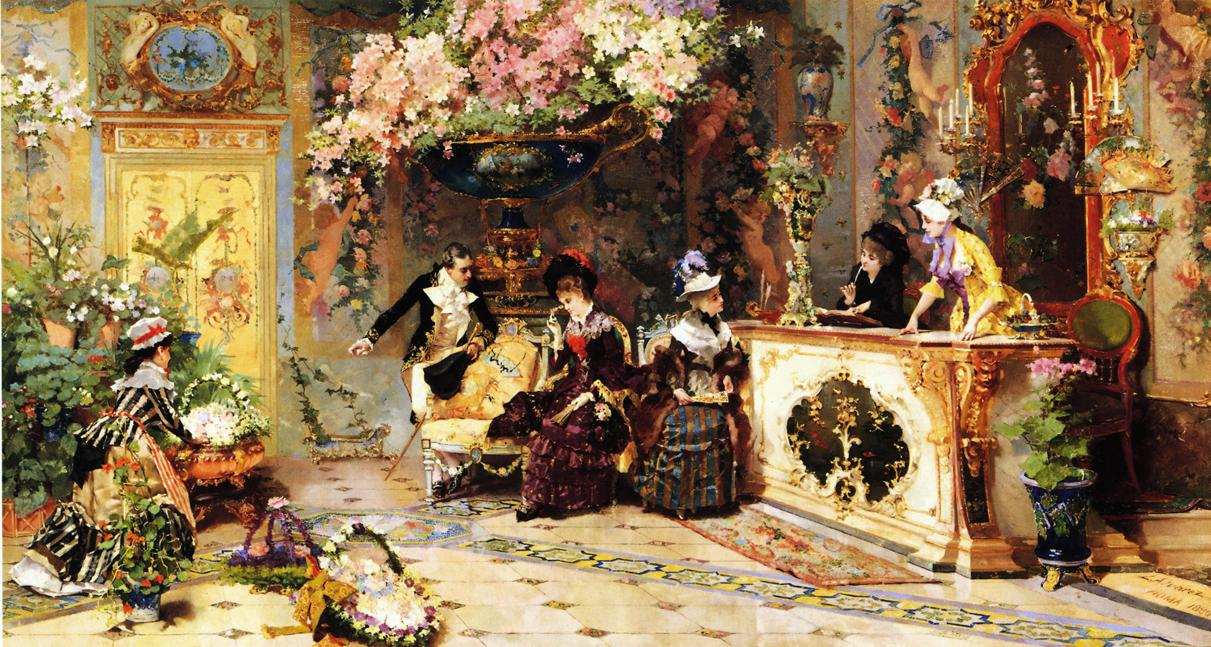
The Flower Shop

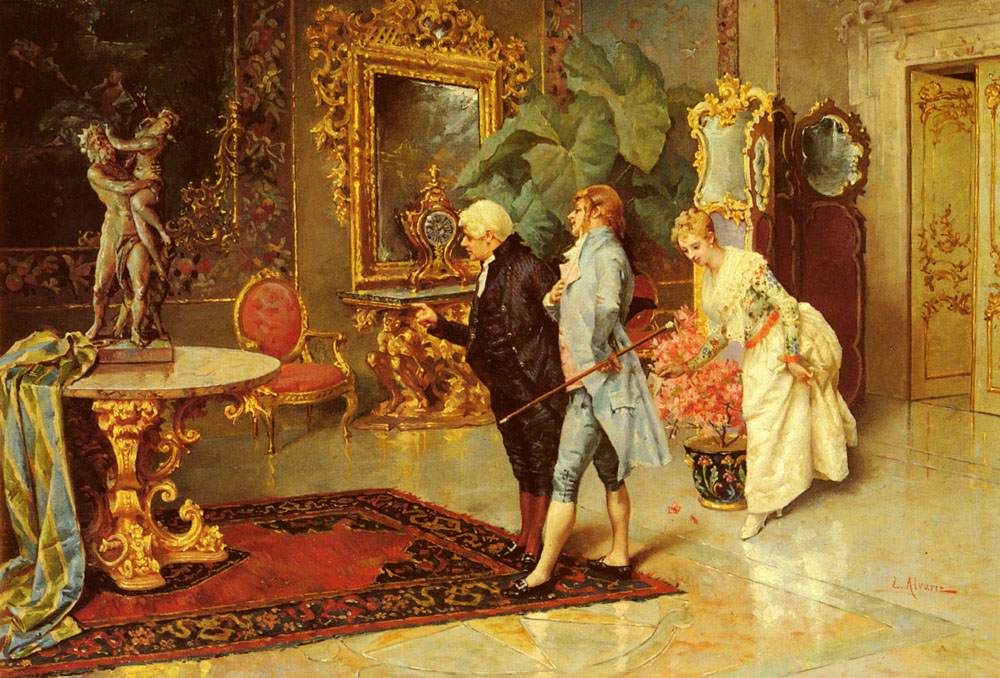
The Unveiling

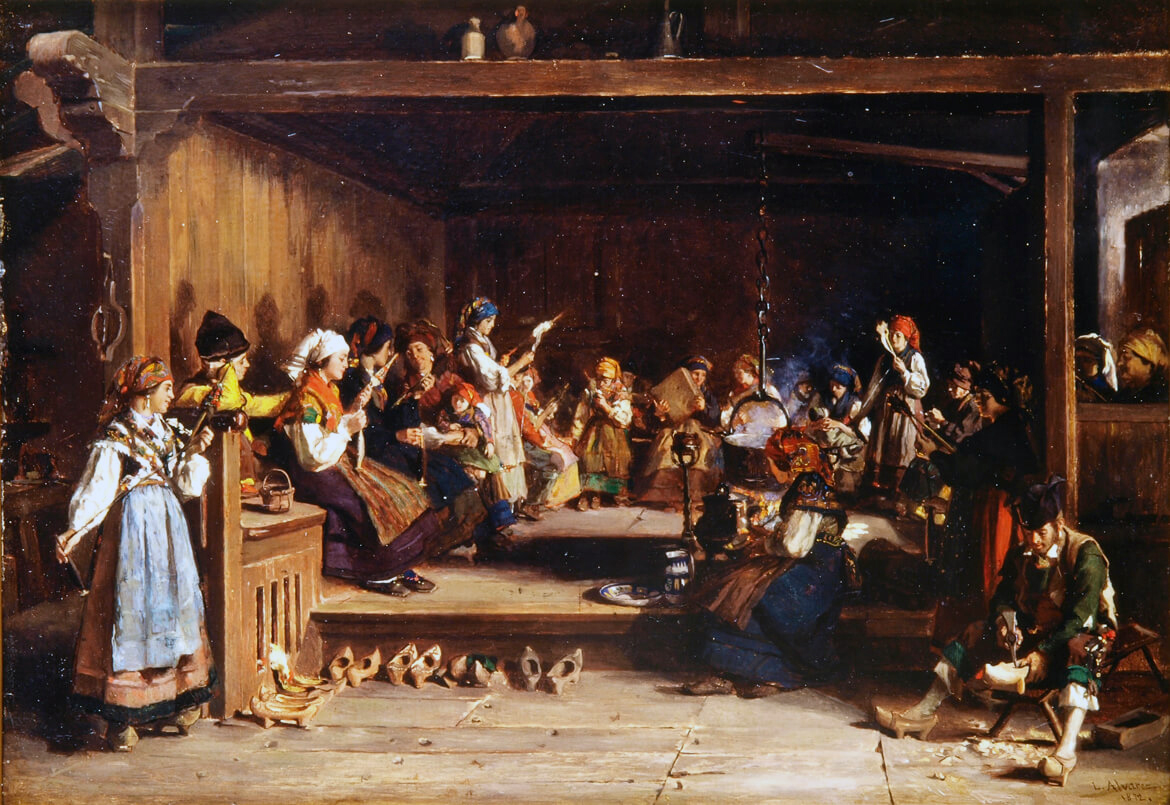
The Filandón, a traditional evening community gathering
in León and Asturias

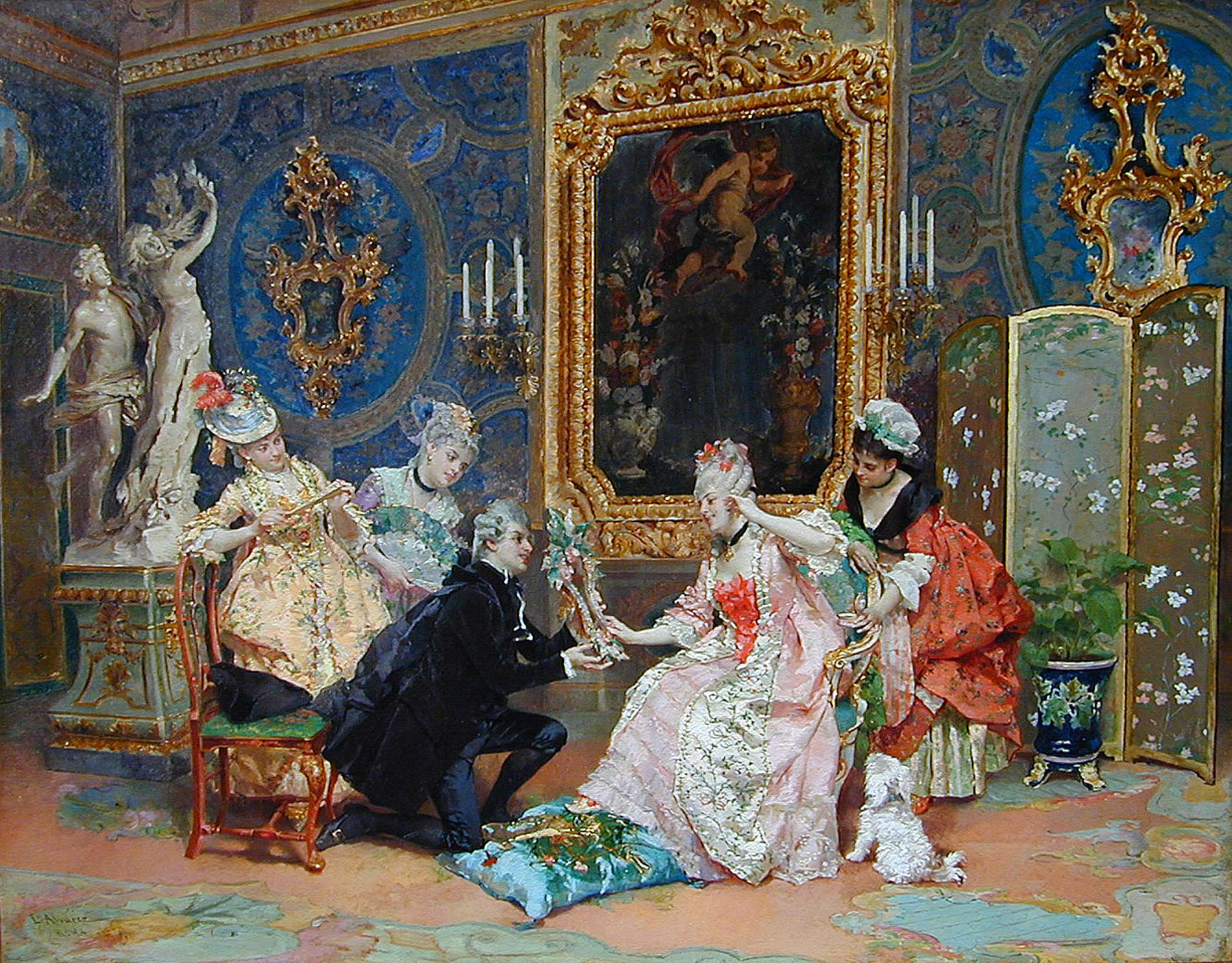
Dressing for the Ball

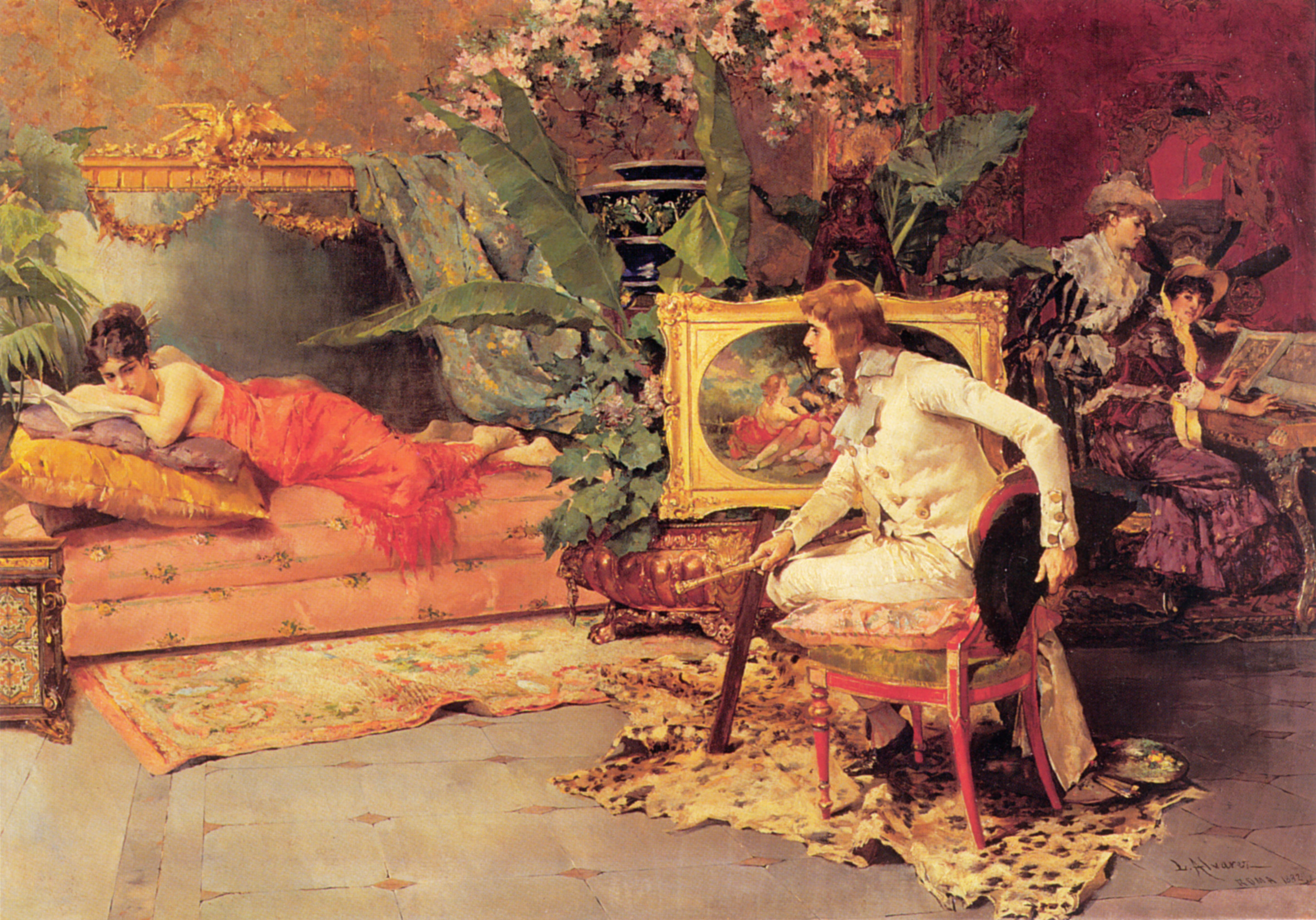
The Artist's Model

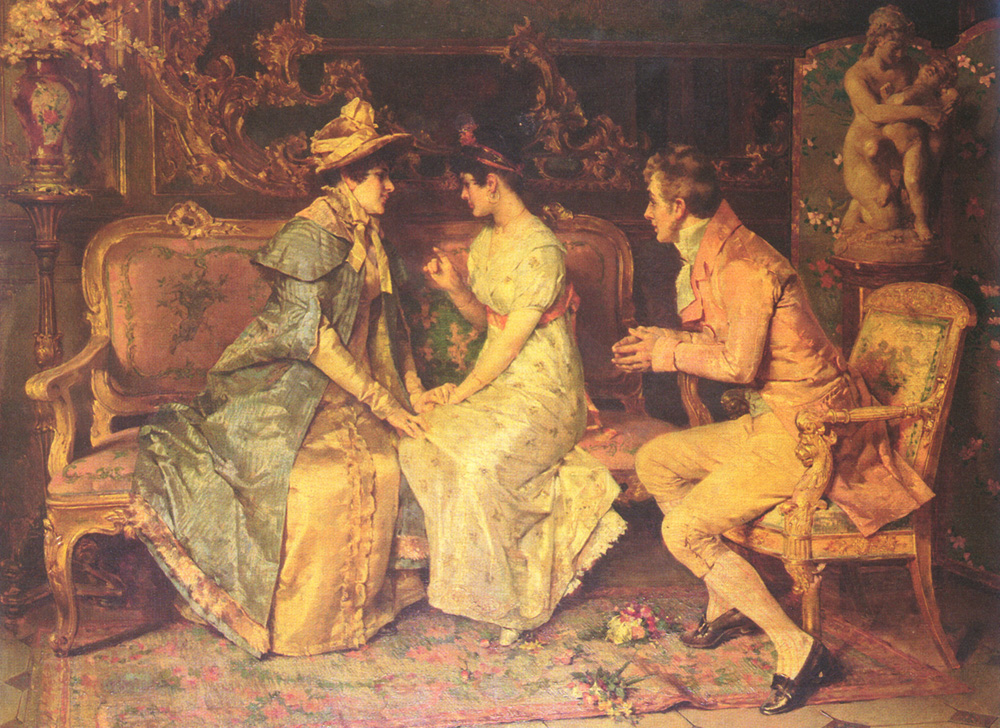
The Suitor
