= Vicente Palmaroli =

Spanish painter (1834–1896)

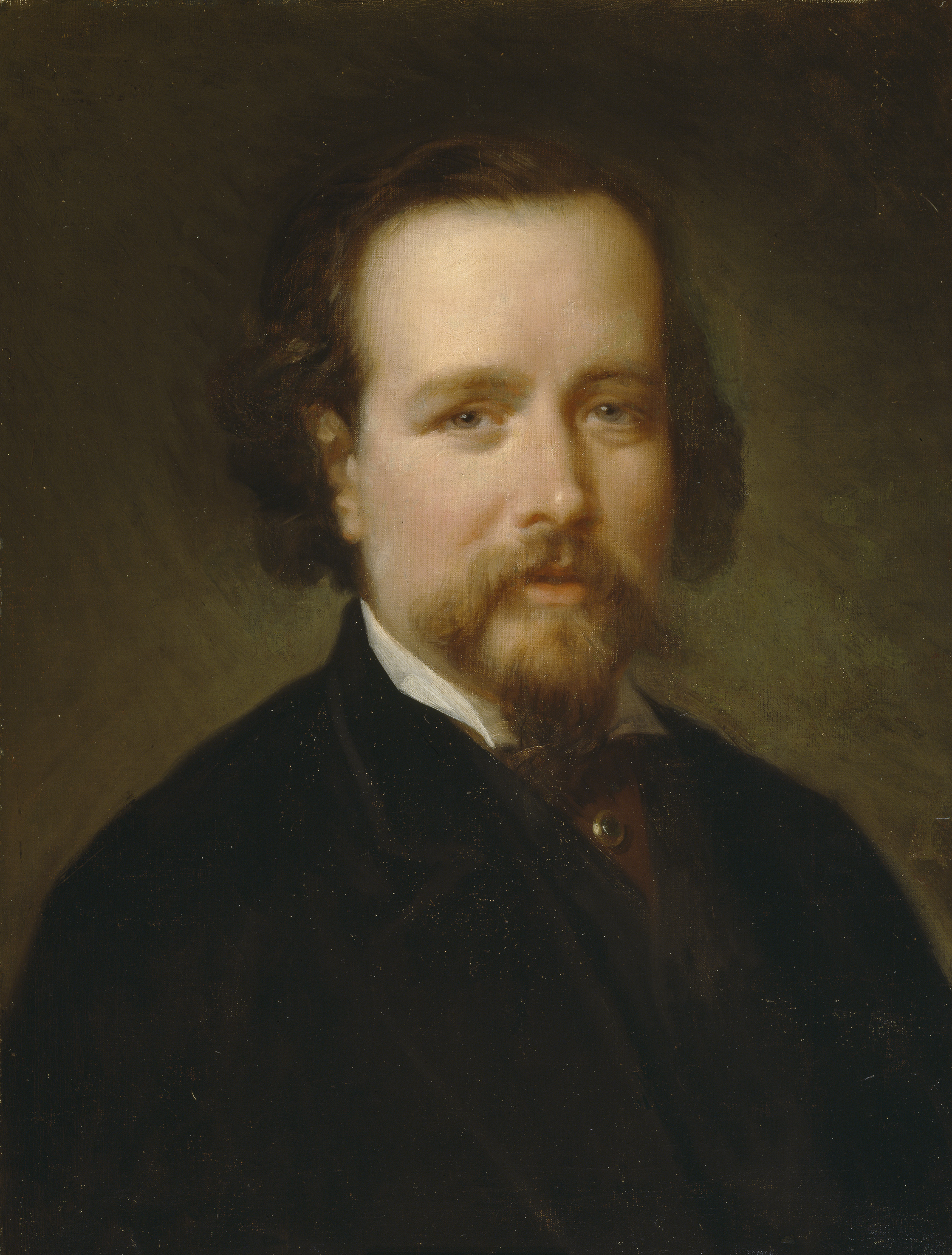
- Vicente Palmaroli, by Luis de Madrazo, 1866-1867
- Born: 5 September 1834; Zarzalejo, Spain
- Died: 25 January 1896 (aged 61); Madrid, Spain
- Education: Rome
- Known for: Painter
- Movement: Orientalist

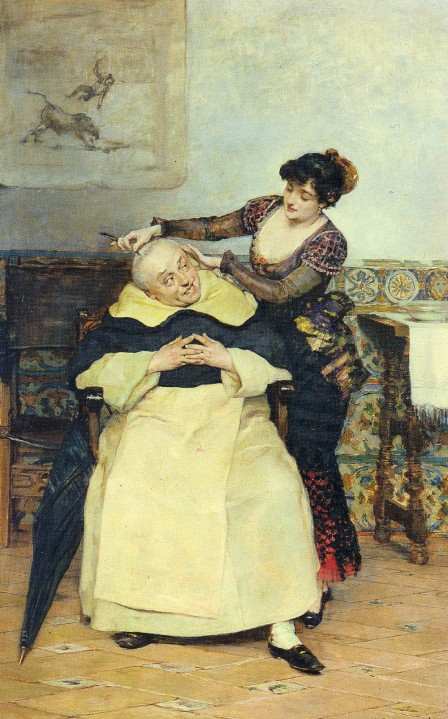
The Haircut (date unknown)

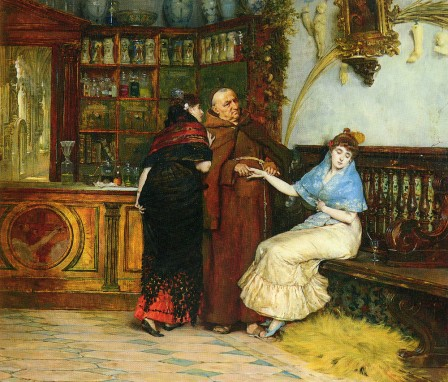
Lovesick (date unknown)

Vicente Palmaroli González (5 September 1834 – 25 January 1896) was a Spanish portrait and genre painter.

== Biography ==
He was born in Zarzalejo, the son of Gaetano Palmaroli, an Italian painter and lithographer, who was his first teacher. After his father's death in 1853, he took over his official position at the royal art collections. He requested leave in 1857 to go to Rome and complete his education, using some surplus money from the collection fund. While there, he joined a group of Spanish painters who met at the Antico Caffè Greco, including Luis Álvarez Catalá, Dióscoro Puebla, José Casado del Alisal, Eduardo Rosales, Benet Mercadé, Marià Fortuny and Alejo Vera. He participated in the National Exhibition in 1862 with two works he created in Italy, winning a First-Class Medal. The following year, he returned to Italy and remained until 1866.

After his return to the Court, he won a Gold Medal at the National Exhibition of 1867. That same year, he accompanied the Spanish delegation to the Exposition Universelle in Paris. While there, he met Ernest Meissonier, who would have an influence on his later work. Over the next few years, he would become a renowned portrait painter. In 1872, he was named a Professor at the Real Academia de Bellas Artes de San Fernando. A year later, he settled in Paris and specialized in creating "tableautins"; small format paintings on amusing or pleasant themes designed to be hung in the home. In 1883, he moved to Rome to become Director of the Academia Española de Bellas Artes de Roma.

He returned to Madrid in 1894 when he was appointed Director of the Museo del Prado, a position he would hold until his death. Following a Royal directive, he set up a commission (consisting of himself, the Secretary and the museum's curators) to examine donated works and decide whether to accept or reject them, pursuant to maintaining the quality of the collection. He also oversaw maintenance, which included replacing the wooden roofs with metallic ones. A planned heating system was cancelled due to lack of funds. To help prevent fires, the employee's living quarters were moved to a new extension, built under the direction of architect Fernando Arbós y Tremanti. Most of the works added to the Prado during his tenure were later moved to the collection at the new Museo de Arte Moderno.

He suffered a stroke while attending a theatrical performance, became an invalid, and died several months later in Madrid, aged 61.

== See also ==
- List of Orientalist artists
- Orientalism
