= El sueño de Calpurnia =

1861 painting by Luis Álvarez Catalá

- Artist: Luis Álvarez Catalá
- Year: 1861
- Location: Museo del Prado

El sueño de Calpurnia (Calpurnia's Dream, also called Calpurnia, the wife of Julius Caesar) is an 1861 painting by Luis Álvarez Catalá which depicts the nightmare Calpurnia had the night before the death of her husband Julius Caesar. The work won Álvarez a Gold Medal at the first National Exposition of Florence and a second place at the National Exhibition of Fine Arts of Spain in 1862.
