= Battle of Lepanto (disambiguation) =

The Battle of Lepanto was fought in 1571 and resulted in the Holy League's victory over the Ottoman fleet.

There are many paintings titled The Battle of Lepanto, including:

- The Battle of Lepanto (Luna painting) (1887), by Filipino painter and revolutionary Juan Luna

Other works:

- "Lepanto", a 1911 poem by G. K. Chesterton

== See also ==
Three earlier battles were fought in the vicinity of Naupactus (Lepanto):

- Battle of Naupactus in 429 BC, an Athenian victory during the Peloponnesian War
- Battle of Zonchio in 1499, an Ottoman victory during the Ottoman-Venetian Wars
- Battle of Modon (1500) in 1500, an Ottoman victory during the Ottoman-Venetian Wars
