= Viñuelas =

Viñuelas, Spain
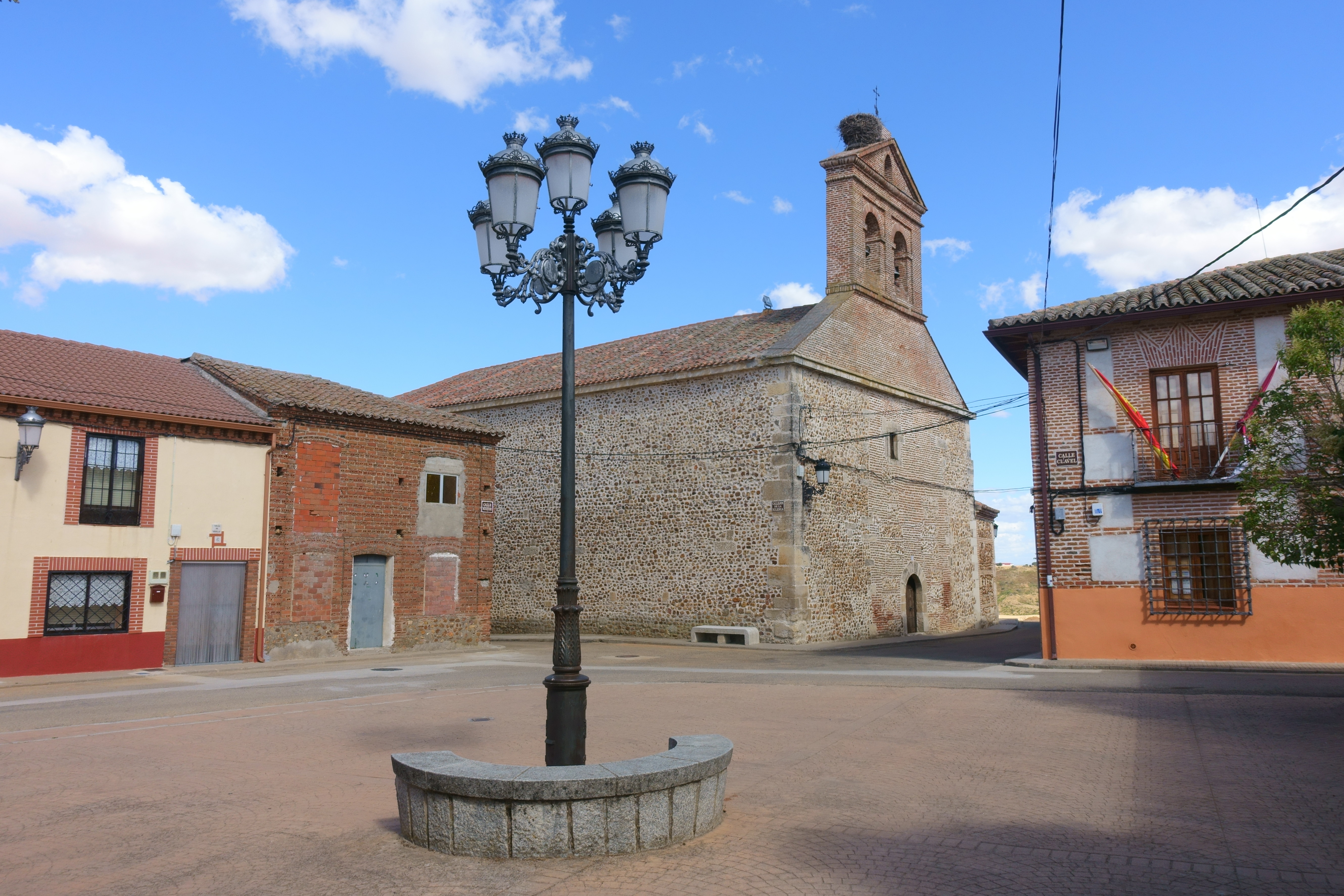

- Coat of arms

- Location within Province of Guadalajara Location within Castilla-La Mancha Location within Spain
- Coordinates: 40°47′47″N 3°20′32″W
- Country: Spain
- Autonomous community: Castile-La Mancha
- Province: Guadalajara
- Municipality: Viñuelas

Area
  - Total: 15 km^{2} (5.8 sq mi)

Population (2025-01-01)
  - Total: 181
  - Density: 12/km^{2} (31/sq mi)
- Time zone: UTC+1 (CET)
  - Summer (DST): UTC+2 (CEST)

Viñuelas is a municipality located in the province of Guadalajara, Castile-La Mancha, Spain. According to the 2004 census (INE), the municipality has a population of 118 inhabitants.
