= Italian ship Lepanto =

List of ships with the same or similar names

Lepanto has been borne by at least two ships of the Italian Navy and may refer to:

- Italian ironclad Lepanto, an Italia-class ironclad launched in 1883 and scrapped in 1915.
- Italian minelayer Lepanto, an Azio-class minelayer launched in 1927. She was scuttled in 1943 but later raised and commissioned by Japan as Okitsu. In 1945 she was surrendered to the Republic of China who named her Hsien Ning. She was decommissioned in 1956.
