= Spanish ship Lepanto =

Various Spanish Navy ships

Four ships of the Spanish Navy have borne the name Lepanto, after the Battle of Lepanto in 1571:

- Spanish gunboat Lepanto, an armed paddle steamer built in 1846, decommissioned in 1882, and stricken in 1884.
- Spanish cruiser Lepanto, a Reina Regente-class protected cruiser commissioned in 1899 and decommissioned in 1908.
- Spanish destroyer Lepanto, a Churruca-class destroyer commissioned in 1930 and decommissioned in 1957.
- Lepanto (D21), formerly USS Capps, a Fletcher-class destroyer acquired in 1957 and decommissioned in 1985
