= Peuple et Rois =

Painting by Juan Luna

Peuple et Rois (People and Kings) is the French title of an 1892 painting by Juan Luna. Finished in the academic style of painting, Luna intended to send and enter Peuple et Rois for the 1892 Chicago Universal Exposition in the United States, but the plan was aborted when Luna shot his wife and mother-in-law because he suspected his wife of having an affair with a French doctor. Luna was acquitted for murder by the French court on February 3, 1893.

Luna painted Peuple et Rois after attaining fame for winning a gold for Spoliarium during the 1884 Exposición General de Bellas Artes in Madrid, Spain. The painting was destroyed in WWII.
