= IRIS Distribution =

American marketing company

- Type: Private
- Industry: Digital marketing and distribution
- Founded: 2003 in San Francisco, United States
- Founders: Matt Laszuk (CEO), Bryn Boughton (CMO), Vic Sarjoo (CFO) and Eric Ferraro (General Counsel)
- Defunct: May 2012
- Headquarters: San Francisco, USA
- Area served: Worldwide
- Key people: Matt Laszuk (CEO), Bryn Boughton (CMO), Vic Sarjoo (CFO) and Eric Ferraro (General Counsel)
- Products: Distribution and promotion of digital music, ringtones, and video
- Services: technical, marketing, and legal services
- Owner: The Orchard
- Website: www.theorchard.com

IRIS Distribution (for Independent Recording Industry Services) was a digital music distribution and marketing firm based in San Francisco. Co-founded by Matt Laszuk (CEO), Bryn Boughton (CMO) and Eric Ferraro (General Counsel) in 2003, IRIS distributed digital music, ringtones, and video to over 450 digital retailers in over 85 countries. It also promoted label catalogs through various outlets, including social networking sites, newsletters, and label profiles. The company offered technical, marketing, and legal services to independent artists and labels from all genres. Artists distributed by IRIS included She Wants Revenge, Le Tigre, Lou Reed, and Mogwai.

IRIS Distribution was acquired by The Orchard, a division of Sony in 2012.

== History ==
In 2003, after the launch of Apple's iTunes digital music store, IRIS Distribution was founded to support independent labels entering the digital marketplace. IRIS began as a co-op for independent artists, but soon became a distribution company specializing in facilitating negotiations between retail services and independent labels.

IRIS Distribution's first digital distribution deals were with Force Inc. and Megaforce Records. It added more labels in 2005.

IRIS launched a podcast with Live365 in 2005. In 2007, IRIS launched BlinkerActive, a dedicated marketing arm devoted to music promotion and branded entertainment. Some of BlinkerActive's clients included Scion/Toyota, Ninja Tune, Chemikal Underground, Surfdog Records, BYO Records, and Mack Avenue Records. IRIS reported strong growth and profitability in 2008.

IRIS Distribution placed twice in The National Association of Record Industry Professionals’ poll, Best In The Biz (2009); IRIS placed second in the ‘Best Digital Distribution Company’ category, and Bryn Boughton as ‘Top New Media Representative.’

In May 2012 New York City-based digital distributor The Orchard acquired IRIS Distribution. This consolidation came only two months after The Orchard had merged with IODA Distribution.

== Labels distributed by IRIS ==
This is not a complete list.

- +1 Music
- AGF Producktion
- Affluent Records
- Ant Zen / Salt
- Beta-lactam Ring Records
- Big Dada
- Chemikal Underground
- Coco Machete Records
- Duck Down Records
- Gemini Sun Records
- Hefty Records
- Hymen Records
- Konfort Records
- Kranky
- K Records
- Megaforce Records
- Minus Records
- Mutek
- Monolake Records
- Moodgadget Records
- Ninja Tune Records
- Palmetto Records
- Projekt Records
- Seed Records
- Static Discos Records
- Wednesday Records
- YouRelease Distribution
