= The Battle of Lepanto (Luna painting) =

Lost Painting of Juan Luna

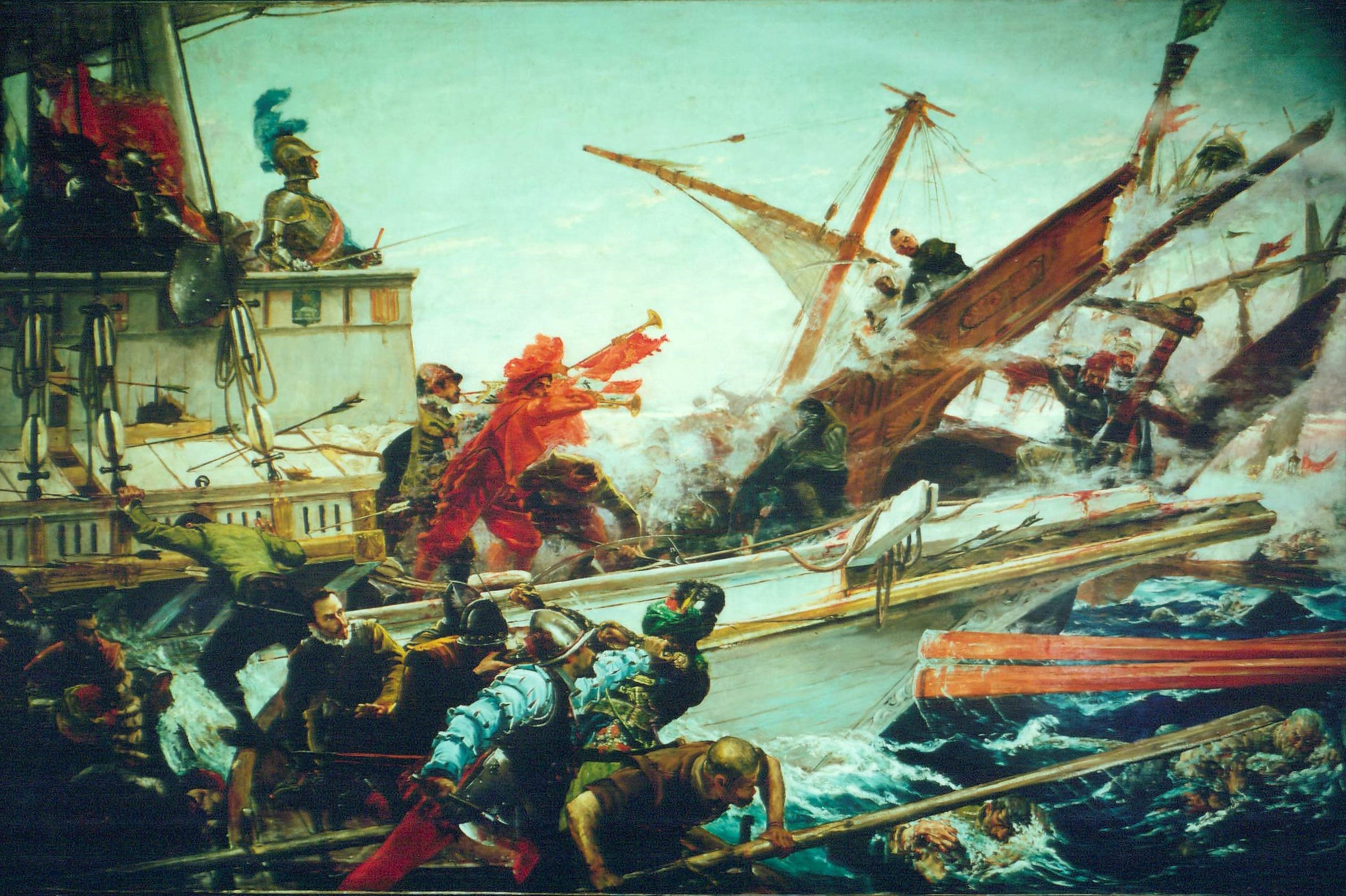
- Artist: Juan Luna
- Year: 1887
- Medium: Oil on canvas
- Dimensions: 350 cm × 550 cm (140 in × 220 in)
- Location: Palacio del Senado, Centro, Madrid

The Battle of Lepanto (Spanish: La Batalla de Lepanto) is a painting by Filipino painter and revolutionary activist Juan Luna. Along with Félix Resurrección Hidalgo, Luna is one of the first Filipinos to excel and earn recognition in the international field of arts and culture.

Painted by Luna in 1887, the masterpiece is about the Battle of Lepanto of October 7, 1571. The painting features Don Juan of Austria (also known as Don John of Austria) in battle while at the bow of a ship.

It is one of the “huge epic canvasses” painted by Luna (the others are the Spoliarium and The Blood Compact).

== Historical significance ==
By becoming the second Filipino to win the first of the three gold medals during the Exposicion General de Bellas Artes (National Exposition of Fine Arts) in Madrid, Spain in 1884 for his Spoliarium painting, Luna became famous and obtained commissions from the Spanish government to create other canvasses. Although Luna decided to move from Madrid to Paris, France in October 1884, he had to travel back and forth the two cities in order to meet the demands for portrait jobs, including the task of assisting Filipinos to push for reforms in the Philippines through the seat of the government of Spain in Madrid. Some of the commissioned paintings were The Battle of Lepanto, together with Peuple et Rois and España y Filipinas. It was the Spanish Senate, through the influence of King Alfonso XII of Spain, who commissioned Luna to paint The Battle of Lepanto. King Alfonso XII's plan was to hang Luna’s Battle of Lepanto side by side with Francisco Pradilla Ortiz’s 1878 grand-prize winning masterpiece La rendicion de granada (The Surrender of Granada). Another reason for commissioning Luna to paint The Battle of Lepanto was to compensate Luna for not having been given the grand prize known as the “Prize of Honor” or “Medal of Excellence” for Spoliarium. A biased jury, known as the "Jury of Honor" did not grant Luna the prize because he was a Filipino and in spite of the fact that “public sentiment felt” Luna “deserved the award”. One year after, The Battle of Lepanto became a gold medalist during the 1888 Fine Arts Exhibition in Barcelona, Spain. During the victory gathering of Filipinos in Madrid, Philippine national hero José Rizal praised Luna and Hidalgo for their achievements, “mastery and nationalism” through a speech. Graciano Lopez Jaena, another Filipino hero, also gave Luna and Hidalgo a “congratulatory speech” for their success.

== Description ==
Luna’s The Battle of Lepanto provides significance to the “Spanish victory against the Turks”. For this reason, the widow of King Alfonso XII of Spain, Queen Regent Maria Christina of Austria, herself was the person who unveiled Luna’s masterpiece at the Senate Hall of Madrid in November 1887, together with Pradilla’s La rendición de granada.

However, the victory at Lepanto was not merely a Spanish victory against the Turks. The victory at Lepanto was a Catholic victory over the invading forces of Islam. At Lepanto, a coalition of Catholics defeated the forces of Islam who were attempting to conquer and subdue the West to force her citizens to submit to Islamic rule.

Therefore, this painting is a portrayal of national pride because the Spanish were instrumental in the victory at Lepanto and it is also a portrayal of pride in the Catholicism of Spaniards since the battle resulted in a Catholic victory. Both paintings are still currently displayed at the Madrid Senate Hall.

Luna also received, through the royal order of Queen Regent Maria Christina, the Medalla de Isabela La Católica (Medal of Elizabeth the Catholic) from the Ministry of the High Seas (Ministerio de Ultramar), for the Filipino's “outstanding service” to Spain.
