= Paz Pardo de Tavera =

Filipina murder victim, wife of Juan Luna (1862–1892)

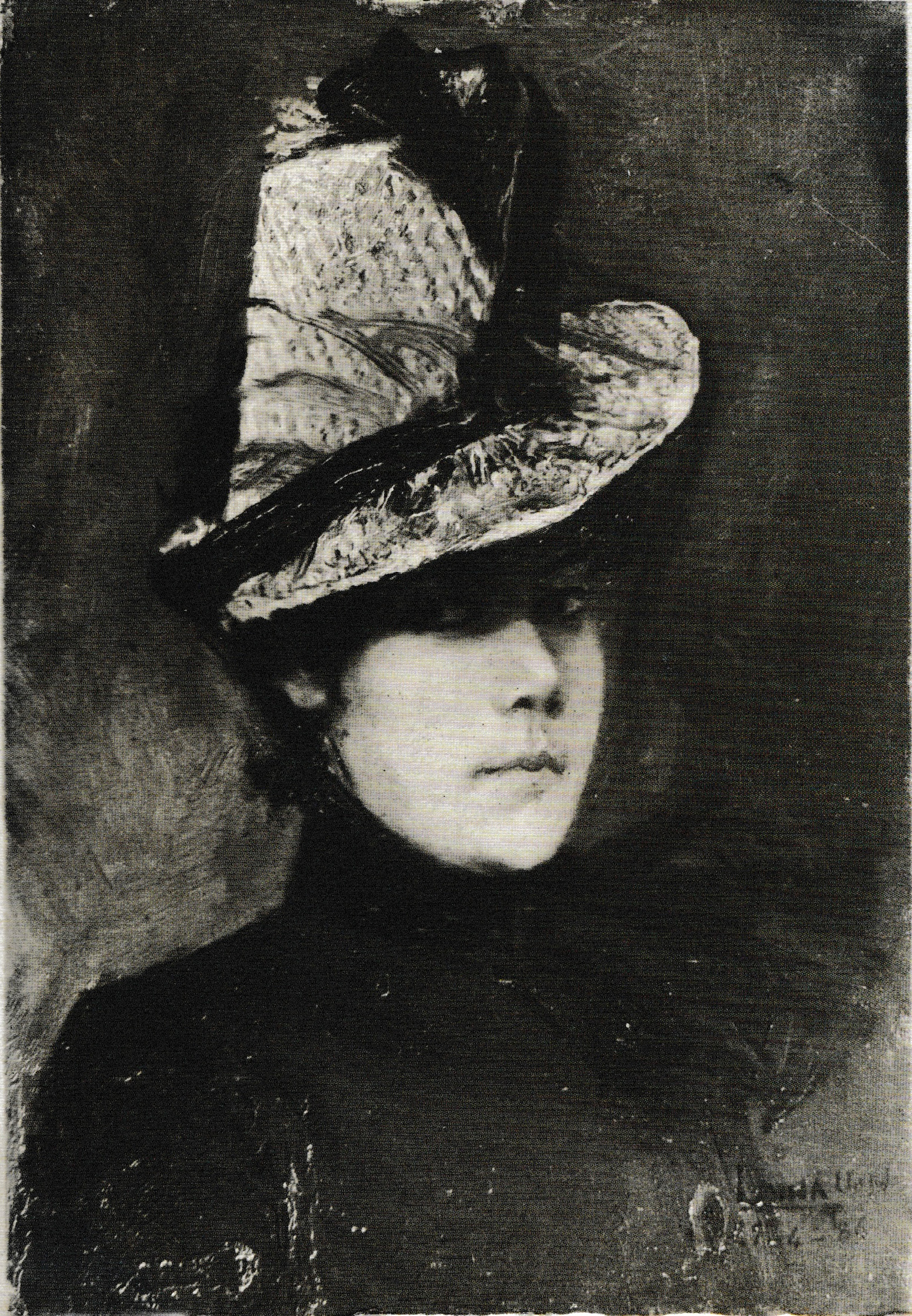
- Portrait of Paz Pardo de Tavera by Juan Luna (1886)
- Born: María de la Paz Paulina Amparo Consolación Socorro Vicenta Romana Lutgarda Pardo de Tavera y Gorricho c. 1862; Captaincy General of the Philippines
- Died: 3 October 1892 (aged 29–30); Paris, France
- Cause of death: Murder
- Spouse: Juan Luna (m. 1886–1892)
- Children: 2, including Andrés
- Parent(s): Félix Pardo de Tavera y Gómez-González; Juliana Gorricho y Santos
- Relatives: Juan VI Pardo de Tavera (ancestor); Trinidad Pardo de Tavera (brother); Félix Pardo de Tavera (brother)

Maria de la Paz Pardo de Tavera y Gorricho (died 3 or 6 October 1892) was a Philippine mestiza and wife of Filipino painter Juan Luna. Though born in the Philippines, she and her family moved to Paris some time after her father Félix's death in 1864. She had two children with Luna: Andrés and María de la Paz, though the latter died when she was three years old.

On 22 September 1892, after being accused of adultery, Pardo de Tavera was shot by Luna in their atelier in Villa Dupont [fr] alongside her mother Juliana Gorricho and her brother Félix, with the latter surviving the incident. Pardo de Tavera died from her gunshot wounds eleven days after the said incident, in a hospital.

She was the daughter of Trinidad Pardo de Tavera (from Tavira), of Portuguese-Spanish descent.
