= Lepanto (poem) =

1915 poem by G. K. Chesterton

Painting of the Battle of Lepanto. Unknown artist, after a print by Martin Rota, National Maritime Museum, Greenwich, London

"Lepanto" is a poem by G. K. Chesterton celebrating the victory of the Holy League in the Battle of Lepanto (1571) written in irregular stanzas of rhyming, roughly paeonic tetrameter couplets, often ending in a quatrain of four dimeter lines. The poem tells of the defeat of the Ottoman fleet of Ali Pasha by the Christian crusader, Don John of Austria. The poem was written in 1911 and published in Chesterton's 1915 collection Poems.

The ballad's stirring verses helped inspire soldiers such as John Buchan during World War I. Indeed, in the opinion of Chesterton's friend and contemporary, Hilaire Belloc, the poem was "the summit of high rhetorical verse in all our generation".

== Context ==
"Lepanto" was published in 1915, and is in line with the author's other works of early decades of the century as representing a spirited rejection of the fin de siècle Decadent Fatalism which was the dominating philosophy in his youth. As in the author's "The Ballad of the White Horse," the non-Christian forces are made representative of the determinist or fatalist philosophy that (in Chesterton's view) denied the value of human struggle and free will, and which he variously personified as pagan or Germanic (as in "The Ballad of the White Horse") or Mohammedan or Calvinist (as in this poem).

In World War I, the Turkish Ottoman Empire had become an ally of the Prussian enemy whom Chesterton saw as the perfect epitome of Paganism, Germanism, Imperialism, and Determinist Materialism. In this context, the victory of Christian Europe over its Turkish enemy depicted by Chesterton in vividly blood-stained terms became readily acceptable to those sympathetic to the British cause as a straightforward allegory of right — the Allied nations representing the traditional morality of Christendom — triumphing over wrong — the Central Powers representing the rejection of that morality in the name of the previously mentioned "-isms".
