= Heyman, Iran =

Heyman هي من
- Village
- Location within Iran
- Coordinates: 25°45′02″N 58°37′38″E
- Country: Iran
- Province: Hormozgan
- County: Jask
- Bakhsh: Central
- Rural District: Gabrik

Population (2006)
  - Total: 225
- Time zone: UTC+3:30 (IRST)
  - Summer (DST): UTC+4:30 (IRDT)

Heyman (Persian: هي من, also Romanized as Hīman, and Hīmen; also known as Haimīn and Heymīn) is a village in Gabrik Rural District, in the Central District of Jask County, Hormozgan Province, Iran. At the 2006 census, its population was 225, in 51 families.
