= Alejo Vera =

Spanish artist (1834–1923)

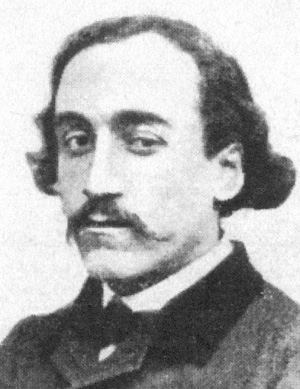
Alejo Vera (1861)

Alejo Vera y Estaca (14 July 1834, Viñuelas – 4 February 1923, Madrid) was a Spanish painter in the Romantic style who specialized in history painting.

== Biography ==
At an early age, his teachers in the public school noticed that he had an aptitude for drawing, so they got together to request a study grant from the government of Guadalajara Province. It was given, and he began his studies at the Escuela de Bellas Artes de San Fernando in Madrid. Later, he obtained a position in the workshop of Federico de Madrazo.

With the help of a local banker, he went to Italy, where he became fascinated by the ruins of Pompeii; an influence that can be readily perceived in his later works. One of his first major works there was the "Entierro de San Lorenzo en las Catacumbas de Roma" (The Burial of Saint Lawrence in the Catacombs of Rome), which he sent to the National Exhibition of Fine Arts in 1862, where he received the First-Class Medal. In 1866, he received another for his painting of Saint Valerius.

From 1874 to 1878, he was a professor at San Fernando and painted the ceiling of the Madrid Chamber of Commerce with a scene called the "Allegory of Abundance". In 1878, he obtained a position at the newly created Spanish Academy in Rome, where he painted what is perhaps his best-known work, "Numancia" (also known as "Numancia's Last Day"), which later won First Prize at the National Exhibition in 1881.

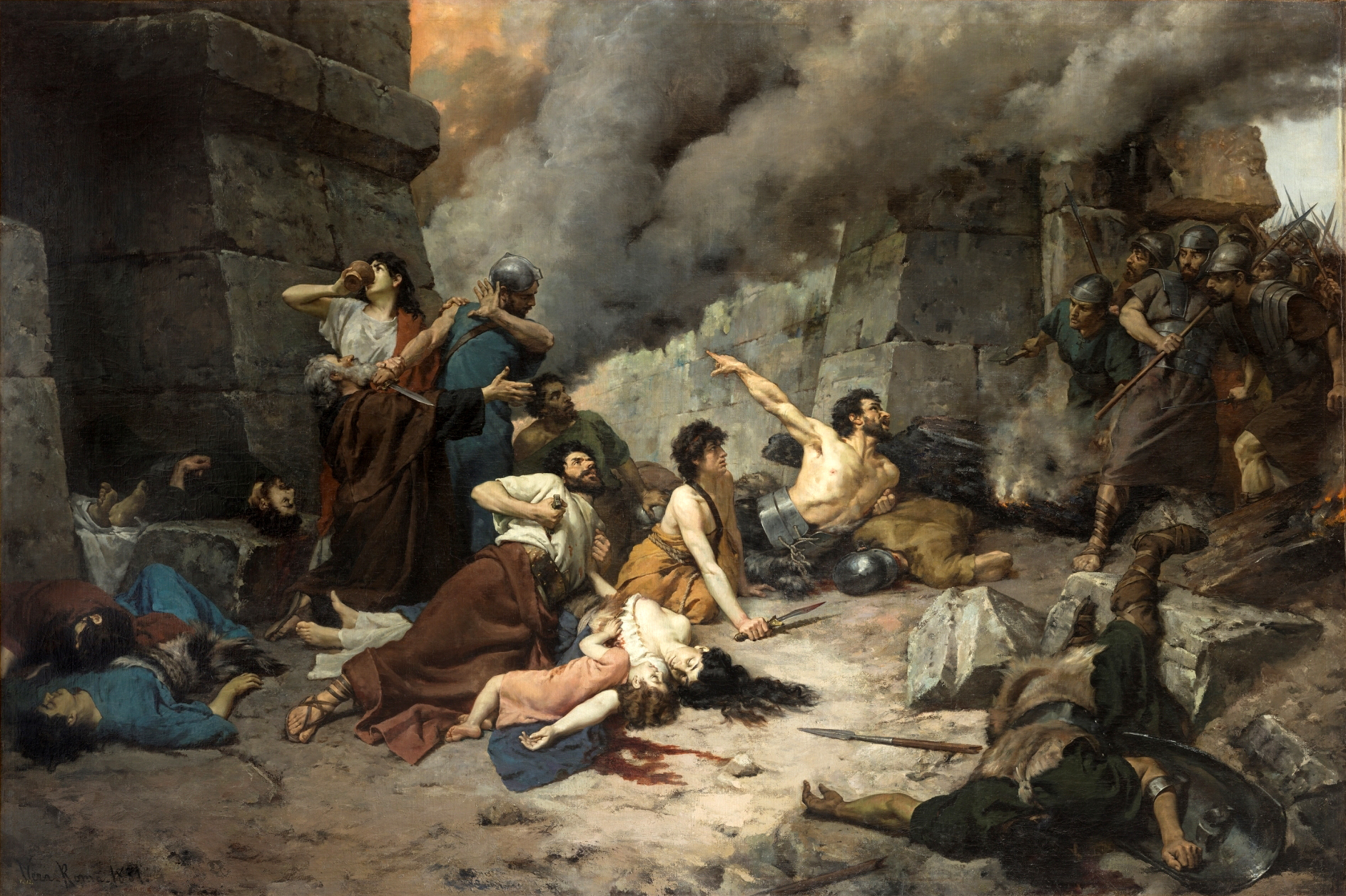
Numantia (1880)

He was initially part of the team designated to work on decorating the San Francisco el Grande Basilica in Madrid, but was ultimately excluded because of a dispute with the governing board over remuneration. Some of the sketches for that failed project were used for his painting "El milagro de las rosas" (The Miracle of the Roses), based on an episode in the life of Saint Francis of Assisi.

In 1891, he became the Director at the Spanish Academy; a position he held for six years, after which he retired and returned to Spain. He continued to teach and actively participate in exhibitions until 1919, when his health would no longer allow it. As per his wishes, his death was not announced until after his burial.
