= Women in Philippine art =

Women in Philippine art is the many forms of art in the Philippines that utilizes women in the Philippines and even women from other parts of the world as the main subject depending on the purpose of the Filipino artist. The portrayal of women in the visual arts depend on the context on how Philippine society perceives women and their roles in human communities, such as their own.

== Women in paintings ==
In the field of painting, Filipino visual artists depicted women in their painting as women who are influential and with authority, women who are engaged in domestic activities, and women who are shown to be under the control of influential men in the Philippines or foreign men.

=== Amorsolo's women ===
In painting the faces and figures of Filipino women, Philippine National Artist Fernando Amorsolo (1892-1972) was able to develop his own template on how to paint and create Filipino women in his art: women with rounded faces but not oval, with "exceptionally lively eyes" (not dreamy or sleepy), with "firm and strongly marked" noses (not blunt in form), with clear skin and fresh color, not necessarily of white complexion nor of dark brown Malayan color. Amorsolo painted Filipino women that is similar to the stature of a "blushing" girl.

=== Luna's women ===
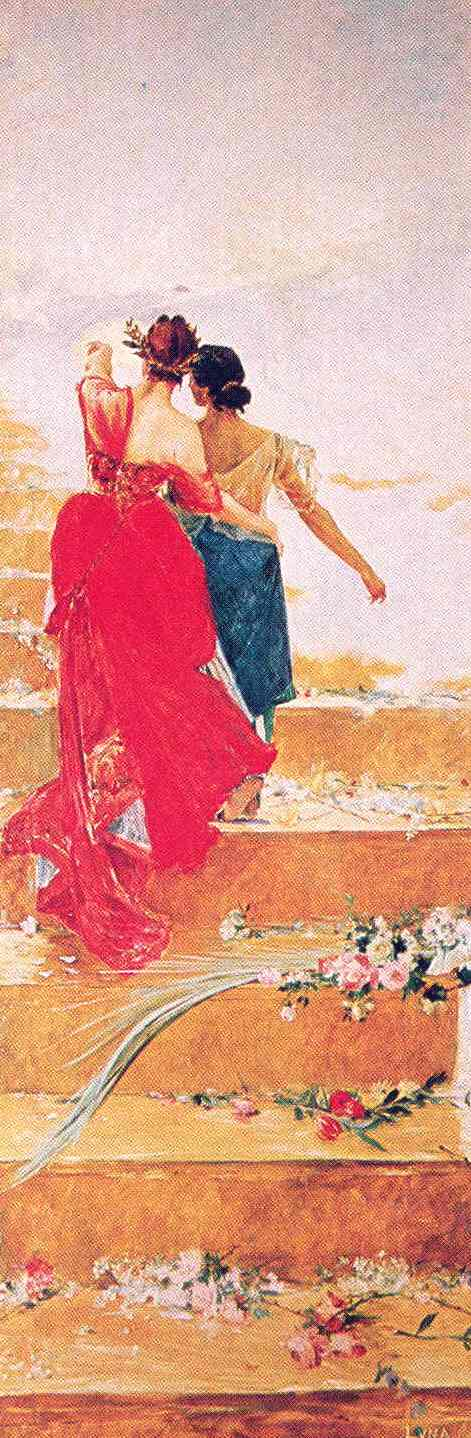
España y Filipinas (1886) by Juan Luna

In contrast, Filipino painter, sculptor, ilustrado, propagandist, political activist and revolutionary hero Juan Luna (1857–1899) painted women in a different light. In his painting known as España y Filipinas ("Spain and the Philippines", 1886), Luna used symbolism and allegory by rendering a taller and strong-shouldered maternal Spaniard woman (representing Spain and colonialism) guiding a shorter, graceful and "humbly dressed" Filipino woman (representing the Philippines) towards the way to progress.

Prolific in his career as a painter, Luna produced scenes that depict Philippine and European life. Luna's portrayal of European women can be seen in his Las Damas Romanas (Roman Women, 1882), the Odalisque (1885), La Madrileña (The Woman from Madrid, c. 1880s), En el Balcon (At the Balcony, 1884), Picnic in Normany (c. 1880s), The Parisian Life (1892), Despues del Baile (After the Dance, c. 1880s), Street Flower Vendor (c. 1880s), Ensueños de Amor (Dreams of Love, c. 1890s), Mi Novia (My Girlfriend) and La Marquesa de Monte Bolivar (The Marchioness of Monte Olivar, 1881). Luna's depiction of Filipino women can be viewed in Tampuhan (1895), La Bulaqueña (The Woman from Bulacan, 1895), Nena y Tinita (Nena and Tinita, c. 1880s). Luna also painted a scene depicting Egyptian women in his La Muerte de Cleopatra (The Death of Cleopatra, 1881).

=== Hidalgo's women ===
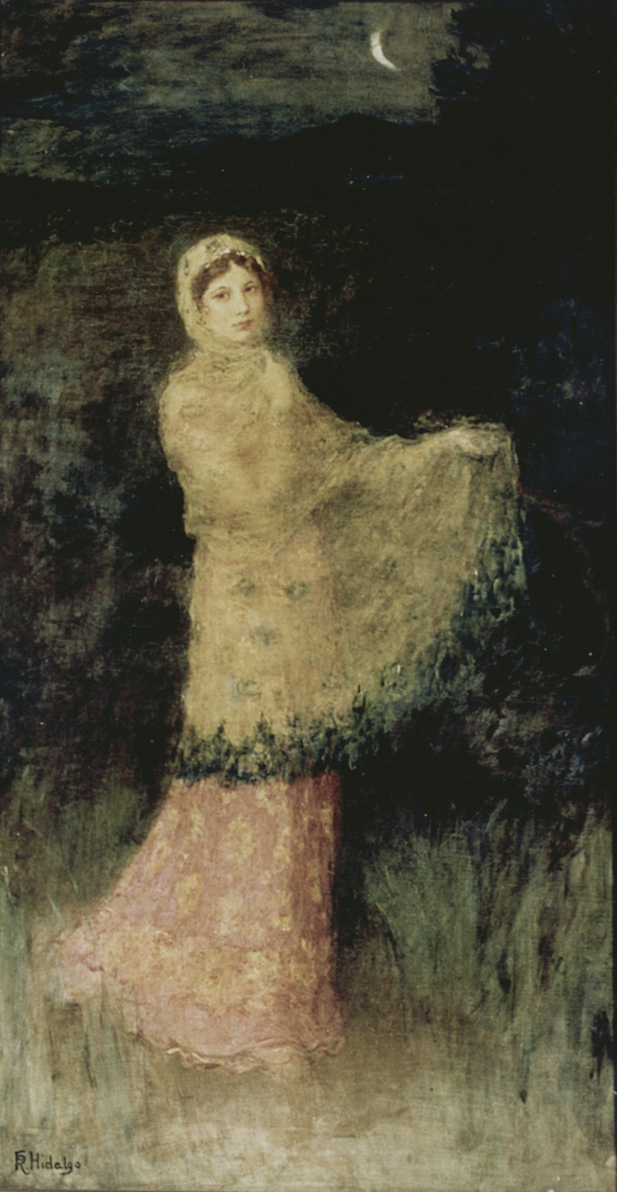
A Lady in the Moonlight (undated) by Félix Resurrección Hidalgo

Félix Resurrección Hidalgo (1855-1913), one of the great Filipino painters of the late 19th century, has his fair share of artistic contribution in painting historical female characters through the visual arts during his time. Hidalgo's Las Virgenes Cristianas Expuestas al Populacho (Christian Virgins Exposed to the Mob, 1884) recounting the suffering that women has experienced during the period in ancient Roman history when the persecution of Christians in Ancient Rome occurred. Presented in the masterpiece were two almost nude female slaves (symbolizing Filipino women), helpless and stripped of dignity, being auctioned to boorish and sexually-hungry Roman male onlookers. Hidalgo also has a painting of a caucasian woman titled A lady in the Moonlight (undated).

=== Other painters ===
Fabián de la Rosa, the mentor and uncle of Fernando Amorsolo and his brother Pablo Amorsolo (1898–1945) had his own technique of painting women. De la Rosa painted a group of Women Working in a Rice Field in 1902 and his portrait of a Young Filipina in 1928. Pablo Amorsolo himself painted his own rendition of a female Fruit Vendor (undated).

== Women in sculptures ==
=== Rizal's women ===
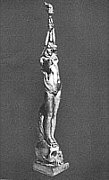
The Triumph of Science over Death (1890) by José Rizal

Painter, sculptor, writer, revolutionary and Philippine national hero José Rizal (1861-1896) also used the theme of a woman of power in his sculptures. His clay sculpture known as The Triumph of Science over Death (also known as Scientia, 1890) was a rendering of a naked and young woman with overflowing hair standing and trampling a skull while bearing a torch held high. The sculpture symbolized the ignorance of humankind during the Dark Ages. The torch being held by the woman signified the victory and enlightenment that humankind has received by vanquishing death through science. In another sculpture known as the Victory of Death over Life (1890), Rizal portrayed a woman that was limp and lifeless against the hold and embrace of a cloaked figure of a standing skeleton (the symbol of death). Rizal also sculpted another figure of a woman known as the Reclining Nude (1890). Rizal's technique of molding women into sculptures involved the rendering of the young female body as a representation of vitality and virtue. Rizal's "sculptured women", as described by Raquel A. G. Reyes in her book Love, Passion and Patriotism: Sexuality and the Philippine Propaganda Movement, 1882 - 1892 were smooth, young, with unblemished condition, with traditional signs of long abundant and flowing hair on the head, with rounded conical breasts, and with absence of pubic hair on the genital area. This overall softness and fluidity were a contrasting effect against the hardness of the escayola material used by Rizal in sculpting these women. Rizal had drawn a sketch, using crayons, of his former girlfriend Leonor Rivera.

== Women and sexuality in Philippine art ==
As one example of women in Philippine art, Rizal's three sculptures (as discussed above) were described by Raquel A. G. Reyes as a "rare representation of the insatiable female sexuality that Rizal (...) attributed to the non-Filipino woman". Reyes further explained that Rizal did not want women in the Philippines to "imitate or to emulate" the foreign women, such as the European women of his time, who were the basis of his sculptures.

== See also ==
- Filipino women artists
- Women in art
- History of painting (see Filipino Painting section)
