= The Blood Compact =

1886 painting by Juan Luna

- El Pacto de Sangre (Spanish), Ang Sanduguan (Filipino)
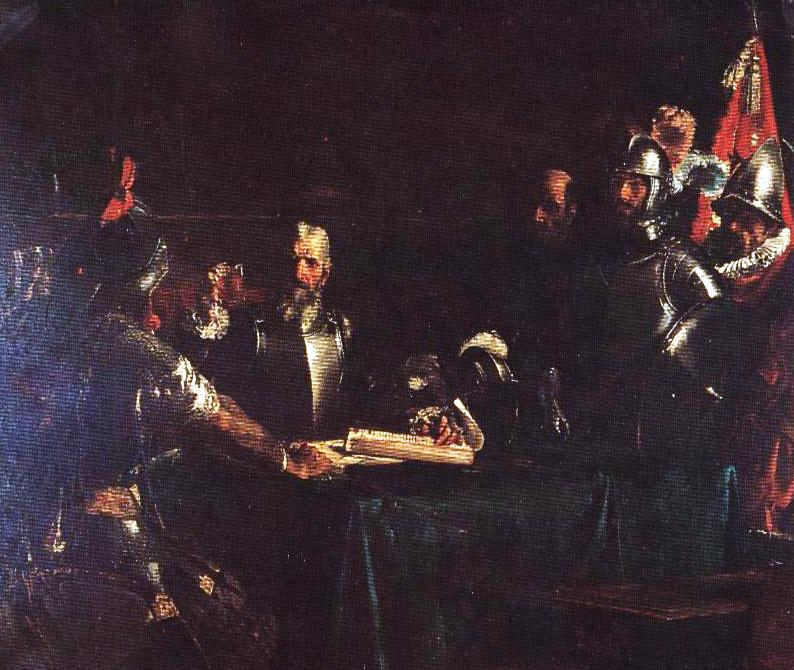
- Artist: Juan Luna
- Year: 1886
- Location: Malacañan Palace

The Blood Compact (Spanish: El Pacto de Sangre) is an 1886 historical painting by the Filipino painter Juan Luna. It was a gift to the Manila city council (Ayuntamiento de Manila).

== Description ==
The Blood Compact portrays the 1565 Sandugo (blood compact ritual) between Datu Sikatuna of Bohol and Miguel López de Legazpi, surrounded by other conquistadors. The ritual was performed in the island of Bohol to seal their friendship following tribal tradition. Sikatuna was described to be 'being crowded out of the picture by Miguel López de Legazpi and his fellow conquistadores'.

== Historical background ==
Juan Luna completed The Blood Compact in 1886, a year after he moved to Paris to open a studio. It was also the year after Luna became a friend of Félix Resurrección Hidalgo, another known Filipino painter. In 1904, the painting won the first prize in Paris, France and at the St. Louis Exposition in the United States. The masterpiece was painted by Luna during his four-year pensionadoship from the Ayuntamiento de Manila, enabling him to continue studying painting in Rome. It is one of the three paintings Luna gave to the Government of Spain, even though he was only obligated to paint just one canvas during the pensionadoship. The other paintings are Don Miguel Lopez de Legazpi, a painting that was burned during the Philippine Revolution, and Governor Ramon Blanco, a work that became a part of the Lopez Museum collection. This is one of the last paintings created by Luna.

José Rizal and Trinidad H. Pardo de Tavera helped Luna in completing the painting by providing historical advice and posing for the painter: Rizal posed as Sikatuna while Pardo de Tavera posed as Legazpi.

The Blood Compact is currently displayed in Malacañan Palace, the official residence of the President of the Philippines, located at the top of the Grand Staircase leading towards the Ceremonial Hall.

== Exhibition ==
In 2008, The Blood Compact and other Luna works became a part of a twenty-three painting exhibition from the collection of the Bank of the Philippine Islands. The public exhibition celebrated the thirtieth anniversary of the Bank of the Philippines Islands, and marked the first time that the so-called "BPI collection" was shown to the public. The Blood Compact and the other paintings are considered as the 'expression of the coming of the age of the Filipino and the birth of the Philippines as a nation in the late 19th century.'

== See also ==
- Spoliarium
- España y Filipinas
- Las Damas Romanas
- The Death of Cleopatra
