= La barca de Aqueronte =

1887 painting by Félix Resurrección Hidalgo

La Barca de Aqueronte
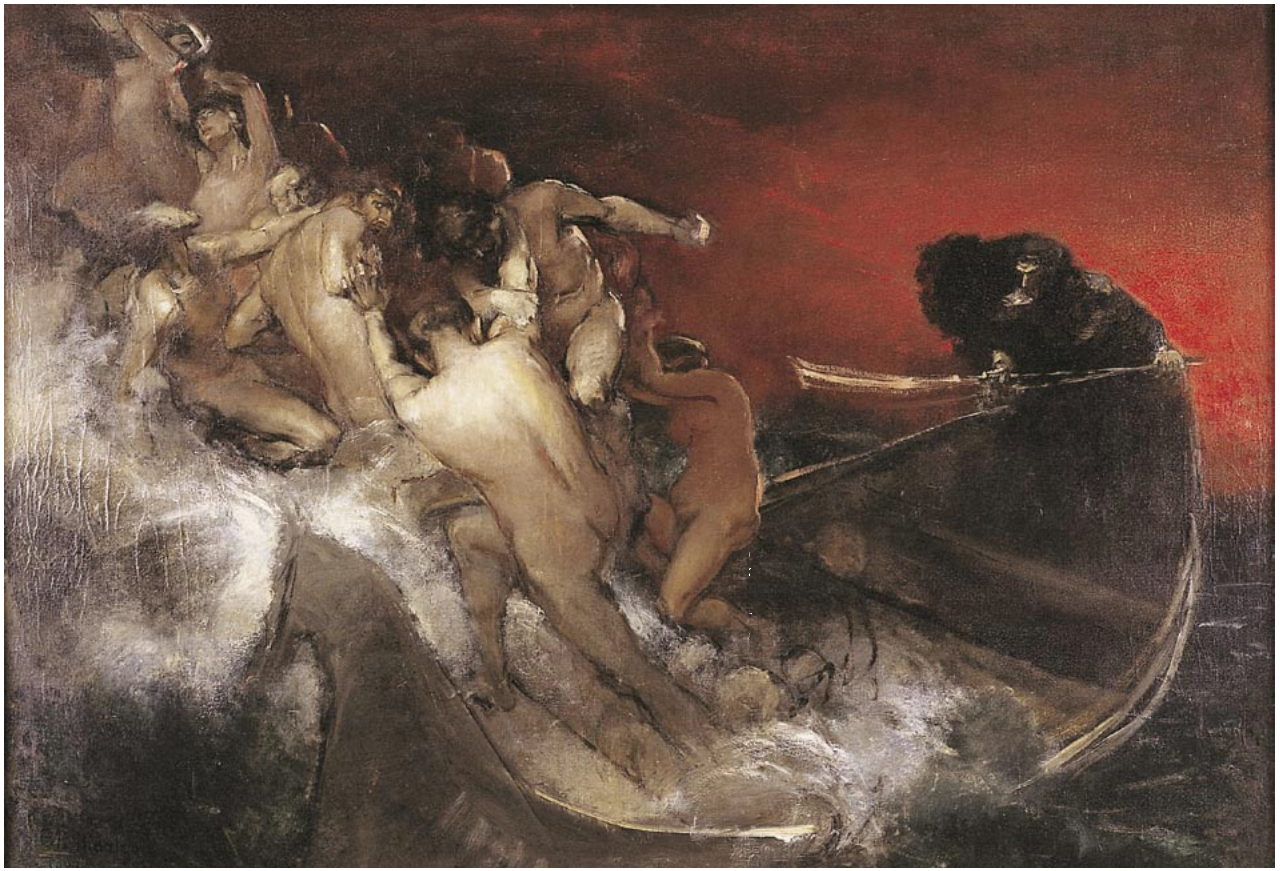
- Artist: Félix Resurrección Hidalgo
- Year: 1887
- Medium: Oil on canvas
- Dimensions: 80.65 cm × 108.59 cm (31.75 in × 42.75 in)
- Location: Philippine National Museum of Fine Art

La barca de Aqueronte, translated in English as The Boat of Charon or Charon's Boat, is an 1887 oil-on-canvas and allegorical painting by the Filipino painter Félix Resurrección Hidalgo. The work was a gold medalist during the Exposicion General de las Filipinas (International Philippine Exposition) in Madrid. In 1889, an international jury made the painting a silver medalist during the Paris Exposition, a distinct recognition that no other Filipino painter had achieved at the major art arena in Paris. The painting also won other awards such as a diploma of honor from the 1891 Exposicion General de Bellas Artes in Barcelona, a gold medal prize at the 1893 Madrid Exposicion Internacional de Bellas Artes during the 400th Anniversary of the Discovery of the Americas. The Government of Spain bought the work of art through a royal decree for the amount of 7,500 pesetas on March 7, 1893. After displaying the artwork at the Museo-Biblioteca de Ultramar (Ultramar Library Museum) and at the Museo de Arte Moderno, La barca de Aqueronte is currently placed at Madrid’s Museo Nacional de Pintura (National Museum of Paintings), after the Philippines became a United States territory in 1898. A smaller study of the same painting in the collection of the Lopez Museum in the Philippines.

La barca de Aqueronte became Hidalgo's most awarded work of art. By winning in international exhibitions through La barca de Aqueronte and his other paintings Las Virgenes Cristianas Expuestas al Populacho and Adios del Sol during the last quarter of the nineteenth century, Hidalgo's "mark of having arrived as a painter" and his place in Philippine art and the "popular mind" became secured. Hidalgo was also a recipient of the 1889 Chevalier de la Légion d'honneur.

== Description ==
La Barca de Aqueronte is a Neoclassic-style painting based by Hidalgo on his reading of Dante's Inferno while in Italy. It is Hidalgo’s interpretation of damned souls journeying across the River Acheron towards the gates of hell or Hades. The protagonist of the painting is the boatman of classical mythology named Charon, who is depicted as the personification of the merciless harvester of condemned souls with "eyes of coal" glaring forebodingly from the shadows at the boarding commuters. Charon is presented at the right side of the canvas as a lone figure with a shroud. He is positioned in opposition to a red-colored sky. Charon’s facade is forbidding and obscured in the shadows and his oar is glinting like the rapier of a slayer. An offset on the left side of the image is the "diagonal disturbance" composed of plummeting and helpless unclothed bodies heading into Charon’s water vessel. The “diagonal movement” on the left-side of the painting is described to be subdued shades of pink and blue in "strong tension" with the right side of the work of art. This portion of the painting is the steady "solitary form" in black color going against the shimmering red backdrop. Measuring 80.65 cm x 108.59 cm, La barca de Aqueronte is a "companion piece" to Hidalgo’s other painting, La Laguna Estigia (The River Styx).

== Historical background ==
Hidalgo finished La barca de Aqueronte in 1887 when he was thirty-four years old. Hidalgo made charcoal studies of Charon that are representative of the divine and nude Greco-Roman heroes molded in the Renaissance style. These studies can also be found in the Lopez Museum and Library collection. In the same year, José Rizal, key leader of the Propaganda Movement, published the novel Noli Me Tangere.
