= La Parisienne (Hidalgo) =

Painting by Félix Resurrección Hidalgo

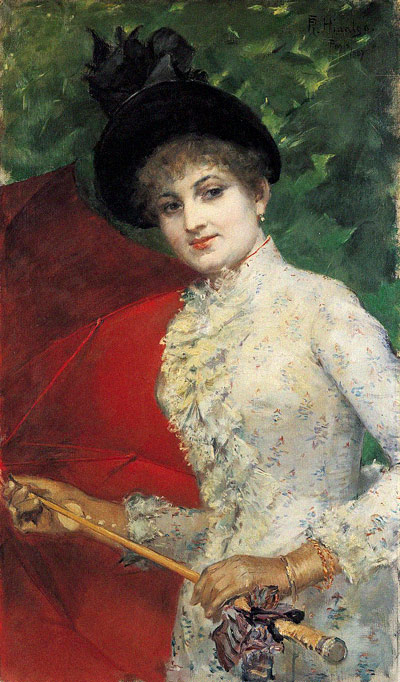
- Artist: Félix Resurrección Hidalgo
- Year: 1889

La Parisienne is a painting of 1889 by the Filipino painter Félix Resurrección Hidalgo. It depicts a woman holding an umbrella known as the parasol, a theme similar to Juan Luna's La Madrileña (En el Balcón). Hidalgo's La Parisienne was the first Philippine work of art to be chosen as a cover for Sotheby's sale catalog due to its importance, rarity, uniqueness, and exclusivity. Before the painting's appearance at Sotheby's Southeast Asian paintings sale in Singapore on April 6, 2003, the last time La Parisienne was exhibited was at the 1889 Paris Exposition Universelle. It is also the only painting of Hidalgo that was featured on the cover of La Illustraccion Española y Americano, a popular weekly magazine in Spain. It appeared on the Spanish magazine's cover on February 28, 2003. Like Luna's La Madrileña (En el Balcon), Hidalgo's La Parisienne is one of two rare paintings created by famous Filipino artists that have not been viewed for a century by the public.

== Description ==
La Parisienne was created by Hidalgo in the impressionist style employing a "light palette". It shows Hidalgo's versatility in using a "different color palette and style" which deviates from his trademark as a "conventional epic painter". The impressionist character of La Parisienne was compared to the style used by James Tissot, as in his Summer painting in 1878 and to Pierre-Auguste Renoir's The Umbrellas in 1879. La Parisienne is the only exhibited masterpiece of Hidalgo that survived in perfect condition because many the artist's award-winning works were missing or ruined during the Spanish Civil War.
