= Adios del Sol =

Painting by Félix Resurrección Hidalgo

- Artist: Félix Resurrección Hidalgo
- Year: 1893
- Location: López Museum and Library, Philippines

Adios del Sol (Farewell to the Sun) or Adios al Sol (Farewell from the Sun) is an 1893 historical painting by the Filipino painter and hero Félix Resurrección Hidalgo. The painting won Hidalgo a silver medal during the 1893 Chicago Universal Exposition in the United States.

== Reception ==
Although created in the "grand manner" style of painting, Adios del Sol is a "seascape with figure" that marked Hidalgo's departure from the traditional way of painting. The masterpiece is also one of the paintings that marked Hidalgo as a reputable painter in Philippine history of art and in the so-called "popular mind" (the other painting is Jovenes Cristianas Expuestas al Populacho).
