= Salcedo Auctions =

Auction house in Makati, Philippines

- Industry: Retail
- Founded: 2010
- Founders: Ramon 'Richie' Lerma; Karen Kua Lerma
- Headquarters: NEX Tower, Ayala Avenue, Makati, Metro Manila, Philippines
- Products: Fine arts, collectibles, jewelry, rare objects
- Services: Auctions
- Subsidiaries: gavel&block
- Website: salcedoauctions.com

Salcedo Auctions is a Philippine fine art and collectibles auction house based in Makati, Metro Manila. Founded in 2010, it was originally located in Salcedo Village, the business district from which it takes its name, before relocating to its current headquarters at NEX Tower on Ayala Avenue, a building designed by the international architectural firm Skidmore, Owings & Merrill.

The auction house has been described by Insider Philippines as “The Barometer of the Philippine Art Market.” Salcedo Auctions is also noted for introducing specialized sales of Philippine art in line with international auction practices and for developing a proprietary, internally developed hybrid system that integrates live and online bidding.

In addition to its public auctions, Salcedo Auctions offers specialized services including appraisal, cataloguing, conservation framing, restoration, logistics services for private individuals and institutions, and private viewings for collectors.

Its major annual events include The Well-Appointed Life, Finer Pursuits, Gavel&Block, and Under the Tree: The Wish List.

Over the years, Salcedo Auctions has undertaken special projects with Filipino artists and estates in connection with the Philippine fine art and collectibles market.

== History ==
Salcedo Auctions is a Philippine auction house established in July 2010 by Richie Lerma, former director and chief curator of the Ateneo Art Gallery, and his wife Karen Kua-Lerma, a certified diamond grader by the Gemological Association of Australia.

The company’s inaugural auction was held in July 2010 in Rockwell and featured a capsule sale of ten paintings by National Artist Victorio Edades. Its premier auction, The Well-Appointed Life: Philippine Art + Objects of Desire, took place on July 24, 2010, at the Mandarin Oriental in Makati City, featuring 90 lots of fine art, jewelry, and antiques.

Since its founding, Salcedo Auctions has expanded into various thematic auctions held annually. In 2017, it introduced Gavel&Block, a subsidiary brand dedicated to contemporary art and design.The company later introduced a hybrid auction system supported by proprietary, internally developed digital bidding platform. Salcedo Auctions has recorded sales of works by Philippine Old Masters as well as modern and contemporary artists. Examples include a boceto (sketch) of Spoliarium by Philippine painter and political activist Juan Luna y Novicio, which sold for ₱63 million in September 2018, noted as the highest price achieved for a work by Luna at a Philippine auction and the second highest price recorded globally. In 2019, La Pintura (c. 1890s) by Félix Resurrección Hidalgo sold for ₱78,256,000, surpassing the previous world record for a Hidalgo painting of ₱51,600,122 in 2018.

== Auctions ==
Salcedo Auctions organizes several recurring sales annually, catering to different sectors of the Philippine art and collectibles market. Its flagship auction, The Well-Appointed Life, is held biannually in March and September and features significant works of Philippine fine art, antiques, and rare collectibles. The company also holds Finer Pursuits: Important Philippine Art and Rare Collectibles, a mid-year auction highlighting landmark works of Philippine art and prominent estates. Every December, Under the Tree: The Wish List presents Philippine fine art, jewelry, watches, and rare collectibles in a holiday-themed sale. In addition to these events, Salcedo Auctions also launched Gavel&Block, a subsidiary platform dedicated to contemporary, emerging, and crossover works.

== Notable sales ==
The auction house has recorded benchmark results for works involving Filipino artists. Among its notable sales are:

- Spoliarium (boceto), Juan Luna – sold for ₱63 million in September 2018; the highest price for a work by Luna at a Philippine auction and the second highest recorded globally.
- La Pintura (c.1890s), oil on canvas, Félix Resurrección Hidalgo - sold for ₱78 million in September 2019; the highest price for a work by Hidalgo.
- Untitled (1976), oil on canvas, Anita Magsaysay-Ho - sold for ₱40 million on September 16, 2023; a benchmark price for the artist at Salcedo.
- Women Fishing (1971), mixed media on board, Anita Magsaysay-Ho - sold for ₱26 million on June 25, 2022. Its reportedly the highest sale for a work of Magsaysay-Ho at the time.
- La Muerte de Cleopatra (boceto), Juan Luna - sold for ₱9 million on March 10, 2019
- Flight (1962), oil on canvas, Jose Joya - sold for ₱37 million on June 14, 2025; establishing a new size-based record for the artist at auction.
- Erenos (1959), oil on canvas, Fernando Zobel - sold for ₱28 million on June 14, 2025, establishing a new record for Zobel's Saeta series on auction.
- Untitled (2000), oil on canvas, Mauro Malang Santos - sold for ₱1.5 million in January 2020, noted as the highest price by the artist of this size (12x10 inches).
- Aesop after Velasquez (c. 1880s), oil on canvas, Juan Luna, sold for ₱17.5 million on March 7, 2014, setting a benchmark price for the artist for that year.
- Gareng Dalam Dua Gaya II (1997), mixed media, Pacita Abad, sold for ₱2.8 million in June 2025.
- Subway Madonna (1970), pen, ink, and acrylic on paper mounted on board, BenCab, sold for ₱11 million in 2023; exceeding its estimated value of ₱2.4–₱3 million. The artwork was formerly part of the collection of British actress Glenda Jackson.

== See also ==
- Philippine art
- National Artists of the Philippines
- Auction houses
- Contemporary Art
