= La Madrileña (En el Balcón) =

Painting by Juan Luna

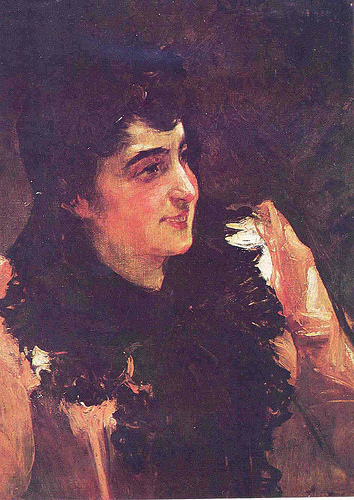
- Artist: Juan Luna
- Year: circa 1880s

La Madrileña (En el Balcón) (literally "The Woman from Madrid (At the Balcony)"), sometimes simply referred to as La Madrileña, is a painting by award-winning Filipino painter and revolutionary activist Juan Luna. It depicts a woman holding an umbrella known as the parasol. La Madrileña (En el Balcón) is one of the paintings that illustrate Luna's inclination of making women an artistic theme, showing the artist's talent as an enthusiastic painter and observer of the fairer sex. La Madrileña (En el Balcón) is one of the few existing finished paintings that are regarded by art experts as a "legacy" from Luna.

== Description ==
La Madrileña (En el Balcón) 's theme is similar to Félix Resurrección Hidalgo's La Parisienne, both are about a woman carrying an umbrella. The similarity in the theme of the two paintings made them highlights for Sotheby's auction sale in Singapore in April 2006. Apart from the thematic similarity, before being auctioned at the Sotheby's auction house, Luna's La Madrileña (En el Balcón) was also one of two rare paintings created by famous Filipino artists that have not been viewed for a century by the public. The other one was Hidalgo's La Parisienne.

Luna's La Madrileña (En el Balcón) was described to be the artist's competitive reply to Hidalgo's La Parisienne, stating that Luna wanted to create a better portrait of a woman holding an umbrella but employing a "less attractive model" and "in a more animated style", making a contrast to Hidalgo's. Luna used broad brushstrokes and played with dark and light coloration for the La Madrileña (En el Balcón), while Hidalgo used the impressionist style and a "light palette" for his La Parisienne.
