= La Laguna Estigia =

1887 painting by Félix Resurrección Hidalgo

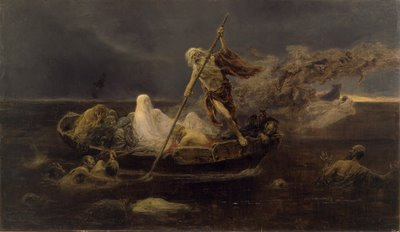
- Artist: Félix Resurrección Hidalgo
- Year: 1887

La Laguna Estigia (The River Styx or The Styx), also known simply as Laguna Estigia, is an 1887 Greco-Roman painting by Filipino painter Félix Resurrección Hidalgo. It is a companion-piece for Hidalgo's other painting entitled La barca de Aqueronte. Like the La barca de Aqueronte, the La Laguna Estigia on Dante's Inferno, the painter pursuing the theme leading towards a “darker” and “more somber interpretation” of it.

The painting was a silver medalist during the 1887 Exposicion General de las Islas Filipinas in Madrid, Spain.
