= España y Filipinas =

Series of oil paintings by Juan Luna

- España y Filipinas (Spanish)
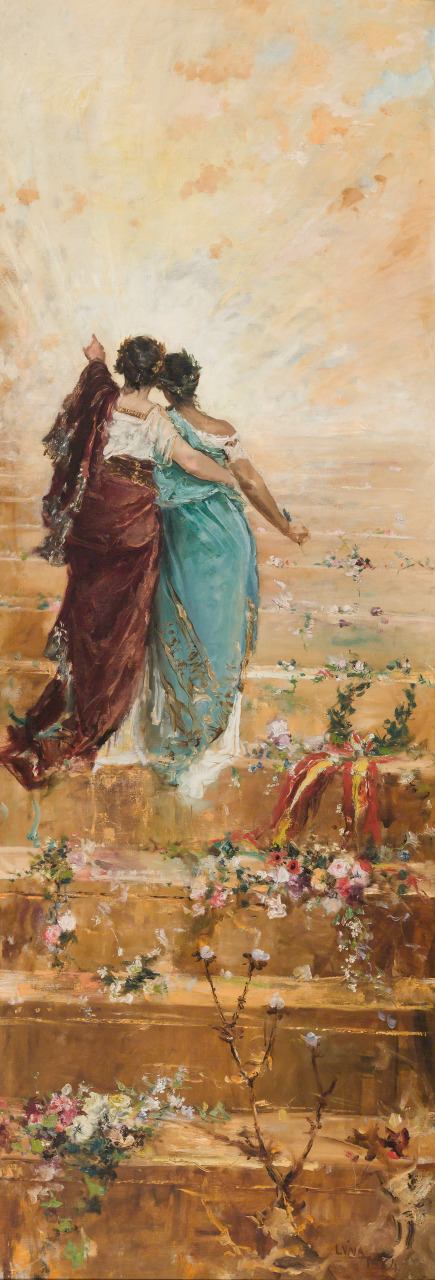
- Artist: Juan Luna
- Year: 1884
- Medium: Oil on canvas
- Dimensions: 229.5 cm × 79.5 cm (90.4 in × 31.3 in)
- Location: National Gallery Singapore

España y Filipinas (“Spain and the Philippines") is a series of oil on canvas paintings by Filipino painter, Ilustrado, and revolutionary activist, Juan Luna. It is an allegorical depiction of two women together, one a representation of Spain and the other of the Philippines. The painting, also known as España llevando a la gloria a Filipinas ("Spain Insuring the Glory of the Philippines") or España Guiando a Filipinas ("Spain Leading the Philippines"), is regarded as one of the “enduring pieces of legacy” that the Filipinos inherited from Luna.

== Description ==
The Spaniard woman “Motherland" was drawn with “wide strong shoulders” while the Filipino woman was illustrated as “graceful” and brown-skinned. Both were wearing female dresses known as traje de mestiza or "dress of the mestiza". The dressing of the women in traje de mestizas shows the cultural character, class consciousness, and social transformations resulting from 19th century Hispanization. Both women have their backs to the viewer, heading towards a far-away horizon, while embarking on the steps of a staircase. Side by side in the painting, Spain was shown to be leading the Philippines along the path to progress and development.

The taller and maternal white figure of a woman is Spain, a representation of the "benevolent image of colonialism", is pointing ahead and guiding the "humbly dressed" Filipina to the "right way". The painting appeared in the book entitled El legado de España a Filipinas or "the Spanish legacy in the Philippines" with the accompanying caption stating: España guiando a Filipinas por la senda del progreso (“Spain leads the Philippines on their way to progress”). It is further described as a painting that once linked the colonized with its former colonists, a "bucolic allegory" of the master and the servant "walking hand in hand".

== Historical significance ==
Through the projection of a close bond between Spain and the Philippines through feminine figures, this propaganda painting revealed the hope and desire of Filipino propagandists during the 19th-century: assimilation with Spain, reform, equality, modernization, and economic improvement.

== Paintings ==
Luna reportedly painted six versions of España y Filipinas, though overall compositions are largely similar. Of the six versions made, only three have been presently located.

The earliest version was painted in 1884 and is part of the permanent collection of the National Gallery Singapore. The work was commissioned by the Filipino politician Pedro Paterno, a known friend and patron of Luna. It was subsequently publicly exhibited at the 1893 Exposición Histórico-Natural y Etnográfica at the National Archaeological Museum in Madrid.

Afterwards, the painting eventually ended up in the possession of Don José Vázquez Castiñeira, a former mayor of Sarria, a municipality in the province of Lugo in Spain for nearly 130 years. It is speculated that when Paterno became the new Director of the Museo-Biblioteca de Filipinas, the paintings were either sold or given to Vázquez Castiñeiras. Interestingly, Paterno was married to María Luisa Piñeiro de Paterno, who hailed from Galicia, the same region as Vázquez Castiñeiras. In 1996, María Núñez Rodríguez, a widow without children and the late spouse of Don Francisco Vázquez Gayoso and descendant of José Vázquez Castiñeira, gathered her relatives to her residence in order to distribute her estate. Among the assets included in her estate were various Philippine artworks, such as the 1884 iteration of España y Filipinas, a study of the Spoliarium, La Pintura by Luna's contemporary Félix Resurrección Hidalgo, and other notable Philippine artworks.

Eventually, the painting later sold in 2012 at the Barcelona-based auction Balclis was eventually sold to a private Philippine art dealer. In 2013, the 1884 version of España y Filipinas was subsequently sold for a world record price of HK$25.88 million (US$2.693 million) at a Sotheby's auction sale in Hong Kong, becoming the most expensive work of Philippine art ever sold at auction.

The second version, the largest of the series, was painted in 1888 and is part of the collection of the Museo del Prado in Madrid, with the piece being loaned on a long-term basis to the City Council of Cádiz. The commission for this artwork came from Víctor Balaguer i Cirera, who served as the Minister of Overseas in Spain. Impressed by the initial version created for Paterno, Balaguer requested a more detailed rendition from Luna. The purpose of this elaborate painting was to promote closer ties between Spain and the Philippines, effectively serving as a propaganda tool.

The third version of the painting, created between 1888 and 1893, is a smaller rendition of the second version. It currently resides in the esteemed collection of the López Museum and Library in Manila. Originally commissioned for Balaguer's post-retirement period, the artwork found its way to the Biblioteca Museu Víctor Balaguer before being acquired by Filipino industrialist Eugenio López Sr. for the López Museum and Library.

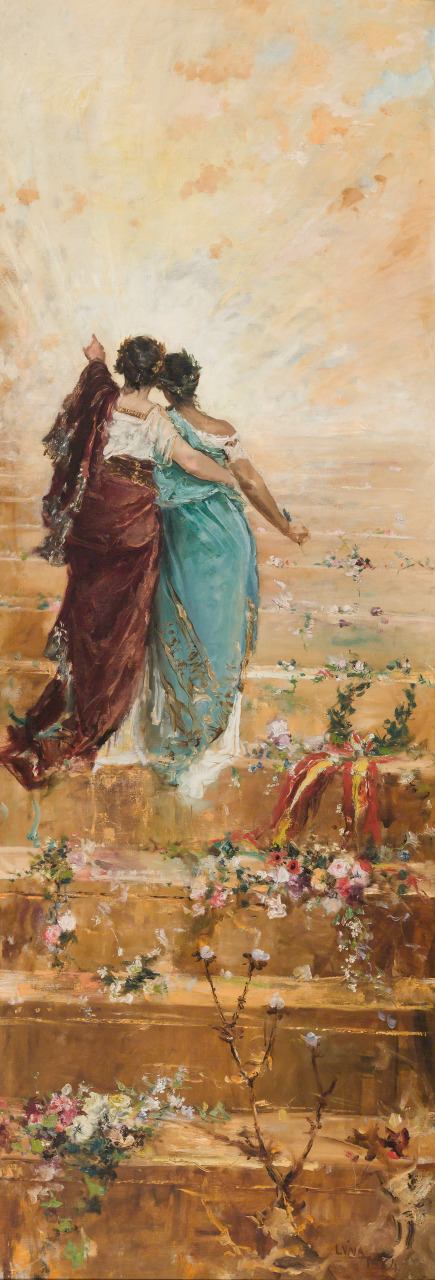
España y Filipinas, Oil on canvas, 229.5 × 77.5 cm, National Gallery Singapore, Singapore

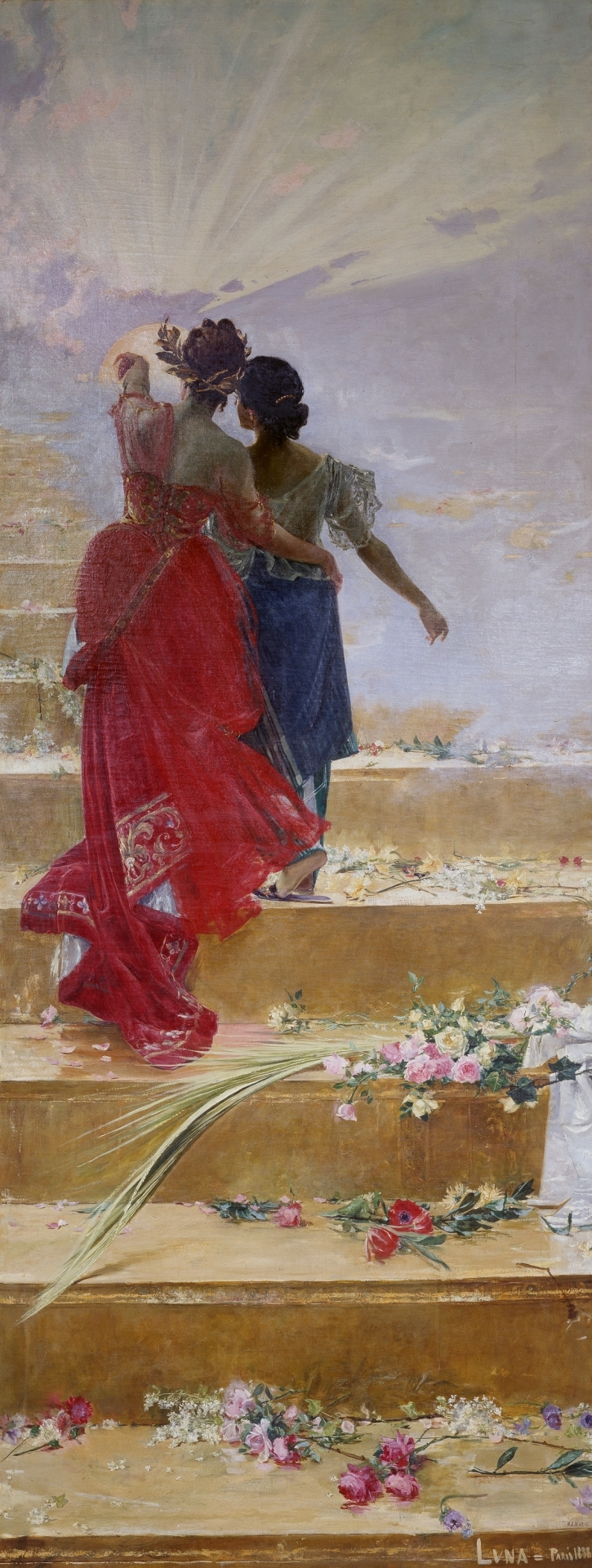
España llevando a la gloria a Filipinas 1888, Oil on canvas, 442 x 167 cm, Museo del Prado, on loan to the City Council of Cádiz.

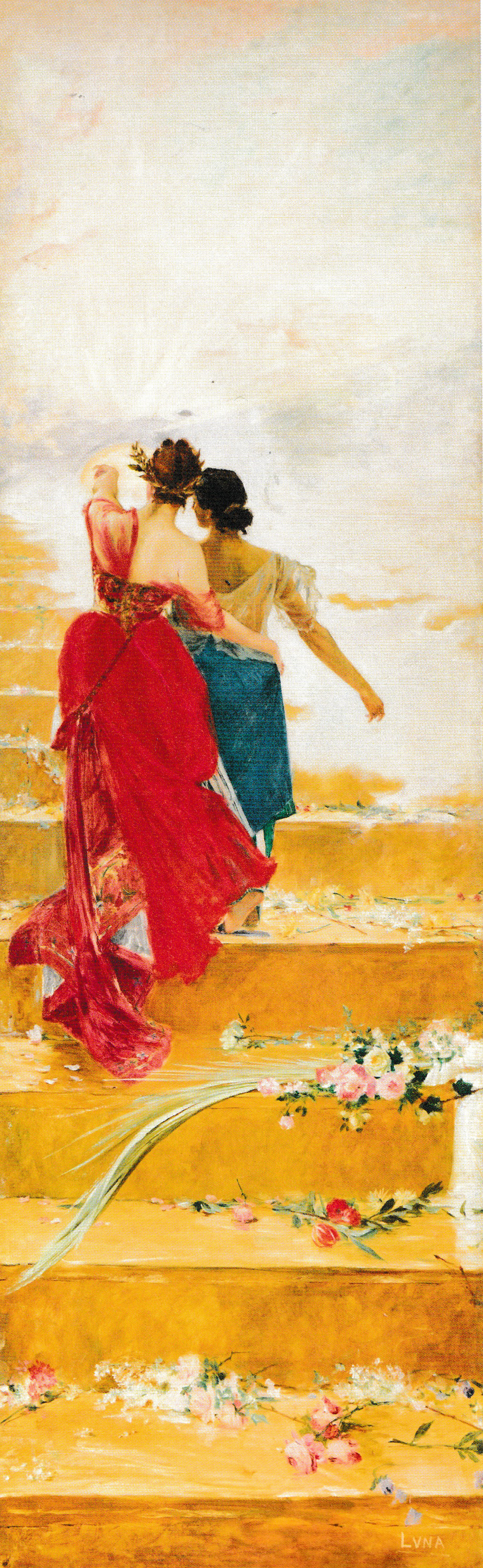
España Guiando a Filipinas circa 1888-1893, Oil on canvas, 249.3 × 79.5 cm, López Museum and Library, Manila

== See also ==
- Spoliarium
- Las Damas Romanas
- The Death of Cleopatra
- The Blood Compact
