= Las Damas Romanas =

1882 painting by Juan Luna

The Roman Maidens
- Las Damas Romanas (Spanish)
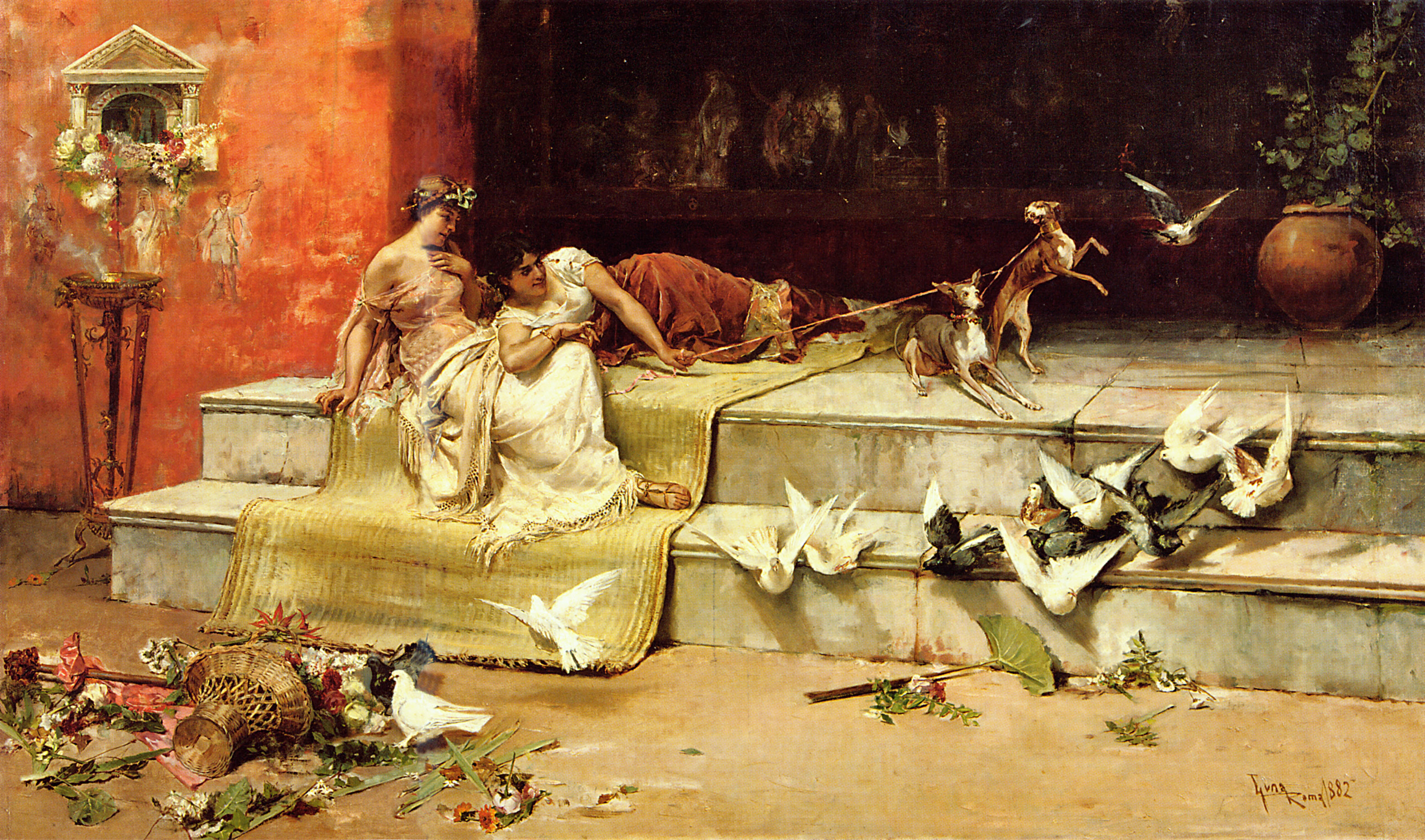
- Artist: Juan Luna
- Year: 1882
- Medium: oil on canvas
- Dimensions: 100 cm × 170 cm (39 in × 67 in)
- Location: Private Collection

Las Damas Romanas (literally, "The Roman Dames"), also known as The Roman Maidens, The Roman Women, or The Roman Ladies, is an oil on canvas painted in the style of Neo-Classicism by Juan Luna, one of the most famous Filipino painters of the Spanish period in the Philippines. It was painted by Luna when he was a student of the school of painting in the Real Academia de Bellas Artes de San Fernando (Royal Academy of Fine Arts of San Fernando) in Madrid, Spain in 1877. Alejo Valera, a Spanish painting teacher, took Luna as an apprentice and brought him to Rome where Luna created Las Damas Romanas in 1882. Skilled in the style of the academy, he was the first Filipino painter to win international recognition in Europe and the US.

Luna spent six years in Rome from 1878 to 1884.

== Historical overview ==
Las Damas Romanas is one of the early works of Luna as a painter that resurfaced in the past quarter of a century after being presumed to be either lost or missing. Before its reappearance in Paris many years before 2008, it had been documented only as a title and as a listed work of Luna in the 1957 biography of Luna written by Carlos E. Da Silva. The painting had also been documented through a black and white photograph from the files of Alfonso T. Ongpin, a historian and pre-war art dealer. In 1980, the image from Ongpin was reprinted by Santiago Pilar in the book "Juan Luna: The Filipino As Painter".

== Description ==
The concept for the 100 cm x 170 cm size painting was based by Luna on ancient Roman history. It depicted a domestic scene in ancient Roman life, portraying two women lying on the steps of a house. The hand of one woman was holding the reins of two pet dogs or hunting dogs, in order to prevent them from scaring away some doves. The doves symbolized divinity The background of the painting presented a shelf of artifacts. To the left of the shelf was a shrine with a pediment shaped like a triangle. In front of the pediment was a burner with a smoking incense.

There are three major elements of Las Damas Romanas, namely the women, the dogs, and the doves. Roman life involved having dogs because they were employed by the ancient Romans for hunting activities, guardians of the home and their property, and as pets. In Luna's painting, the leashed pet dogs were acting as companions of women. Doves, on the other hand, were animals that connote eroticism. In relation to one of the women, there was a suggestion that the woman on the right with dark hair could be Maria de la Paz Pardo de Tavera. The notion was discarded because Luna was unmarried when he painted Las Damas Romanas.

Luna finished Las Damas Romanas after winning a silver medal for The Death of Cleopatra painting in 1881 and before obtaining a gold medal for the masterpiece Spoliarium in 1884 (both were presented during the Madrid Exposition during the years mentioned). In 1886, Luna was awarded a Diploma of Honor at the Munich Art Exposition (also known as the Munich Salon) for painting Las Damas Romanas. The masterpiece was a classic work painted in the highest conventions of the academic style, and it was a representative of the "abundant richness of life, with humankind", represented by women in the painting, being "in harmony with Nature".

== Valuation ==
Long thought lost or missing, the painting emerged in an estate sale outside Paris, France, before 2008. During this art auction, the painting was originally priced between 10,000 and 20,000 euros (₱623,000 and ₱1.3 million), a range that rose to greater than 200,000 euros (₱12.4 million) when the painting was bought by a French art dealer. The painting was auctioned once again on November 30, 2008, at Christie's in Hong Kong with an estimated value ranging from $1 million to $1.2 million, the equivalent of HK$8,000,000 to HK$10,000,000. The work sold for far less than the estimate, however, achieving $609,193, or HK$4,700,000, including buyer's premium.

== See also ==
- España y Filipinas
- The Blood Compact
