= La Pintura =

Painting by Félix Resurrección Hidalgo

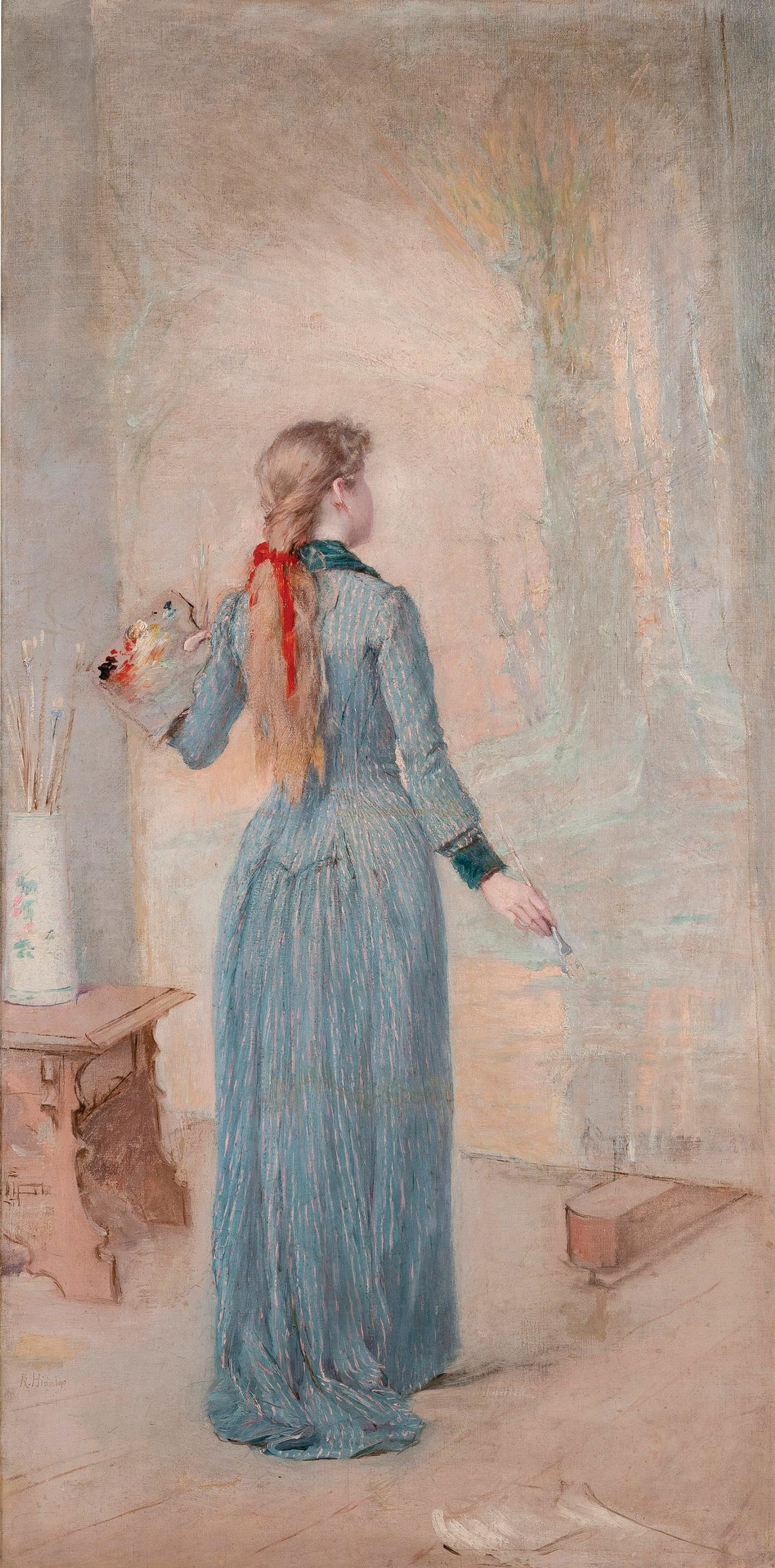
- Artist: Félix Resurrección Hidalgo
- Year: c. 1890s
- Medium: Oil on canvas
- Dimensions: 150 cm × 75 cm (59 in × 30 in)
- Location: Private Collection, Philippines

The La Pintura is a painting by the Filipino artist Félix Resurrección Hidalgo done in the style of Impressionism. The painting depicts a woman holding an paintbrush while turning back to the viewer, as she gazes towards an unfinished canvas. Hidalgo's La Pintura was subsequently sold for a world record of the artist of PHP78.256 million (US$1.51 million) at a Salcedo Auctions' Important Philippine Art sale in the Philippines on September 21, 2019.

== Description ==
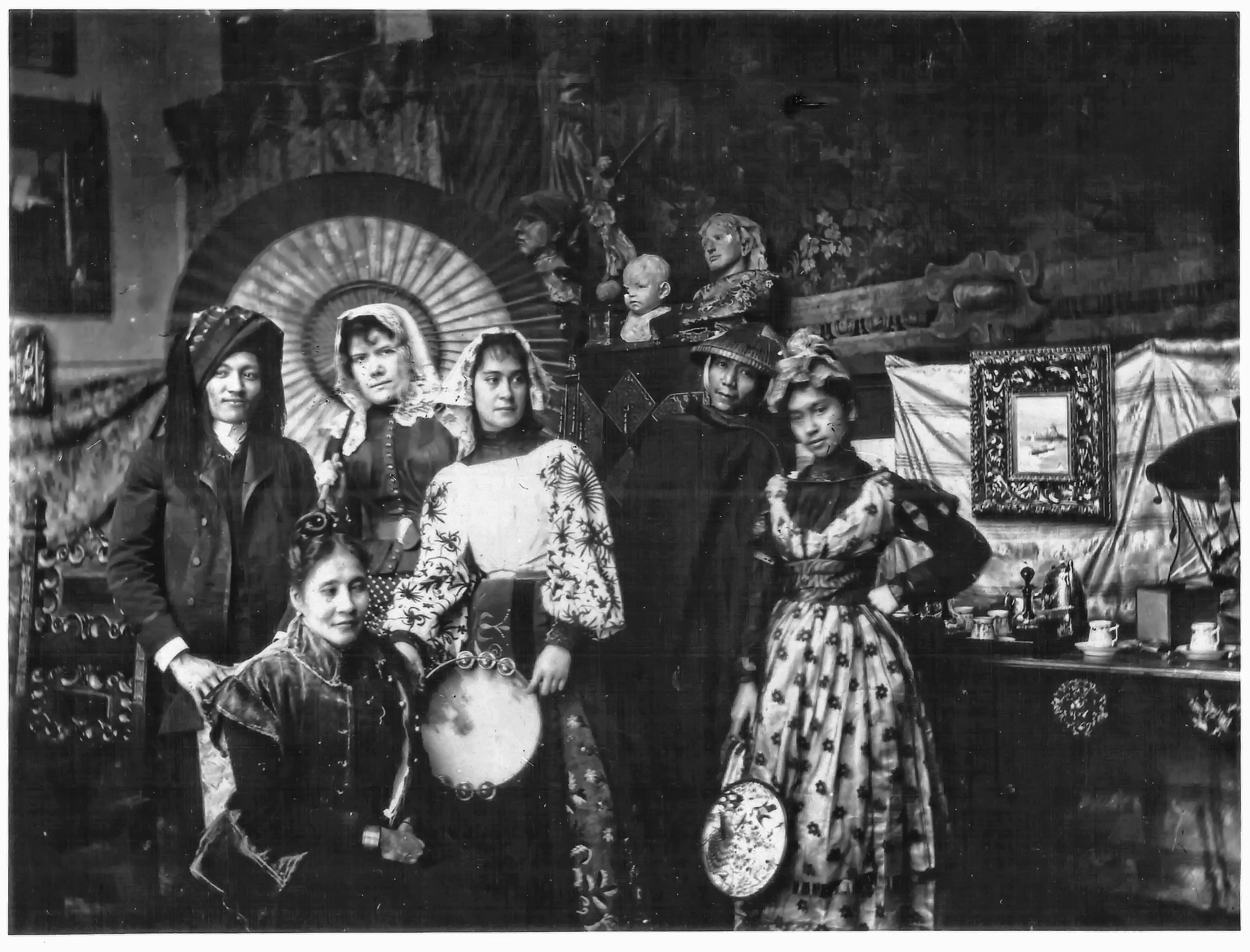
Hidalgo with members of the Pardo de Tavera family including José Rizal and Juan Luna's wife Paz Pardo de Tavera at Luna's studio in Paris.

The La Pintura was created by Hidalgo in the impressionist style inspired by the trend of Japonisme, as the collecting and display of ukiyo-e prints was gaining significant traction among Western art circles. Beginning in the 1890s, Hidalgo began veering away from the historical realism style that brought his work towards international recognition, as denoted with his award-winning composition Las Virgenes Cristianas Expuestas al Populacho (1884) that garnered him a silver medal, along with that of compatriot and his personal friend Juan Luna who won his first gold medal (out of three) for Spoliarium at the 1884 Exposicion General de Bellas Artes in Madrid.

The identity of the female painter depicted in the work has not been fully determined by scholars, previously attributing the sitter to Maria Yrritia who was Hidalgo's muse and common-law wife until his death in 1913.

One plausible conclusion is that the model for the artwork was Nellie Boustead, one of the former lovers of the Philippine nationalist José Rizal. Boustead was one of the daughters of Eduardo Boustead, the illegitimate son of Edward Boustead, a wealthy British trader, and his Filipina partner who had residences in Biarritz and Paris. She became famously embroiled in a love triangle between her, Rizal, and fellow propagandist (later military general) Antonio Luna that almost led to a duel between the two.

== Return to the Philippines ==
La Pintura was publicly exhibited at the 1893 Exposición Histórico-Natural y Etnográfica at the National Archaeological Museum in Madrid. Further research reveals that the work's provenance traces the painting being part of the collection of the Philippine politician Pedro Paterno, who was a known friend and patron of Hidalgo. Segismundo Moret, who then served as the Minister of Overseas tasked that Paterno to provide pieces for the Philippine component of the Madrid exposition at the last minute.

It is not clear what became of the painting after the exhibition before being in the ownership of Don Jose Vazquez Castiñeira, a former mayor of Sarria, a municipality in the province of Lugo in Spain for nearly 130 years. One can surmise upon Paterno having been appointed as the new Director of the Museo-Biblioteca de Filipinas, the paintings were later sold or given to the Vazquez Castiñeiras. Paterno was married to Maria Luisa Piñeiro de Paterno who originated from Galicia, the same area were Vazquez Castiñeiras hailed from. This Galician connection between Paterno and the Vazquez Castiñeiras was further revealed prior to the sale of the Boceto for Spoliarium by Juan Luna in 2018.

In 1996, Maria Nuñez Rodriguez, a childless widow of Don Francisco Vazquez Gayoso summoned her relatives into her household to be able to divide her estate. Included in the said estate were Philippine works of art that included an earlier version of España y Filipinas (1884) by Luna, the Spoliarium study, the Hidalgo painting, and other Philippine works of art. One side of the heirs of Nuñez Rodriguez subsequently sold the version España y Filipinas at a 2012 Balclis auction sale in Barcelona to an anonymous Philippine art dealer. It was subsequently purchased by the National Gallery Singapore at the 40th-anniversary sale of the Sotheby’s Hong Kong branch in 2013 for PHP156.52 million (HKD$25.88 million), a world record price for a work of art by Juan Luna.

In 2019, La Pintura was subsequently sold for a world record price of PHP78.256 million (US$1.51 million) at a Salcedo Auctions' Important Philippine Art sale in the Philippines. The sale beat the previous record held by an earlier work by Hidlago from his Philippine period Pareja de jóvenes tagalos ante un rio (1879) that sold for PHP51.60 million (US$957,863.78) at Subastas Segre sale in Spain.

== Sources ==
- Breve noticia de la Exposición Histórico-Natural y Etnográfica de Madrid. Madrid, Spain: Establecimiento Tipográfico Sucesores de Rivadeneyra. 1893.
- Storer, Russel; Chikiamco, Clarissa; Hafiz, Syed Muhammad (2017). Between Worlds: Raden Saleh and Juan Luna. Singapore: National Gallery Singapore. ISBN 9789811146848.
- Lerma, Ramon E.S. (2019). Félix Resurrección Hidalgo: La Pintura. Makati City, Philippines: Salcedo Auctions.
- Lerma, Ramon E.S. (2018). Juan Luna y Novicio: Boceto for 'Spoliarium'. Makati City, Philippines: Salcedo Auctions.
- Lerma, Ramon E.S. (2019). Juan Luna y Novicio & Félix Resurrección Hidalgo: Revelations. Makati City, Philippines: Salcedo Auctions.
- Roces, Alfredo (1995). Félix Resurrección Hidalgo & The Generation of 1872. Pasig City, Philippines: Eugenio Lopez Foundation, Inc. ISBN 971-1005-32-8.
