= The Death of Cleopatra (Juan Luna) =

1881 painting by Juan Luna

- La muerte de Cleopatra (Spanish)
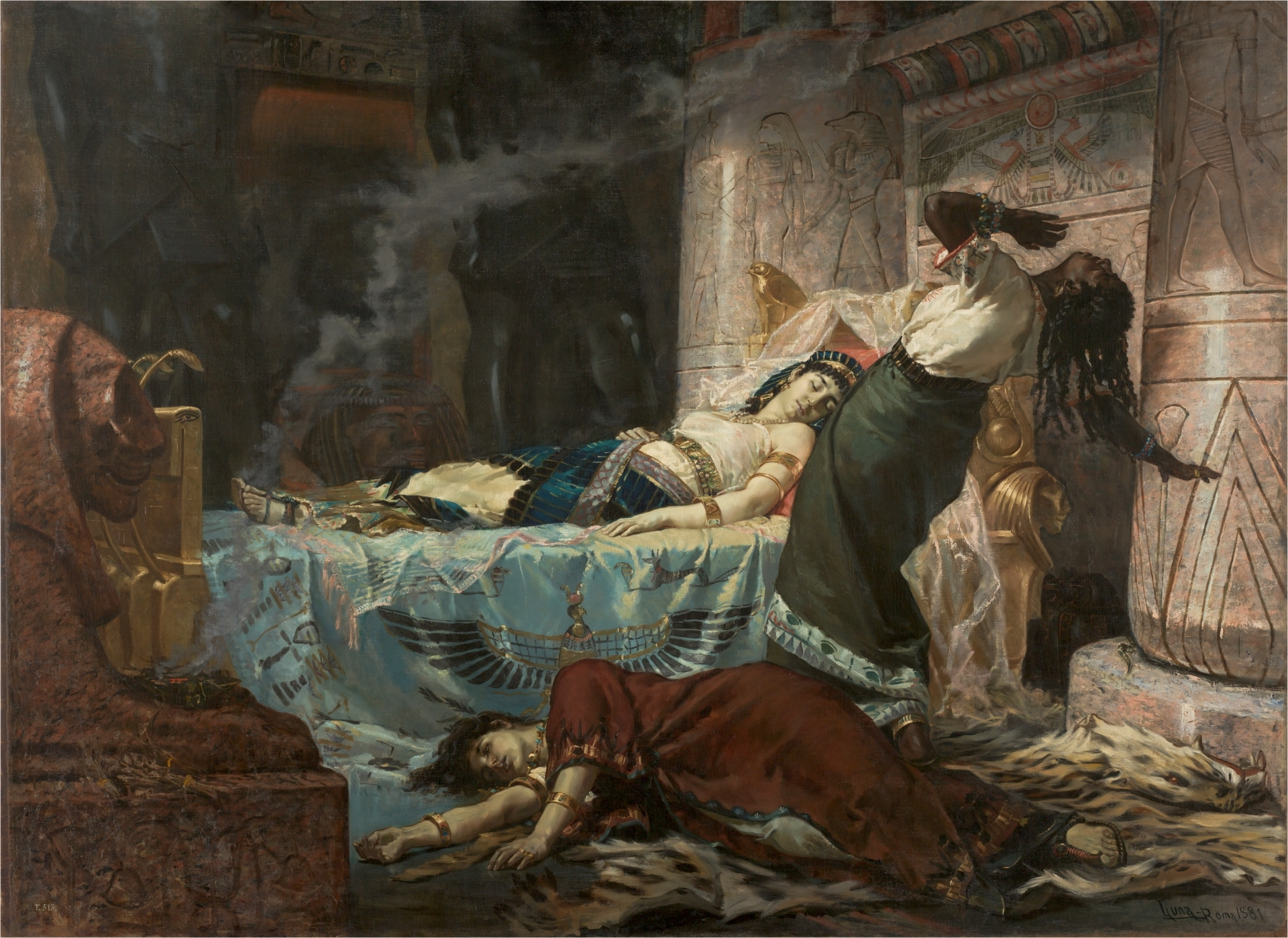
- Artist: Juan Luna
- Year: 1881
- Medium: Oil on canvas
- Dimensions: 250 cm × 340 cm (98.4 in × 132 in)
- Location: Museo del Prado, Madrid

The Death of Cleopatra (Spanish: La muerte de Cleopatra), also known simply as Cleopatra, is an 1881 oil painting on canvas by the Filipino painter Juan Luna, currently on display at the Museo del Prado in Madrid, Spain. Depicting the death of Cleopatra, the last active ruler of ancient Egypt, the painting was painted during Luna's stay in Rome, and later won a silver medal during the 1881 National Exposition of Fine Arts in Madrid, which was also his first art exposition.

The painting, one of only three pieces by Filipino artists on permanent display at the Prado, is notable both for its composition and its history. Painted during a time of increased national consciousness, The Death of Cleopatra not only served as a representation of a colonized people standing up against their colonizer, but also brought to attention the ability of Filipino artists, and particularly Luna himself, to surpass their European contemporaries.

== Description ==
The Death of Cleopatra depicts Cleopatra moments after her death, with Luna taking inspiration for the painting's composition from Plutarch's account of her life in his Parallel Lives series. Her corpse is found at the center of the painting, lying on a bed adorned with a golden headboard and covered with rich bedsheets, with the sheets themselves decorated with hieroglyphs and the footboard similarly adorned in gold. Cleopatra herself is bejeweled and dressed in a manner befitting that of an Egyptian queen, and smoke coming from a nearby lamp, said to contain incense, hovering above her body signifies that she had died, giving the piece a mysterious aura. While Cleopatra is clothed, the cloth above her belt and around her breasts is transparent, playing into the popular concept of an "eroticized" Cleopatra that is common in other works of the era depicting her death.

Two servants in various states of collapse are also present in the painting, with the first, Iras, already dead by Cleopatra's feet. The second, the dark-skinned Charmion, is seen falling after she adjusts Cleopatra's diadem, dying shortly thereafter. Meanwhile, the asp that reportedly caused Cleopatra's death is seen by the foot of one of the room's columns, barely visible as it slithers away.

The setting for The Death of Cleopatra is funerary in nature, indicated by the various decorations in the room such as the sphinx by the footboard, canopic jars by the headboard, the lamp and even the columns decorated with hieroglyphs. A statue of Anubis is also present in the background, foreshadowing what was to come.

== History ==
Luna first began work on The Death of Cleopatra in his then-studio on Via Margutta in Rome, where he had lived since moving to the city in 1878 with his master, Alejo Vera. A study (boceto) for what would become the final painting was created in 1880, modeled on an 1874 painting of the death of Cleopatra by the French painter Jean-André Rixens. Unlike the final piece, the boceto was sold for ₱9.3 million at an auction by Salcedo Auctions in March 2019.

Because of the exposure, Luna received a pension scholarship from the Ayuntamiento de Manila. After the painting competition, Luna sold it for 5,000 Spanish pesetas, the highest price for a painting at the time. As Luna's "graduation work", The Death of Cleopatra was acquired by the Spanish government for one thousand duros.

After its last appearance in 1887, the painting was again shown to the public 130 years later in 2017 at the National Gallery Singapore.

== See also ==
- Spoliarium
- España y Filipinas
- Las Damas Romanas
- The Blood Compact
