= Ensueños de Amor =

Painting by Juan Luna

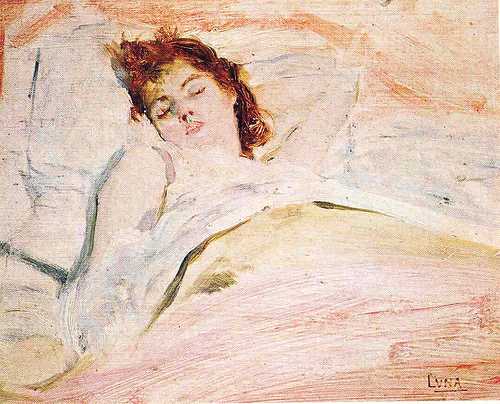
- Artist: Juan Luna
- Year: circa 1890s
- Dimensions: 26.7 cm × 32.4 cm (10 1/2 in × 12 3/4 in)
- Location: Lopez Museum

Ensueños de Amor, literally "Daydreams of Love", is a "dreamy" oil on wood painting by Filipino painter and revolutionary activist Juan Luna. It depicts Luna's wife Paz Pardo de Tavera while sound asleep. It is currently a part of the art collection of the Lopez Museum.

Measuring 10 1/2 by 12 3/4 inches (270 mm × 320 mm), it is a contrapposto beneath the cover of bed sheets. The predominant color used by Luna for Ensueños de Amor is white with dashes of pink, green, and blue hues. Luna used rapid brush strokes to express the dreamy mood.

The idealism of this painting masks a darker fact in real life, for although Luna was fond of his wife, he was unfortunately also prone to fits of violent jealousy. On September 23, 1892, after accusing her of adultery, he killed his wife and mother-in-law as well as seriously wounding his brother-in-law. Luna was charged with murder but was acquitted shortly thereafter, his deed judged as a crime of passion.
