= Las Virgenes Cristianas Expuestas al Populacho =

1884 painting by Félix Resurrección Hidalgo

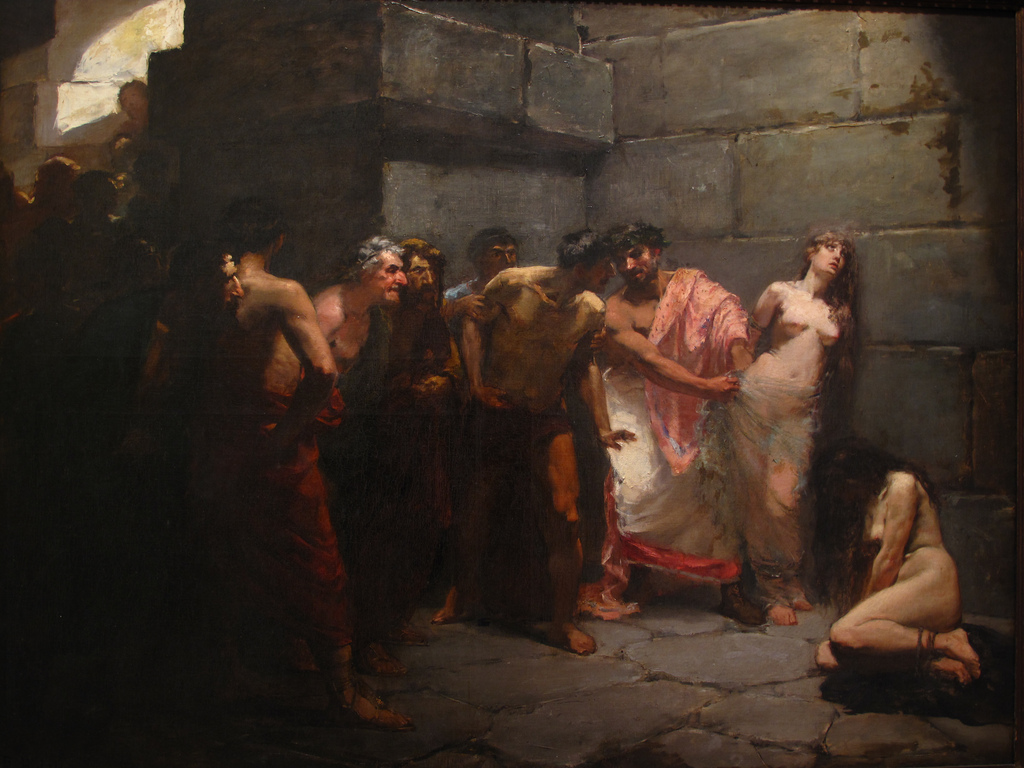
- Artist: Félix Resurrección Hidalgo
- Year: 1884
- Medium: Oil on canvas
- Dimensions: 115 cm × 157 cm (45 in × 62 in)
- Location: Bangko Sentral ng Pilipinas Collection

Las Virgenes Cristianas Expuestas al Populacho or The Christian Virgins Exposed to the Populace is a famous 1884 history painting by Filipino painter, reformist, and propagandist Félix Resurrección Hidalgo. The painting is alternately known as The Christian Virgins Exposed to the Rabble, Jovenes Cristianas Expuestas al Populacho (Christian Maidens Exposed to the Populace), Christian Virgins Presented to the Populace, The Christian Virgins Being Exposed to the Populace, and Christian Virgins Exposed to the Mob.

The painting was a silver medalist (ninth silver medal award among forty-five) during the 1884 Exposicion General de Bellas Artes in Madrid, Spain, also known as the Madrid Exposition. According to Raquel A.G. Reyes, Hidalgo's winning the silver medal for the painting was a landmark achievement that proved the ability of Filipinos to match the work of Spaniards and laid claim to Filipino participation in European culture.

Regarded as one of the national treasures of the Philippines, a copy of the painting is part of the art collection of the Bangko Sentral ng Pilipinas (Central Bank of the Philippines). The original was destroyed in a fire at the University of Valladolid in Spain. From 2015 until 2020, the painting was on a five-year loan to National Gallery Singapore as part of its Southeast Asian art galleries.

== Description ==
An oil on canvas painting measuring 1.15 m × 1.57 m (45 in × 62 in), Las Virgenes Cristianas Expuestas al Populacho is a "landmark painting" depicting the persecution of Christians in Ancient Rome. Described as a masterpiece remarkable in the aspects of quality, composition, and historical context, it portrays two scantily clothed Christian female slaves being mocked by a group of boorish Roman male onlookers. One of the women is posed seated naked at the foreground of the painting with her "head bowed in misery". The semi-nude women have been stripped not only of their garments but also of their dignity. Created in the academic style of Europe, the unfortunate women in the artwork are considered by some indigenous Filipinos as virgins "being led out, stolen from, and ridiculed". The women are young virgins cornered by a mob of "sexually hungry" Roman men. One of the men has his hand over one semi-naked female whose eyes are "looking up to heaven" asking and begging for "help that never comes".

Together with Juan Luna's Spoliarium, Hidalgo's Las Virgenes Cristianas Expuestas al Populacho presents "human spoliage and spoils", with human spoilage more related to Luna's Spoliarium and the human spoils closer to Hidalgo's Las Virgenes Cristianas Expuestas al Populacho. Such themes were presented to the "juries and audiences" of the Madrid exposition in order to satisfy the "erudition-quotient" essential to the conservative scholarly Neoclassicism of Hidalgo and Luna while they were spending time in Europe.

== The artist ==
Hidalgo's works, together with Juan Luna's, are part of the Hall of Masters in the National Museum of Fine Arts of the National Museum of the Philippines. By winning medals at the Madrid Exposition, both Hidalgo and Juan Luna are the first "international" Filipino painters. It was regardless who won the first or the second prize because these awards were primarily "gauges of quality" of the artwork. Hidalgo is regarded as a Philippine hero for his participation in acting his role as a correspondent for the La Independencia newspaper.

== Historical background ==
After winning at the Exposition in Madrid, a small group of Filipino expatriates and members of the Philippine reform movement held a victory celebration. As a tribute to the medalists, Pedro Paterno hosted a banquet not only to honor Hidalgo and Luna but also with the purpose of making the Philippines better known among the politicians and journalists of Madrid with the help of the El Imparcial, a liberal Spanish newspaper. During the party, José Rizal gave a speech regarding the achievement of Hidalgo and Luna as a proof that the talents of Filipino artists equaled those of the Spaniards. In relation to such evidence, Rizal questioned the inequality in political rights and freedom between Filipinos and Spaniards. Graciano Lopez-Jaena in turn orated that Hidalgo and Luna were propaganda painters who exposed the "lamentable conditions" of the Philippines while under the tutelage of the Spaniards.

== Exhibitions ==
From late 2009 through March 2010, Las Virgenes Cristianas Expuestas al Populacho became a part of the Thrice Upon A Time: A Century Of Story In The Art Of The Philippines exhibit, an exposition held at the Singapore Art Museum. The show, presenting the best artworks of Filipino artists, was held in conjunction with the In The Eye Of Modernity exhibit that presented neo-realist artworks from Manila's Ateneo Art Gallery. Both exhibitions marked the 40-year anniversary of diplomatic ties between the Philippines and Singapore. President Gloria Macapagal Arroyo was present during the opening ceremony and viewing of Hidalgo's masterpiece.

From 2015 until 2020, the painting was on a five-year loan to National Gallery Singapore as part of its art galleries chronicling the progress of Southeast Asian art from the 19th century to the present through its inaugural exhibition titled Between Declaration and Dreams.

== See also ==
- La barca de Aqueronte
