= López Museum and Library =

Art museum and library in Pasig, Philippines

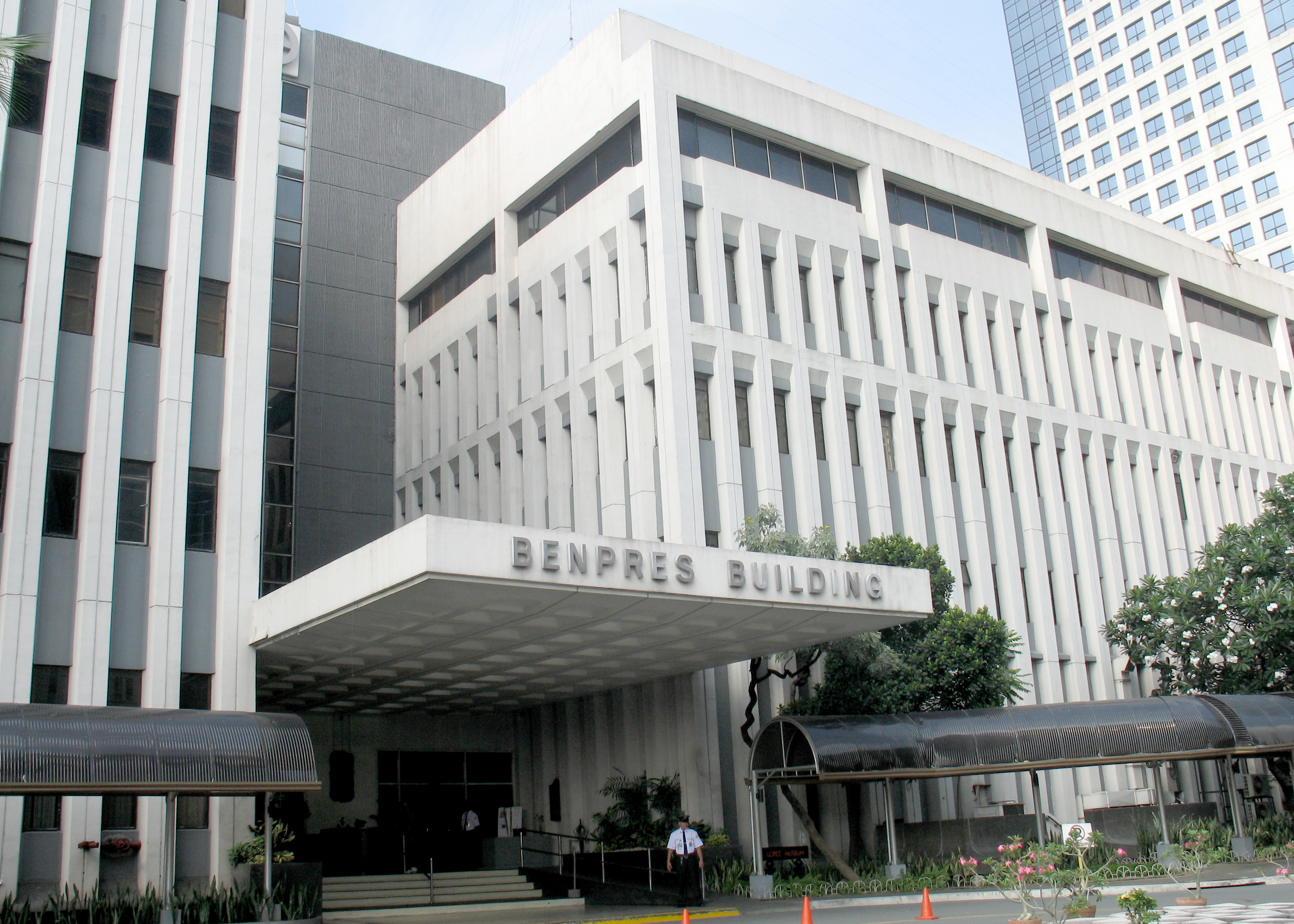
- Facade of its former location at the Benpres Building
- Former name: López Memorial Museum
- Established: February 13, 1960
- Location: Eugenio Lopez Center, Antipolo, Rizal, Philippines (Library holdings); The Proscenium, Makati City, Philippines (Art collection holdings)
- Coordinates: 14°34′57″N 121°03′46″E
- Type: Art museum and library
- Collection size: 500 artworks, 20,000 publications (2010)
- Founder: Eugenio López Sr.
- Executive director: Mercedes Lopez-Vargas
- Website: lml.org.ph

The López Museum and Library, also known as simply the Lopez Museum, is a Philippine art and history museum and library. It previously was located in Pasig, Philippines at the ground floor of the Benpres Building, Exchange Road corner Meralco Avenue, Ortigas Center.

== History ==
The López Museum and Library was on February 13, 1960, by Eugenio López Sr. It was among the first privately run museums in the Philippines and was originally housed inside a four-storey building designed by Angel Nakpil along Lancaster Street in Pasay.

Initially founded as the López Memorial Museum, the institution was originally meant to be dedicated to López's parents, Benito and Presentacion López but shifted to maintaining a collection dedicated to Filipino heritage. Under its first curator, Renato Constantino, the museum acquired the Juan Luna painting, España y Filipinas which complemented López growing collection of Filipiniana books and maps.

The López Museum moved to the Benpres Building in Pasig on April 19, 1986, with its previous building in Pasay later demolished.

In 2012, it was announced that the López Museum would be moving to a building at the Rockwell Center in Makati. However it was only in 2017, that the museum that the relocation process started. The museum was closed as part of preparations for its relocation. The museum's collection will be split in two locations: at the Eugenio Lopez Center in Antipolo, Rizal and a space at The Proscenium at Rockwell.

In May 2024, the museum announced that it would hold the first exhibition of its collections outside its premises at the University of the Philippines Visayas Main Building in Iloilo City from November 2024 until April 2026.

== Collection ==
The López Museum and Library is dedicated to housing artworks by reputed Filipino artists such as Juan Luna, and Felix Resurreccion Hidalgo, memorabilia relating to Filipino national hero Jose Rizal and Filipiniana materials and publications.
