= Spoliarium =

1884 painting by Juan Luna

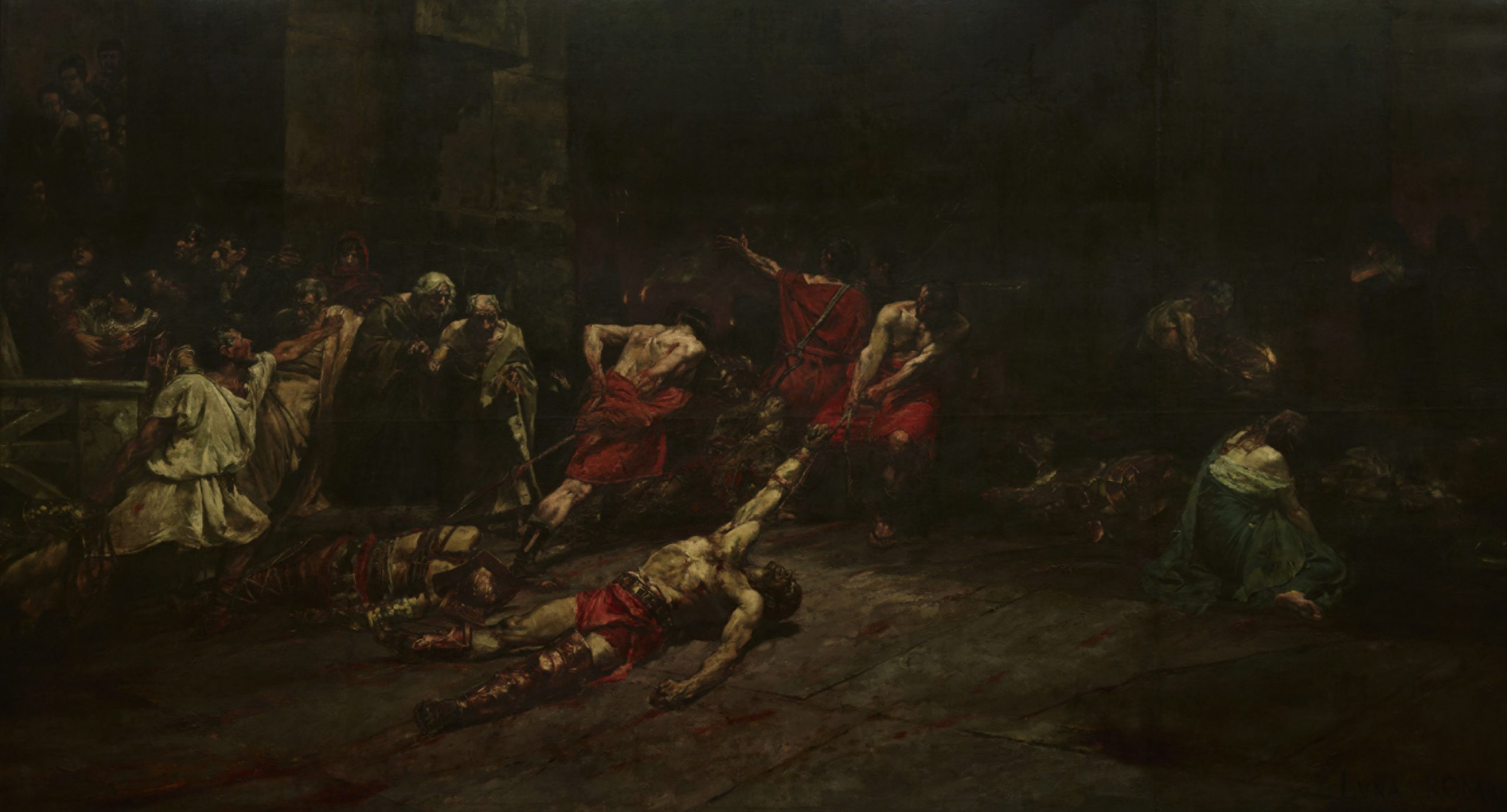
- Artist: Juan Luna
- Year: 1884
- Medium: Oil on canvas
- Dimensions: 4.22 m × 7.675 m (13.8 ft × 25.18 ft)
- Location: National Museum of Fine Arts, Manila

The Spoliarium is a painting by Filipino painter Juan Luna. Luna, working on canvas, spent eight months completing the painting which depicts dying gladiators. The painting was submitted by Luna to the Exposición Nacional de Bellas Artes in 1884 in Madrid, where it garnered the first gold medal (out of three). The picture recreates a despoiling scene in a Roman circus where dead gladiators are stripped of weapons and garments. Together with other works of the Spanish Academy, the Spoliarium was on exhibit in Rome in April 1884.

In 1886, the painting was sold to the provincial government of Barcelona for 20,000 pesetas. It is currently displayed in the main gallery at the first floor of the National Museum of Fine Arts in Manila, and is the first work of art that greets visitors upon entry into the museum. The National Museum considers it the largest painting in the Philippines with dimensions of 4.22 meters x 7.675 meters.

Filipino historian Ambeth Ocampo writes, "...the fact remains that when Luna and Félix Resurrección Hidalgo won the top awards in the Madrid Exposition of 1884, they proved to the world that indios could, despite their supposed barbarian race, paint better than the Spaniards who colonized them."

== José Rizal and the Spoliarium ==
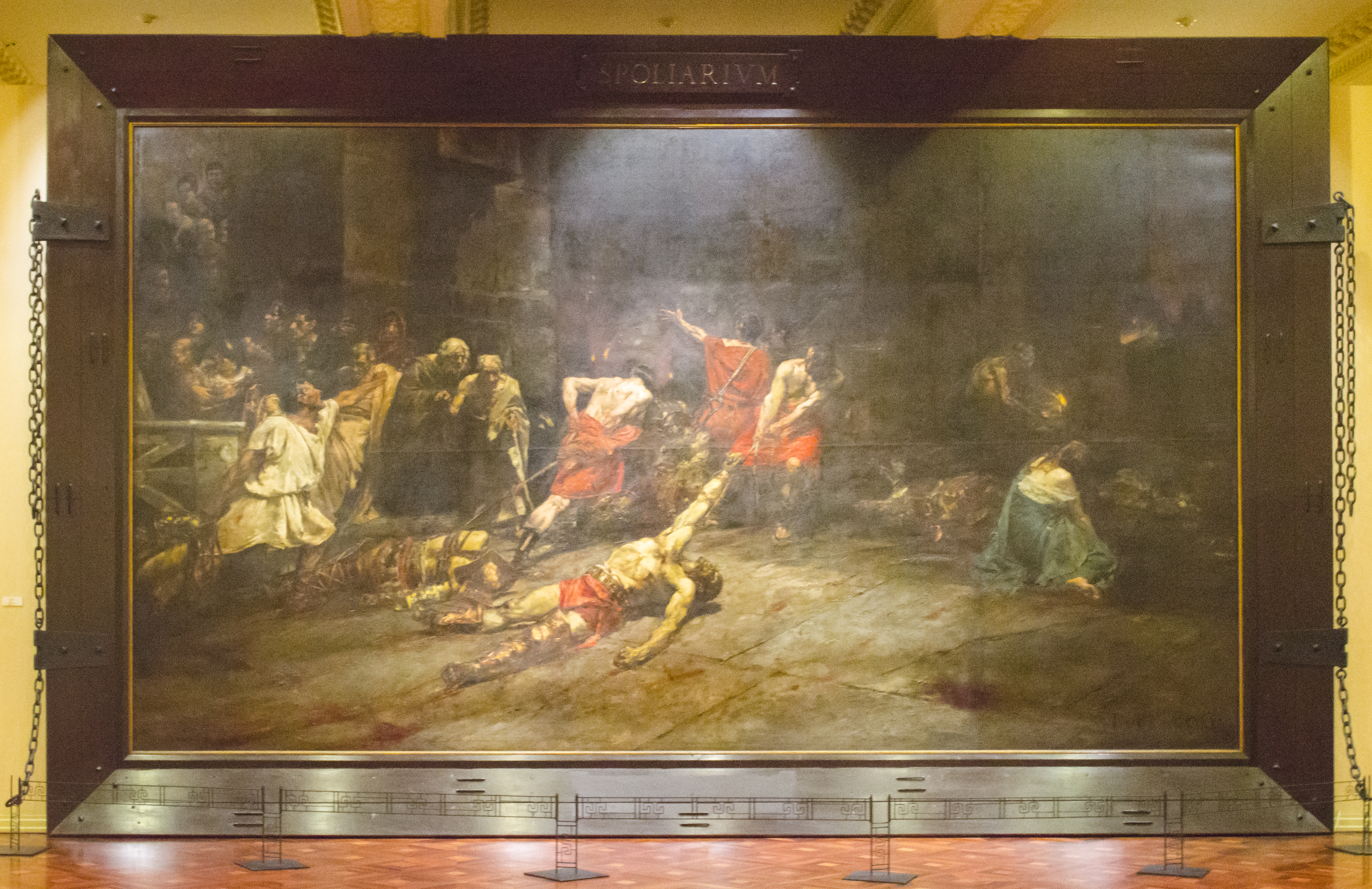
Spoliarium as displayed in the National Museum of Fine Arts in Manila.

At a gathering of Filipino expatriates in Madrid, José Rizal enthusiastically toasted the triumphs his two compatriots had achieved, the other being Félix Hidalgo who won a silver medal, calling it "fresh proof of racial equality".

"Luna's Spoliarium with its bloody carcasses of slave gladiators being dragged away from the arena where they had entertained their Roman oppressors with their lives... stripped to satisfy the lewd contempt of their Roman persecutors with their honor...." Rizal was footnoted in his speech that the Spoliarium, "embodied the essence of our social, moral and political life: humanity in severe ordeal, humanity unredeemed, reason and idealism in open struggle with prejudice, fanaticism and injustice."

Rizal was inspired to carve a mark of his own to give glory to his country by writing his 'Spoliarium' since early that year 1884 "he had been toying with the idea of a book" for he has seen and described the painting as "the tumult of the crowd, the shouts of slaves, the metallic clatter of dead men's armor, the sobs of orphans, the murmured prayers..." Rizal's book would be called Noli Me Tangere, "the Latin echo of the Spoliarium".

== Return to the Philippines ==
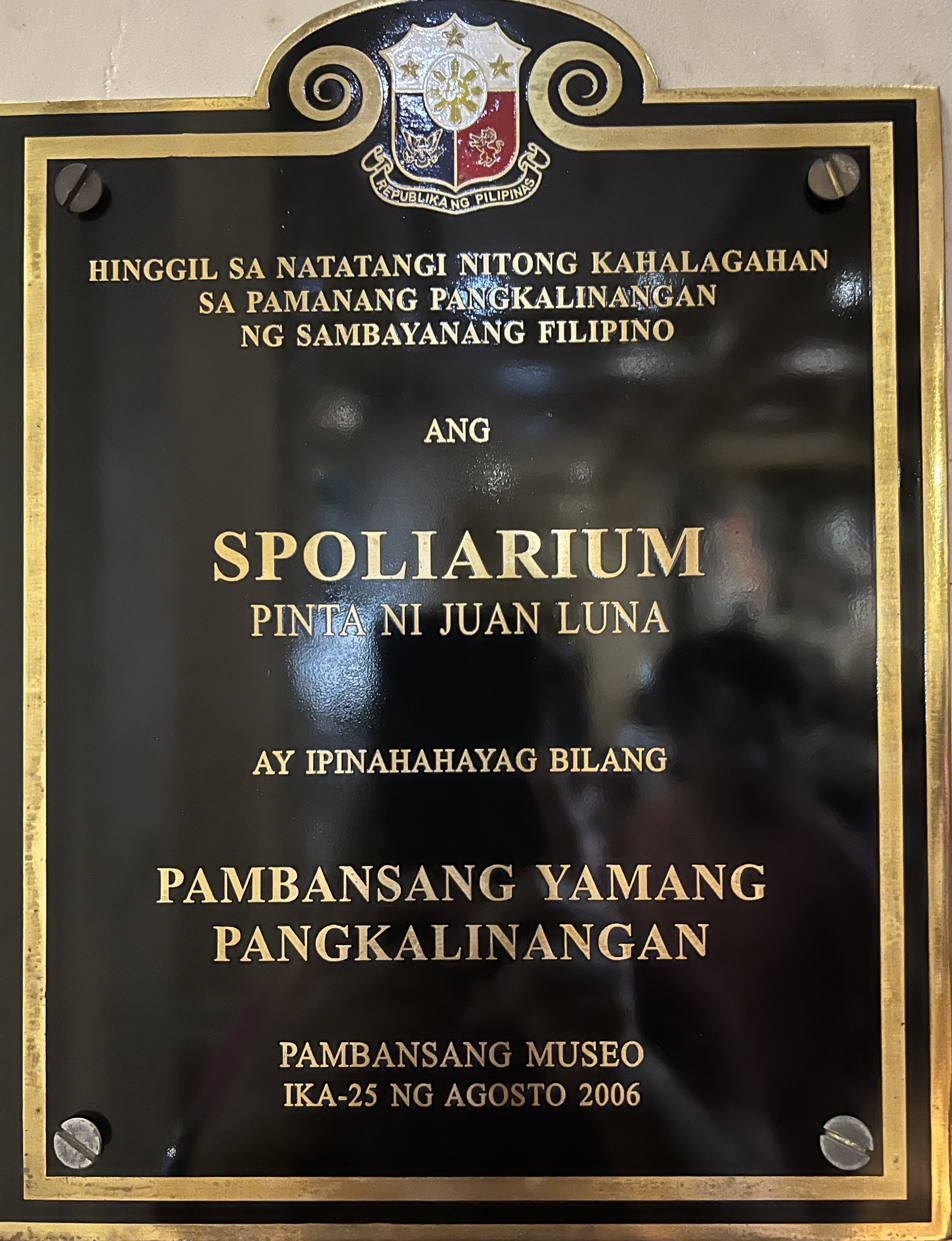
National Cultural Treasure marker

In 1885, the painting was bought (while still in Paris) by the provincial government of Barcelona for 20,000 pesetas, after being exhibited in Rome, Madrid, and Paris. It was transferred to the Museo del Arte Moderno in Barcelona in 1887, where it was in storage until the museum was burned and looted during the Spanish Civil War in 1937. Under orders of the Spanish dictator Francisco Franco, the damaged painting was sent to Madrid for restoration, where it stayed for 18 years. The calls for the painting's transfer to Manila by Filipinos and sympathetic Spaniards in the 1950s led to Franco's orders to finish the painting's restoration and eventual donation to the Philippines. After the restoration work was done in late 1957, the painting was then turned over to Philippine ambassador to Spain Manuel Nieto Sr. in January 1958, and later sent to the Philippines as a gift from the government of Spain.

The Spoliarium was broken up into three pieces, with each piece going into its own shipping crate, because of its size. The painting was mounted on a wooden frame at the then-Department of Foreign Affairs building (present-day Department of Justice) building) on Padre Faura Street, Ermita, Manila. Artist Antonio Dumlao was chosen by Carlos da Silva, as head of the Juan Luna Centennial Commission, to perform relining and cleaning of the painting. The mounting, framing, and architectural work was done by Carlos da Silva. A newly restored Spoliarium was then unveiled in the Hall of Flags of the Department of Foreign Affairs in December 1962.

The painting was cleaned by Suzano "Jun" Gonzalez in 1982. In 2005, another restoration was made by Art Restoration and Conservations Specialists Inc., headed by painter June Poticar Dalisay. As of the present day, the painting is housed in the National Museum of Fine Arts.

== Other versions ==
=== Existing versions of the Spoliarium ===
Philippine historians Ambeth Ocampo and Santiago Albano Pilar have stated that there are at least four known versions of the Spoliarium that exist with the much larger 1884 version being in the collection of the National Museum of Fine Arts. Two smaller versions are known to exist that are presently in private collections, while the other was commissioned for a Russian nobleman that remains unlocated.

=== The boceto for Spoliarium ===
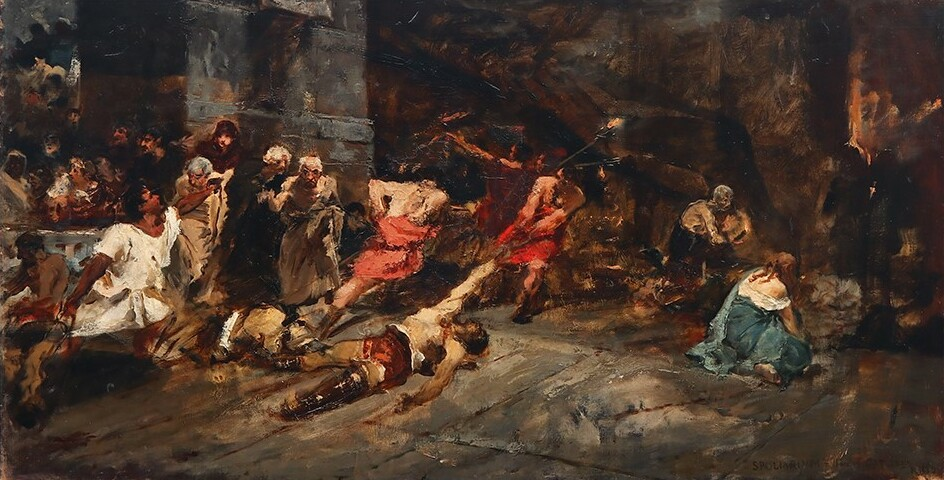
The boceto for Spoliarium, Oil on canvas, 74 × 144.5 cm, Private collection, Philippines.

In 2018, a forgotten boceto (study) of the Spoliarium was rediscovered after nearly 125 years. The boceto is considered the earliest version of the work and is dated from 1883, made ascribed on the canvas itself with the words, SPOLIARIVM - boceto LVNA, R[OMA], 1883, making this version the earliest. Based on the literature, the study featured a peculiar signature written by Luna in baybayin script on the canvas's lower right side. The script for the word BU LA[N], was deduced from the Ilocano language for moon, which the artist added only to about four of his known works.

The boceto was last publicly exhibited at the 1893 Exposición Histórico-Natural y Etnográfica at the National Archaeological Museum in Madrid. Further research revealed that its provenance is part of the collection of the Philippine politician Pedro Paterno, a known friend and patron of Luna.

The painting later ended in the ownership of Don Jose Vazquez Castiñeira, a former mayor of Sarria, a municipality in the province of Lugo in Spain for nearly 130 years. It is believed that Paterno having been appointed as the new Director of the Museo-Biblioteca de Filipinas, the paintings were later sold or given to the Vazquez Castiñeiras. Paterno was married to Maria Luisa Piñeiro de Paterno who originated from Galicia, the same area were Vazquez Castiñeiras hailed from.

In 1996, Maria Nuñez Rodriguez, a childless widow of Don Francisco Vazquez Gayoso summoned her relatives into her household able to divide her estate. Included in the said estate were Philippine works of art that included an earlier version of España y Filipinas (1884) by Luna, the Spoliarium study, La Pintura, a work by Luna's contemporary Félix Resurrección Hidalgo, and other Philippine works of art.

The work was subsequently sold for a record price of PHP73.584 million (US$1.36 million) at a Salcedo Auctions' Important Philippine Art sale in the Philippines.
