= Félix Resurrección Hidalgo =

Filipino painter (1855–1913)

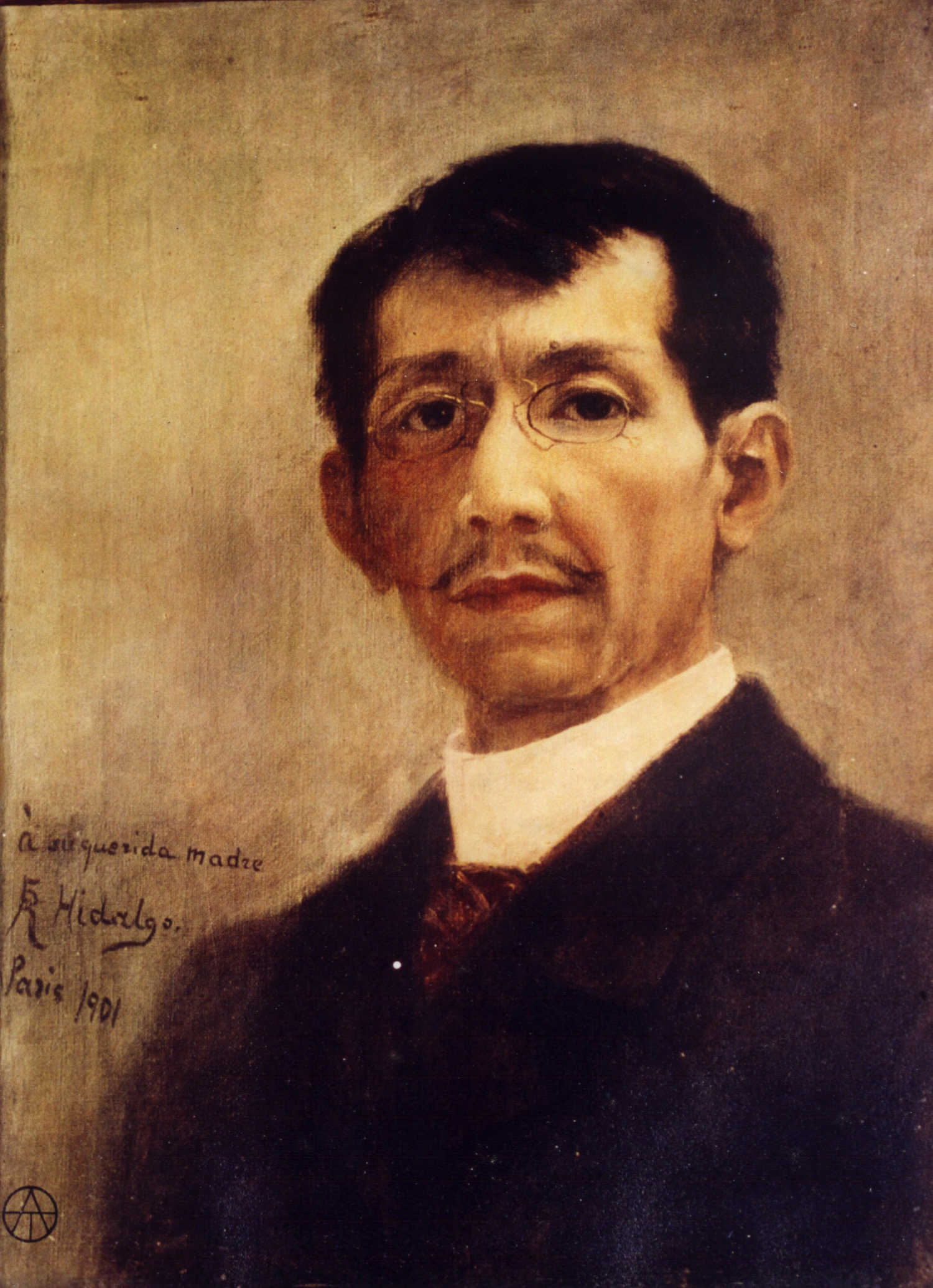
- Self Portrait (1901), Private collection of Tony and Cecile Gutiérrez, Makati City.
- Born: Félix Resurrección Hidalgo y Padilla; February 21, 1855; Binondo, Manila, Captaincy General of the Philippines, Spanish Empire
- Died: March 13, 1913 (aged 58); Barcelona, Spain
- Resting place: Cementerio del Norte, Manila
- Education: Real Academia de Bellas Artes de San Fernando
- Known for: Painting, drawing
- Notable work: Las Virgenes Cristianas Expuestas al Populacho, 1884, La barca de Aqueronte, 1887 in museums: Metropolitan Museum of Manila; Lopez Museum; National Museum of the Philippines
- Movement: Impressionism, Neoclassicism

Félix Resurrección Hidalgo y Padilla (February 21, 1855 – March 13, 1913) was a Filipino artist. He is acknowledged as one of the greatest Filipino painters of the late 19th century, and is significant in Philippine history for having been an acquaintance and inspiration for members of the Philippine reform movement which included José Rizal, Marcelo del Pilar, Mariano Ponce, and Graciano López Jaena, although he neither involved himself directly in that movement, nor later associated himself with the First Philippine Republic under Emilio Aguinaldo.

His winning the silver medal in the 1884 Madrid Exposition of Fine Arts, along with the gold win of fellow Filipino painter Juan Luna, prompted a celebration which was a major highlight in the memoirs of members of the Philippine reform movement, with Rizal toasting to the two painters' good health and citing their win as evidence that Filipinos and Spaniards were equals.

== Early life and education ==
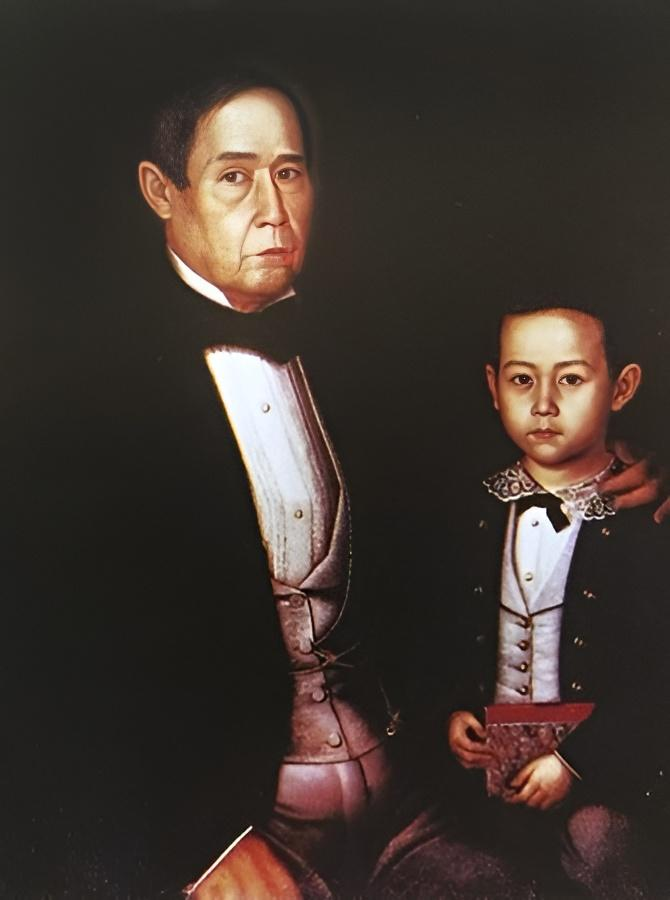
Hidalgo as a young child with his grandfather Don Narciso Padilla, a lawyer

Hidalgo was born in Binondo, Manila on February 21, 1855. He was the third of seven children of Eduardo Resurrección Hidalgo and María Bárbara Padilla. He studied law in the University of Santo Tomas, though he never finished it. His interests in the arts made him study art in Europe, from 1879 to 1881 under a scholarship funded by the Spanish government at the Real Academia de Bellas Artes de San Fernando in Madrid. He was also enrolled under Spanish painter Agustin Saez at the Escuela de Dibujo y Pintura.

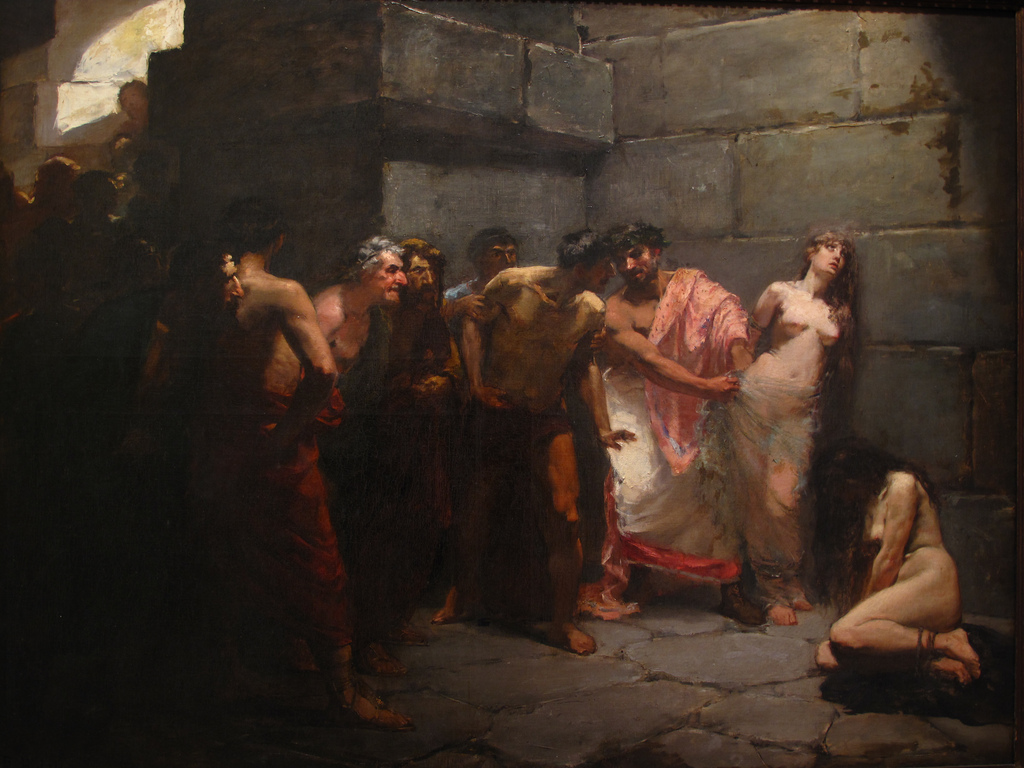
Las Virgenes Cristianas Expuestas al Populacho (1884). Metropolitan Museum of Manila.

In 1876, he previewed his works, La barca and Vendedora de lanzones, among others, at the Teatro Circo de Bilibid before they were sent to the Centennial Exposition in Philadelphia, Pennsylvania that same year. In 1878, he painted Los mendigos.

== Life abroad ==
In 1877, Resurrección Hidalgo was awarded second place

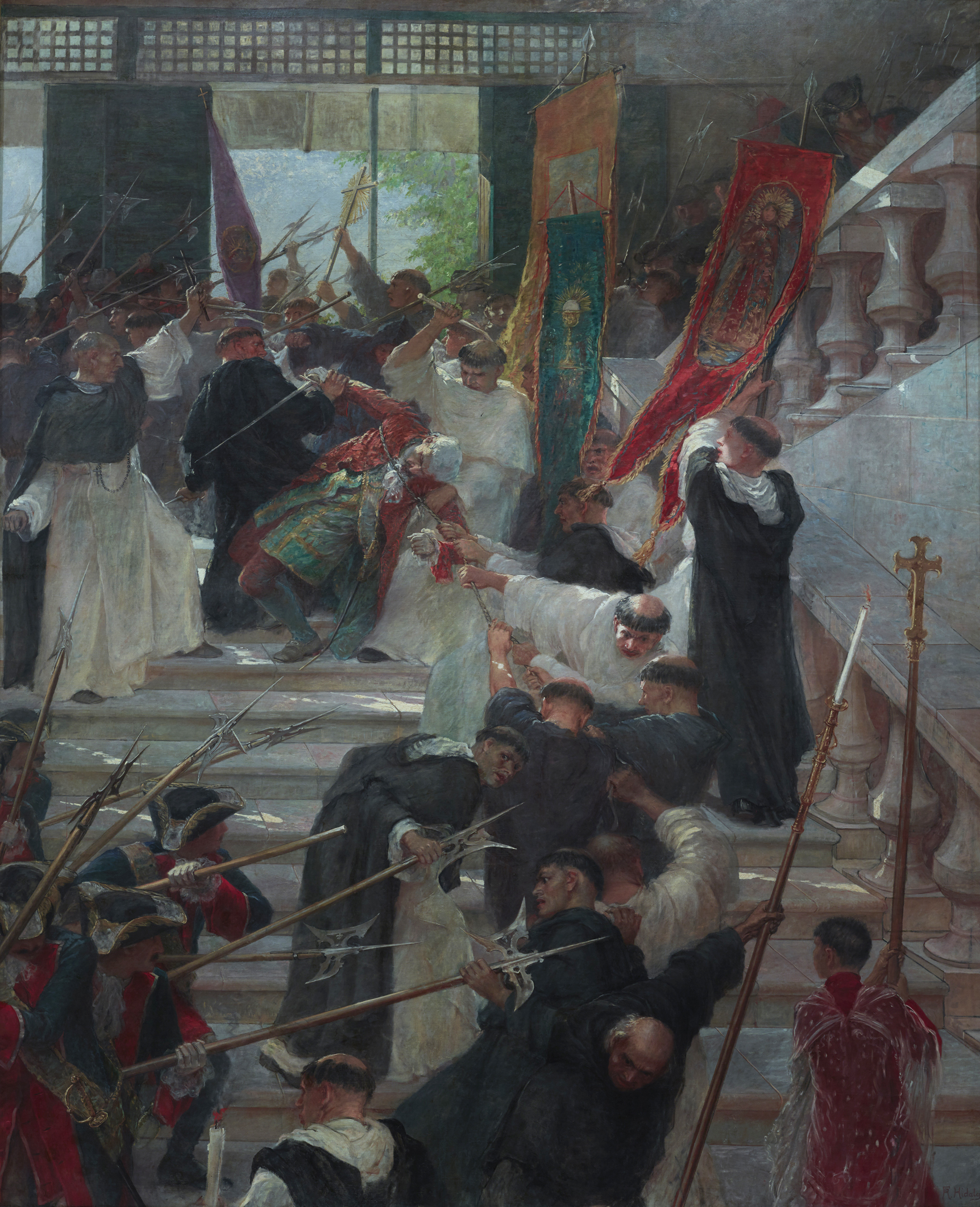
El Asesinato del Gobernador Bustamante (1904), depicting the assassination of the governor-general in 1719. It is now kept at the National Museum of Fine Arts in Manila.

in the contest for best cover design for the deluxe edition of Fr. Manuel Blanco's Flora de Filipinas. In 1879, Hidalgo left for Spain as a pensionado in fine arts of the Ayuntamiento de Manila.

His Las Virgenes Cristianas Expuestas al Populacho, was awarded the ninth silver medal at the 1884 Exposición General de Bellas Artes in Madrid. This showed a group of boorish looking males mocking semi-naked female Christians, one of whom is seated in the foreground, with head bowed in misery. In the same exposition, Luna's Spoliarium was awarded a gold medal.

In the Exposición General de las Islas Filipinas in Madrid in 1887, Hidalgo presented La barca de Aqueronte and Laguna estigia for which he received a gold medal. La barca was again shown at the Exposition Universelle in Paris and was awarded a silver medal by an international jury. In 1891, it was accorded a diploma of honor at the Exposición General de Bellas Artes of Barcelona. This painting also received a gold medal in the International Exposition of Fine Arts in Madrid during the commemoration of the 400th anniversary of the discovery of the Americas.

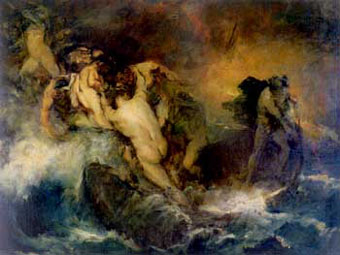
La barca de Aqueronte, (1887). Museo Nacional de Pintura, Madrid.

He exhibited Adios del Sol, 1891 at the Exposición Internacional de Bellas Artes in Madrid in that year and El crepusculo at the Universal Exposition in Chicago. He showed both paintings again at the Exposición Artistica de Bilbao in August 1894. In the Exposición Regional de Filipinas in Manila in January 1895, Hidalgo was represented by his paintings done in the grand romantic manner. In April of the same year he exhibited Oedipus y Antigone, El violinista, Cabeza napolitana, Cabeza del viejo, Un religioso, and others at the Salon at Champs-Élysées in Paris.

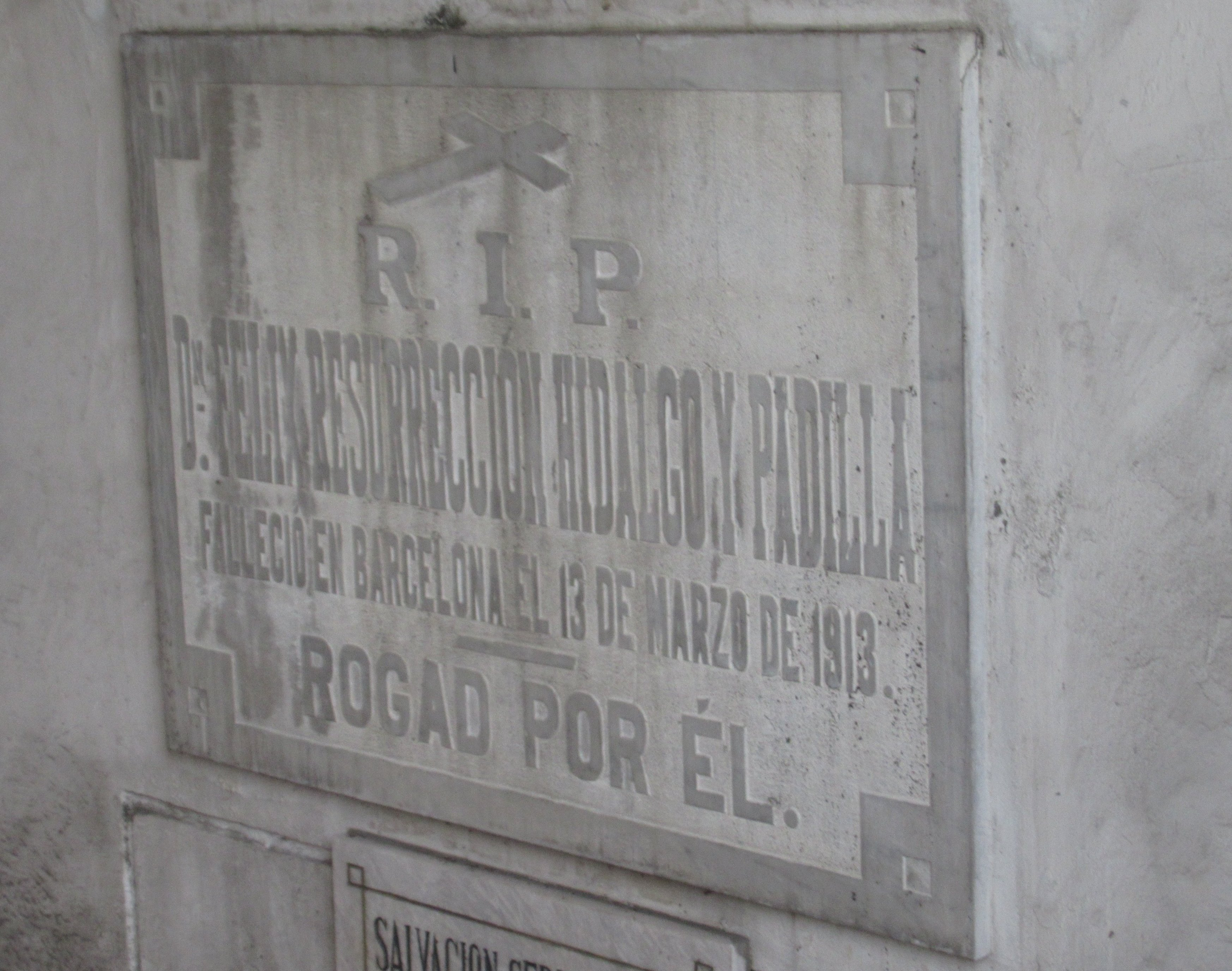
Hidalgo's grave at Manila North Cemetery.

Hidalgo received a gold medal for his overall participation at the Universal Exposition in St. Louis, Missouri in 1904. His El violinista was individually accorded a gold medal. In 1912, he visited his relatives in Manila for six months, after which he hurried back to Paris to see his dying mother. The following year, Resurrección-Hidalgo died in Barcelona where he went to recuperate from failing health. His remains were brought to the Philippines, where it now lies entombed at the Cementerio del Norte in Manila.

== Books and publications ==
- Félix Resurrección Hidalgo & the Generation of 1872 by Alfredo R. Roces, Eugenio López Foundation, 1998.
- A Guide to Luna and Hidalgo Paintings in the López Memorial Museum by Lopez Museum, Eugenio López Foundation, 1979.

== Major artworks ==
- La barca, 1876
- Vendedora de lanzones, 1876
- Las Virgenes Cristianas Expuestas al Populacho, 1884
- The Young Woman Sewing, 1885
- Jesucristo, 1887
- La barca de Aqueronte, 1887
- La Laguna Estigia, 1887
- La Pintura, Undated (c. 1890s)
- Adios del Sol, 1891
- El crepusculo, 1893
- Oedipus y Antigone, 1895
- El violinista, 1895
- Cabeza napolitana, 1895
- Cabeza del viejo, 1895
- Un religioso, 1895
- Self portrait, 1901
- Per Pacem et Libertatem, 1903

== Legacy ==
In 1988, Hidalgo and works of his contemporary Juan Luna were jointly exhibited in a major retrospective exhibition, First National Juan Luna and Félix Resurrección Hidalgo Commemorative Exhibition at the Metropolitan Museum of Manila featuring works gathered from leading public and private collections.

== Auction history ==
Several paintings by Hidalgo rank among the most expensive paintings in Philippine art ever sold at auction. In 2016, La Inocencia (1901) a portrait from the private collection of the Legarda collection, sold for PHP 40.88 million (US$823,695.35) at Leon Gallery in the Philippines. In October 2018, an earlier work from the Philippine period Pareja de jóvenes tagalos ante un rio (1879) was sold for PHP51.60 million (US$957,863.78) at Subastas Segre in Spain that served previously as the world record.

Subsequently, in December 2018, an Untitled (Sailing off the Cliffs of Étretat in Normandy) (1909) was sold for a record PHP30.368 million (US$579,431.41) at Leon Gallery becoming Hidalgo's first work from his later period to surpass the PHP30 million mark.

In 2019, La Pintura (1890s) painting by Hidalgo was sold for a record PHP 78.256 million (US$1.51 million) at Salcedo Auctions in the Philippines, becoming the most expensive artwork sold by the artist internationally.

== See also ==
- Antonio Luna
- Juan Luna
- José Rizal
- José Honorato Lozano
- Damián Domingo
- Fernando Amorsolo
- Fabián de la Rosa
- Justiniano Asunción

== Sources ==
- Ocampo, Ambeth (October 3, 2008), "Looking Back: A gifted painter now almost forgotten", Philippine Daily Inquirer, archived from the original on July 31, 2013
