= Hispania (personification) =

Anthropomorphic personification of Spain

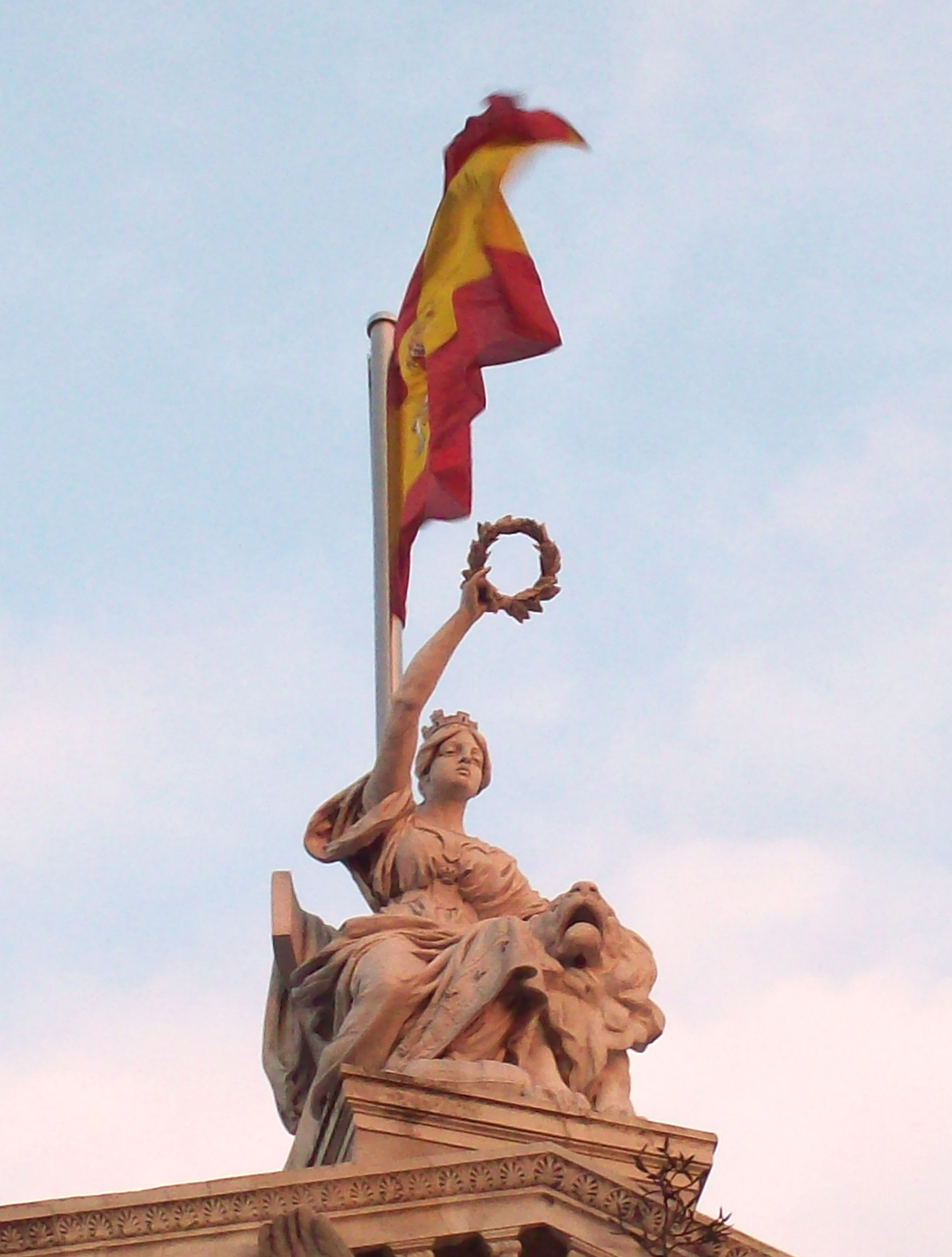
Hispania, who symbolically rewards the ingenious works of her children with a laurel crown. By Agustín Querol. Biblioteca Nacional de España.

Hispania is the national personification of Spain.

The antecedent of this representation were some coins on which there was a horseman holding a lance and the legend HISPANORVM. These coins corresponded to the first half of the 2nd century BC and were minted in Morgantina (Sicily). These coins were carried out by the Hispanic mercenaries who received the government of this Sicilian city by order of the Roman Senate during the Second Punic War.

The first representation of Hispania appeared during the Roman Republic as the head of a woman with the legend HISPAN, and was minted in Rome by the Roman family Postumia (81 B.C.). Since then different coins emerged with allegorical representations of Hispania with different characteristics during the entire Roman era.

Like other coins with provincial allegories, it would fall into disuse due to the prevalence of symbols of Rome and Constantinople being minted on coins and would not reappear until the Spanish peseta, which itself was based upon the allegory used during the reign of Hadrian. From then on, the allegory would be made into monuments, statues and reliefs.

== Hispania in numismatics ==
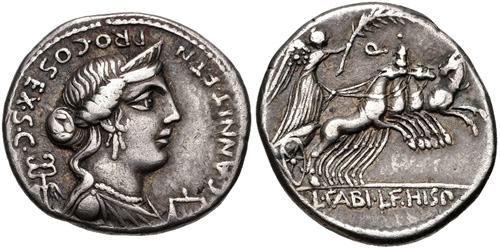
Coin minted by the Annia family where you can read L. F. FABI. L. F. HISP. / Q.

The antecedent of the allegory of Hispania was a series of coins minted in Morgantina (Sicily) by Hispanic mercenaries who ruled this city by order of the Senate during the Second Punic War. In these, an equine horseman with a spear and with the legend HISPANORVM was represented. The next known reference to Hispania was a coin minted by the Annia family where the legend appears: L. F. FABI. L.F. HISP. / Q which was an abbreviation for Lucius Fabius L.f. Hispaniensis / Quaestor. This coin was minted to commemorate the participation of Lucius Fabius during a campaign in Hispania in the Sertorian War.

=== The beginnings ===
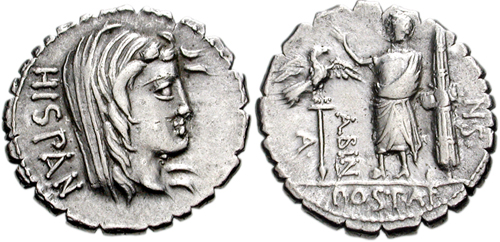
denarius with the legend HISPAN and Hispania.

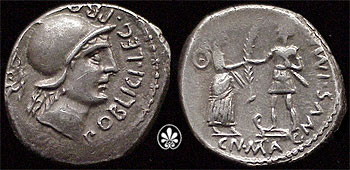
Denarius minted by the son of Pompey (Cn. Pompey). He (Cn. Pompey) and Hispania appears on the reverse.

The first representation of Hispania arose in the Roman Republic. It consisted of a woman's head with the legend HISPAN. It was minted in Rome by the Postumia family in 81 a. C. referring to his predecessor L. Postumius Albinus, who was praetor in the year 180 B.C. and sent to Hispania as governor, standing out for his victories against Lusitanians and Vacceos. The representation denotes the identity of the Iberian Peninsula as Hispania despite being divided at that time into Citerior and Ulterior.

During the civil wars of Pompey the Great against Julius Caesar, his son Gnaeus Pompey minted a new denary from Baetica (probably near Corduba), which shows Hispania on the reverse as a full-length, standing woman presenting a palm to the son of Pompey the Great. Some authors, such as A. Burgos, believe that it represents Baetica. However, the two spears and the round shield (caetra) seem more like an allusion to Hispania.

There are also other coins related to Hispania, such as several denarius from the Annia gens (82–81 BC.) with the legend HIS alluding to Hispania, but without allegorical representation. Other denarii of the Coelia family (51 BC.) with the same legend inscribed on a standard and the wild boar, symbol of the city of Clunia (Hispania Tarraconense) in commemoration of the victories of Caius Coelius, governor of the Citerior. There is also a denarius from the gens Fundania (101 BC.) that probably refers to the victory over Numancia. Another from the gens Fabia (127 a. C.), probably commemorating the victories over the Lusitanians and their leader Viriathus.

=== Rise and consolidation ===
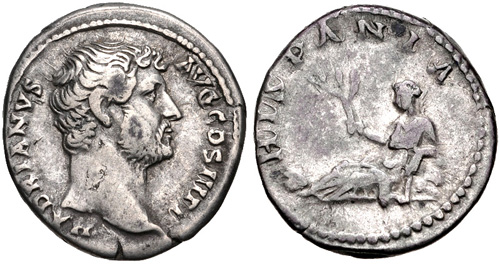
Denarius of Hadrian with the allegory of Hispania. Made in commemoration of Hadrian's journey to Hispania.

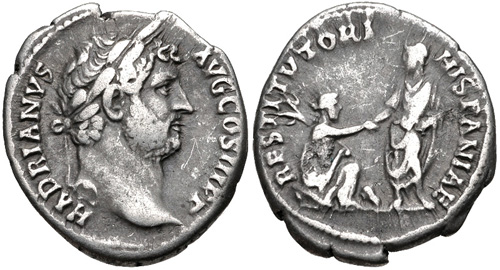
Hadrian's denarius. With the legend RESTITVTORI HISPANIAE, where the emperor appears helping Hispania. Although it is not very well appreciated on this coin, the attributes of an olive branch and a rabbit appear at the feet of Hispania.

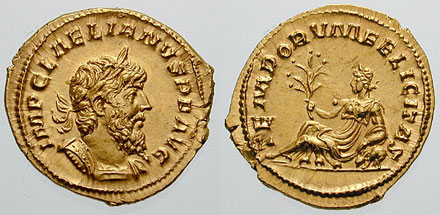
Aureus of Laelian with the allegory of Hispania.

In the period of the so-called Pax Romana new allegorical representations of Hispania were created. At this time, the Hispanic peninsula was divided into three regions: Tarraconensis, Lusitania and Bætica. However, the coins minted by Galba, Vitellius and Vespasian (68–69 AD period) show Hispania as a unit and were issued in Hispania from Tarraco, but not only in Hispania, but also in Rome and in some places in Gaul.

The legend HISPANIA appeared for the first time in the Galba empire, complete with two types of representations: One with a bust of a young woman and the other with a full-length woman; both stamped with laurel and dressed in a stole and tunic, their attributes being the ears of corn —symbol of fertility— and two indigenous weapons, the short javelins and the round shield or caetra. The series of denarii issued by Galba in Tarraco (from April to June 68 AD) represent the emperor in an equestrian position oriented to the left and in others to the right or his bust on the obverse and with the legend HISPANIA. It has the attributes of spikes, javelins and caetra. Its corresponding gold coin was possibly also minted in Tarraco.

A golden coin with Hispania in full length also appears at that time. It shows the bust of the emperor Augustus deified with radiated crown and on the back the allegory of Hispania, shelf and carrying ears of wheat in his right hand, two javelins and the caetra with his left hand, with the legend HISPANIA at the top.

Galba honored Clunia for giving him shelter in the early days of the rebellion and for having proclaimed him emperor on the death of Nero. For this reason, he would mint an impressive sestertius in Rome with the legend HISPANIA CLVNIA SVL(PICIA) S C. on its reverse. In this Galba appears seated in a curule chair, holding the parazonium and receiving Palladium at the hands of the representation of the goddess of the city who carries cornucopia.

The allegory of Hispania standing, with its usual attributes and the legend HISPANIA also appears with Vespasian (69–70 AD).

Hadrian made frequent trips to many provinces of the Empire, and to commemorate these trips in a propagandistic way, coins relating to these trips were minted by each province. One of them corresponds to Hadrian's trip to Hispania. The most famous allegory of Hispania was coined in Rome; it was a female figure with a long tunic, stamped with laurel or olive, reclining to the left, with her left arm on some rocks, which could refer to the Pyrenees. With his right hand he holds an olive branch. At the feet of the figure appears a rabbit, the animal that the Phoenicians theoretically used to name the peninsula: Hishphanim.

In 269 AD the usurper Laelian minted a gold coin with the legend TEMPORVM FELICITAS alluding to its Hispanic origin and once again rescued the allegory of Hispania from Hadrian's model. It would be the last to appear until 1869.

=== Declining ===
Rome and Constantinople monopolized all the protagonism in the monetary actions. The continuous changes in the division of the administrative office of the Empire had left aside the old provinces and their allegories.

=== Early Modern ages' medals ===
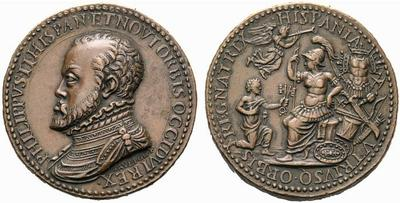
Medal of Philip II. The humiliated enemy appears, surrendering to a well-equipped warrior Hispania.

The figure of Hispania as matron with the olive branch and the rabbit as it appeared in the period of the Roman Empire will not appear again on any coin until the 19th century, although Hispania will appear in some medals that were created from the 16th century to the 18th century, although with a more martial attitude, very similar to Britannia wearing a Corinthian helmet and armed with a spear.

=== Reappearance in currency in the 19th century ===
In 1869 queen Isabel II is overthrown and the search for a new king begins. In that year the peseta was born with the allegory of Hispania from the time of Hadrian —in a recumbent position and with an olive branch—. The difference is that it was crowned with a mural crown instead of a laurel wreath and they added a rock alluding to Gibraltar. However, no reference to Hispania or Spain appeared. Later they would add the legend ESPAÑA.

In the transition period between the overthrow and the establishment of the First Republic (1869–1873), several different coins were minted representing Hispania, always reclining, on a rock or sitting with a lion. Among these, stands out a gold coin from 1870 —which was never issued— with a value of 100 pesetas and which represented Hispania standing up and without a mural crown.

19th century coins with the allegory of Hispania
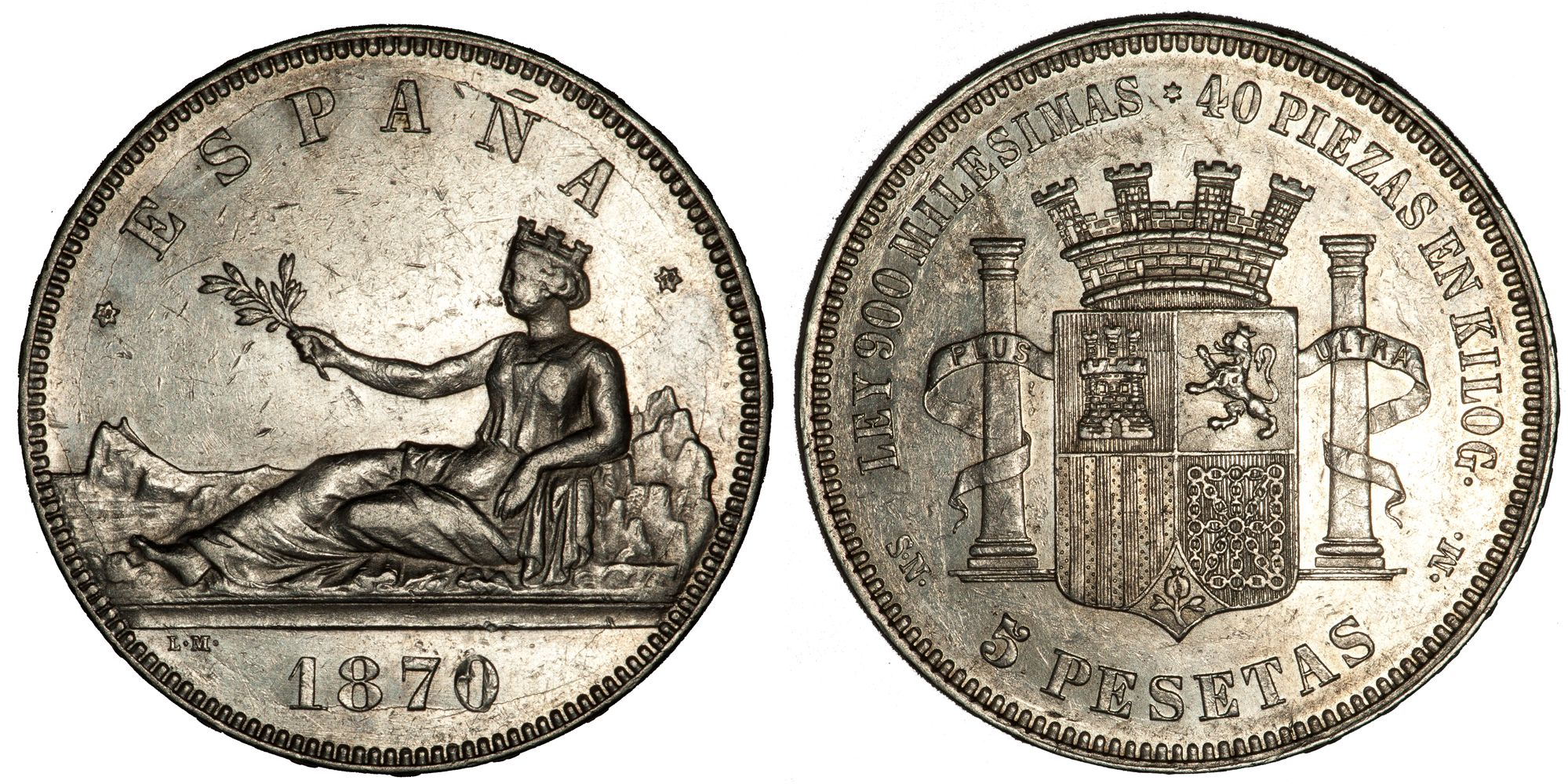
Coin with the legend ESPAÑA and with the allegory of Hispania.

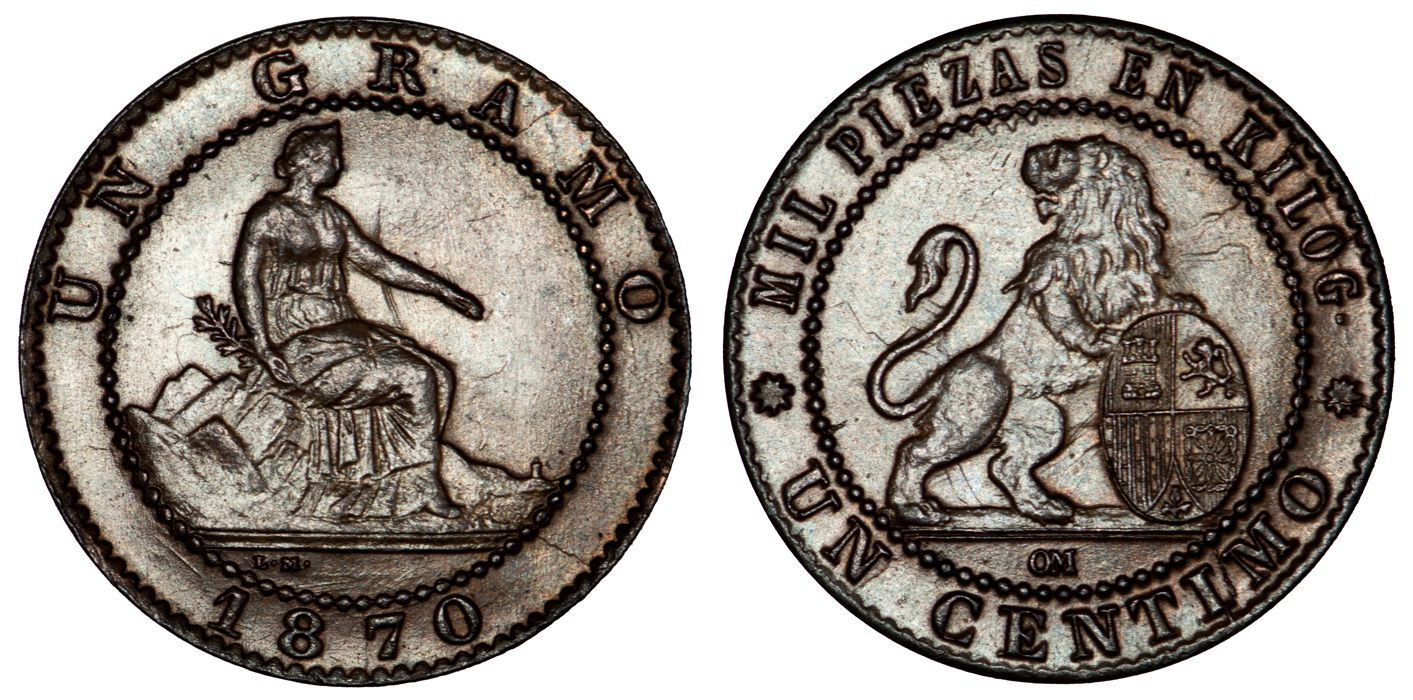
One-cent coin with the allegory of Hispania seated and with the Hispanic lion on the obverse.

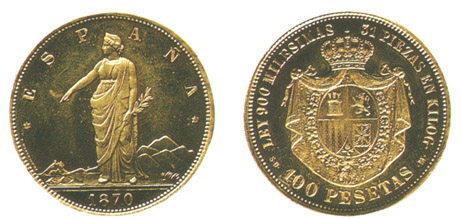
100 peseta gold coin with the allegory of Hispania standing.

=== Allegory of the First and Second Spanish Republic ===
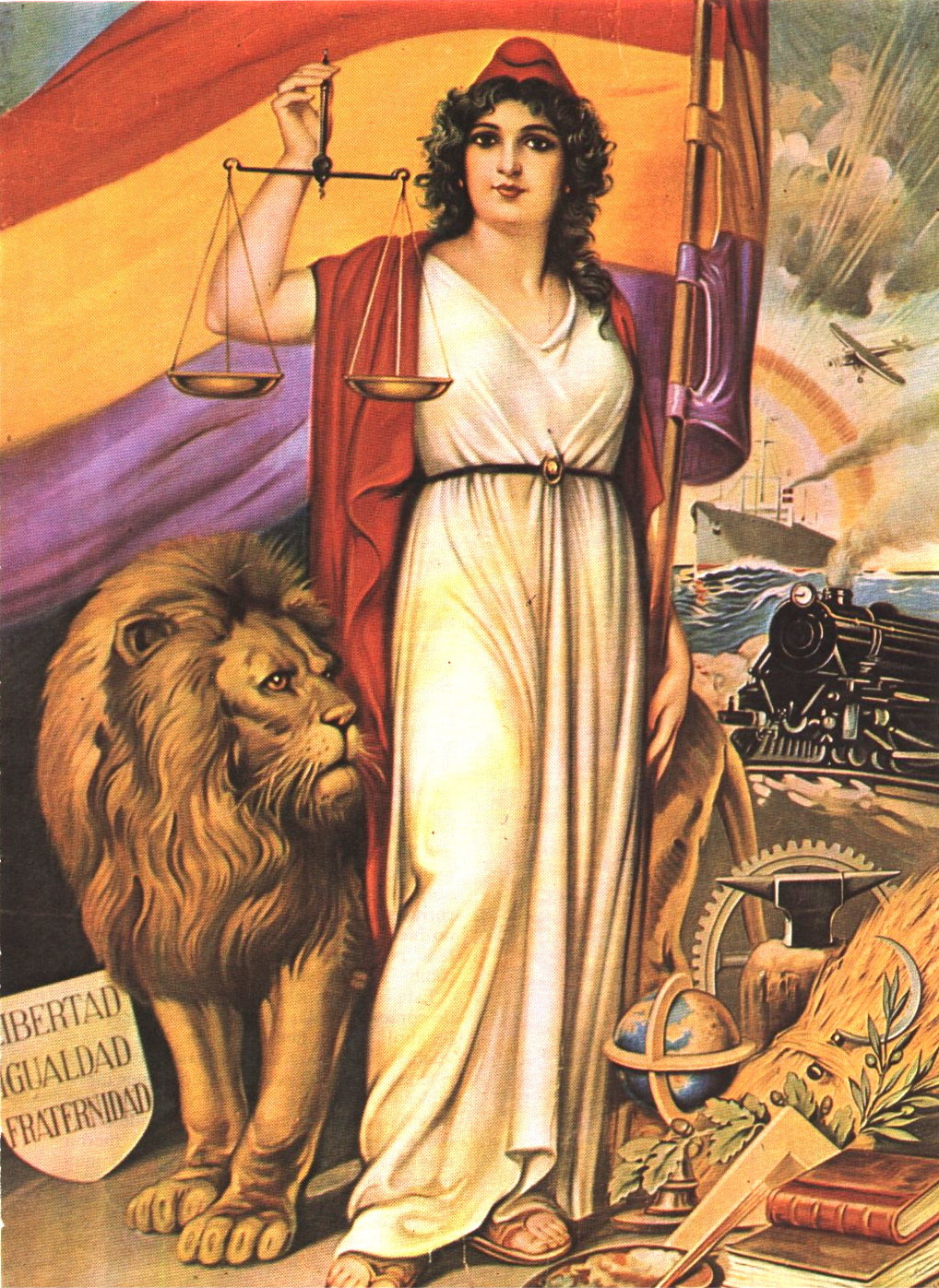
A 1931 allegory of Hispania during the Second Republic, displaying the Spanish tricolor and other republican symbolism.

This return to oblivion of the allegory was a perfect portrait to represent both the allegories of the First Republic and the Second Republic, also known as "La niña bonita" (the pretty girl). The first will appear with a phrygian cap and with a rooster very similar to Marianne and the second will be a version more faithful to Hispania that will appear on coins and banknotes issued by the republic. In any case, the allegory of the Second Republic will sometimes appear dressed in the mural crown, with a phrygian cap or with laurel crown, in addition to occasionally carrying olive branch. Therefore, the allegory of the First Republic was a version inspired by the French Marianne, since she always wore a Phrygian hat and appeared next to a gallic rooster (allegory of France), however that of the Second, depending on her attire, was more similar to Marianne or Hispania, in any case, regardless of the attire with which she was represented, she was always accompanied by the hispanic lion, an attribute inexorably associated with Hispania .

As an example, the Second Republic issued in 1933 a silver coin worth one peseta, which featured a woman with an olive branch, but this time in a seated position. This representation was considered as the allegory of the Republic, but the olive branch suggests that in this case it is an allegory of Hispania converted into an allegory of the Republic.

A year before the civil war broke out (1936), a 10-peseta bill was issued with the head of a woman with a mural crown. During the Spanish Civil War, the brass minted coin, known as "La rubia" (the blond) was possibly the most popular one peseta coin on the republican side and featured a female bust and with the u for REPVBLICA with v as in the Latin, another sign of the influence of Roman currency in the allegory of the Republic as if trying to imitate the Roman coins minted with the allegory of Hispania in their day.

Coins and banknotes of the Second Republic
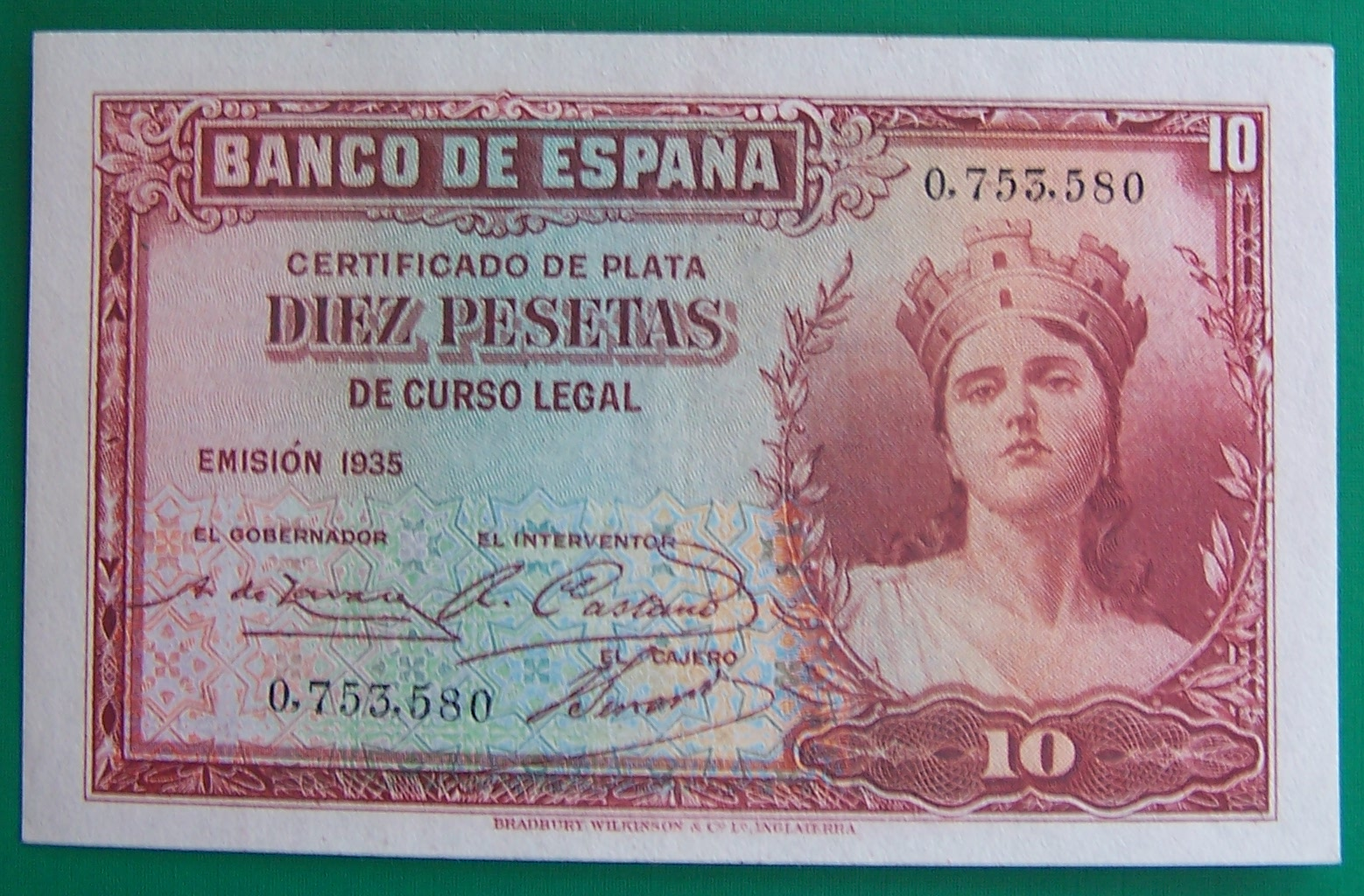
10 peseta banknote with the allegory of the Second Spanish Republic.

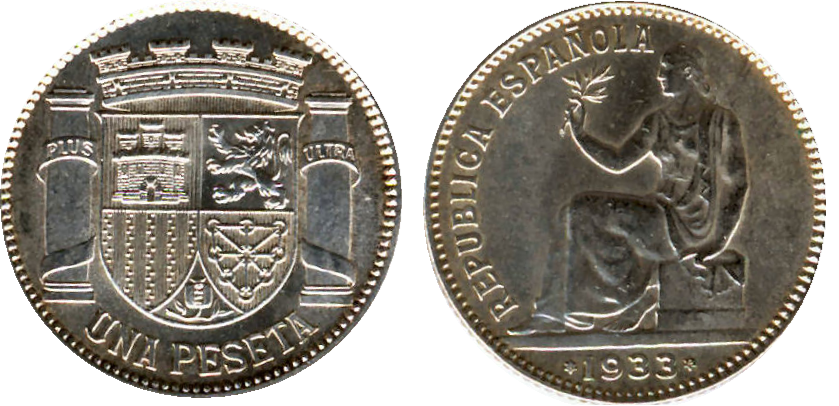
Coin of the Second Republic with the allegory of the Republic.

=== The allegory at the end of the peseta ===
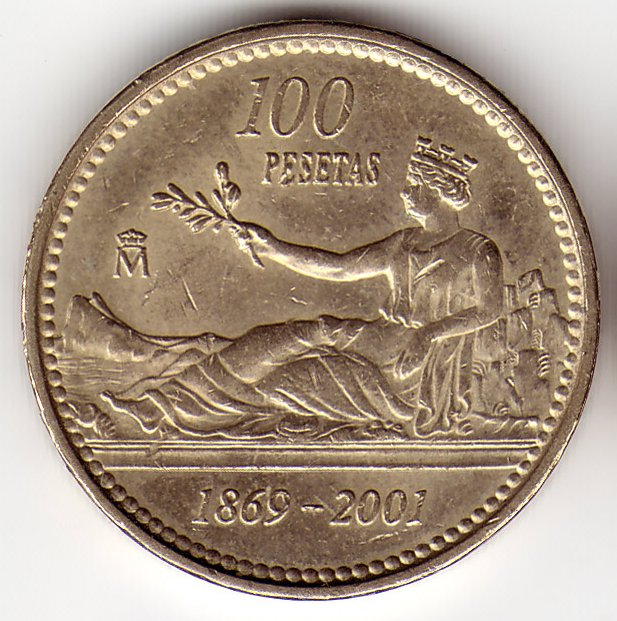
Allegory of Hispania on a 100 peseta coin.

The last minting of the peseta was in 2001. On January 1, 2002, it was replaced by the euro. Coins of 100 pesetas (also known as 20 duros) and 2000 pesetas in silver were then minted to commemorate the peseta, and the same image was represented as when it was born: the allegory of Hispania based on Hadrian's model but with a mural crown, exactly as it was reborn in the 19th century together with the Peseta.

With the arrival of the euro, no representation has the allegory. However, a medal with the symbolic value of 30 euros was created with the allegory of Hispania on its reverse as a commemoration of the European monetary agreement.

== Hispania in sculpture ==
Hispania has also often been represented in sculpture. The first representation in sculpture was perhaps that of Augustus of Prima Porta at the time of the Roman Empire. After this, we would have to wait for the 19th century, with the arrival of the romanticism movement, which awakened nationalism in the West, often recalling the past, and the neoclassicism that sought to imitate the classic works of the Antiquity.

Both currents promoted the creation of sculptural representations throughout Europe, with the allegories of the ancient Roman provinces in the form of women, as the Romans coined in their time on their coins. Thus the personifications of Britannia, Germania, Italia Turrita and Hispania were resurrected.

=== Augustus of Prima Porta ===
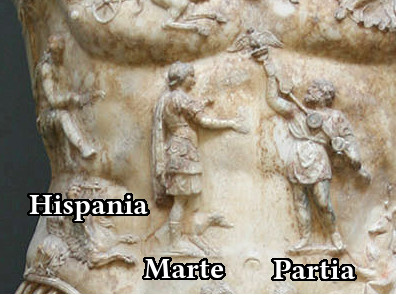
Detail of the breastplate of the Augustus of Prima Porta showing Hispania and Mars

On the breastplate of the statue of Augustus of Prima Porta Hispania appears on the right hand side (on the left when looking at the sculpture). It is found behind the back of Mars, god of war, in a seated and afflicted position carrying the gladius hispaniensis. The fact that it has been represented with its back to Mars and defeated alludes to the victory of Augustus against cantabrians and astures.

=== Pediment of Palacio de las Cortes ===
In the tympanum of the pediment of the Palacio de las Cortes in Madrid, which houses the Congress of Deputies, appears the allegory of Hispania embracing the constitution, surrounded by other allegories that allude to values and various disciplines seen from the worldview of the 19th century. These are: Abundance, Peace, Courage, Strength, Justice, Astronomy, Poetry and Mathematics, Sculpture, Painting, Architecture, Commerce and Agriculture. The tympanum was the work of Ponciano Ponzano.

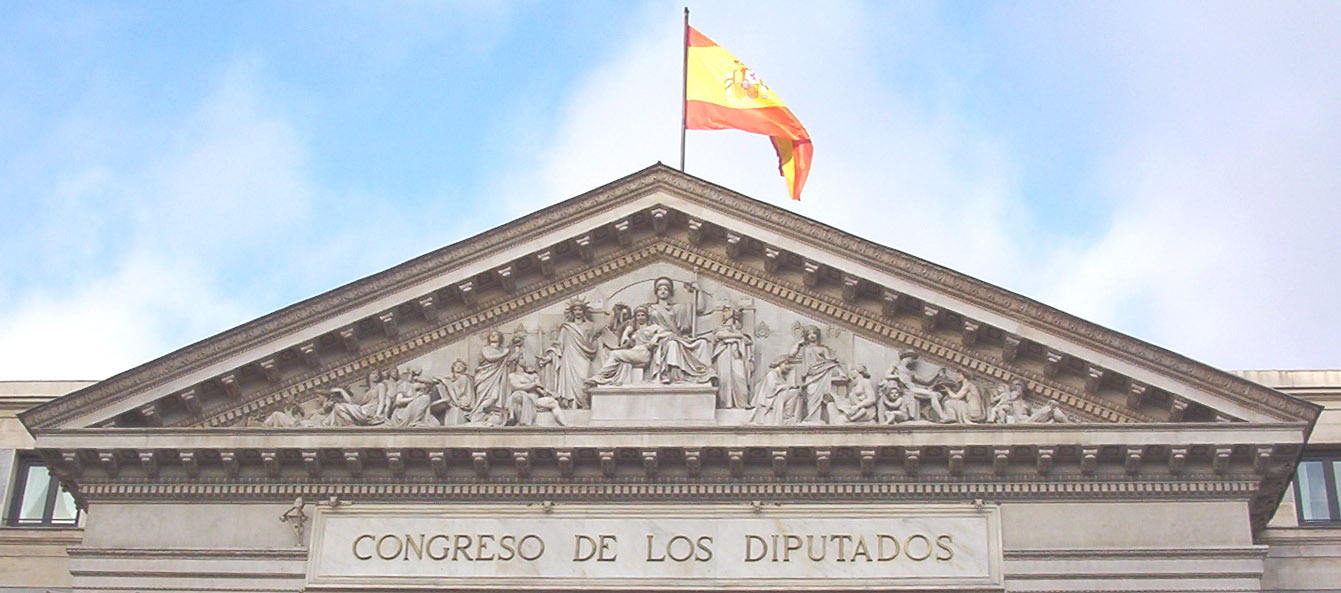
Hispania embracing the State Constitution accompanied by more allegorical representations.

=== National Library of Spain ===
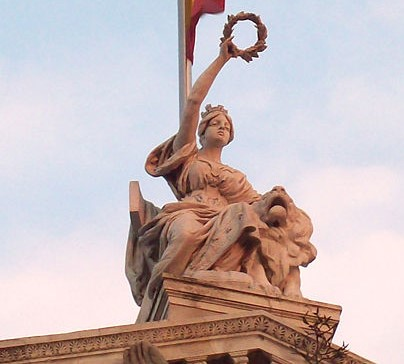
Hispania on top of the Biblioteca Nacional de España.

The pediment of the National Library of Spain was the work of Agustín Querol, who made it in marble. He finished it off with three sculptures, at the top Hispania appears next to the hispanic lion that represents Castilla —as heiress to the Kingdom of León— offering a laurel wreath as a prize for the literary works of her children.

On the right the Genius is represented and on the left the Study. In the center of the tympanum appears Peace, to its left appears the genius of War, Eloquence, poetry, Music, Architecture, Painting, Sculpture, Industry, Commerce and Agriculture. To the right of Peace appears Philosophy, Jurisprudence, History, Astronomy, Ethnography, Geography, Chemistry, Medicine and Mathematics. It represents "the triumph of the arts, sciences and letters, working under the protection of peace".

=== Puerta de Toledo ===
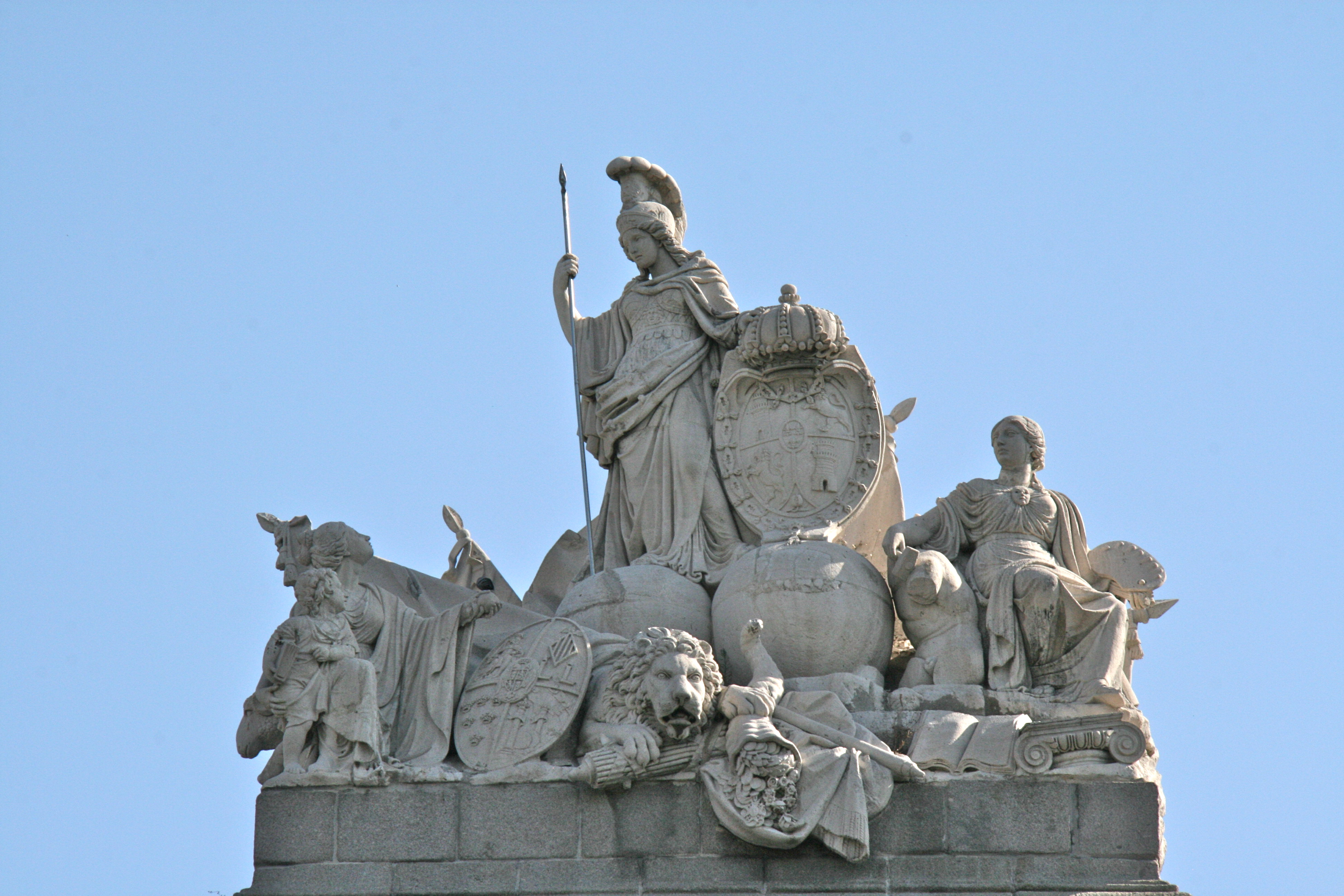
Representation of Hispania and provinces.

The Puerta de Toledo was a monument ordered to be built by Joseph Bonaparte in Madrid, but when he fled with the French troops it was not cancelled, but continued with the project although with some changes. On the façade facing south, the allegory of Spain is placed in the center supporting a shield placed on two hemispheres.

The allegory appears martial, with armor, a corinthian helmet and armed with a spear, it appears receiving a genius from the provinces, personified by a matron placed to the right of Hispania. To pass to the arts that are on the left, by another matron represented with the attributes of them. The sculpture was sculpted by José Ginés.

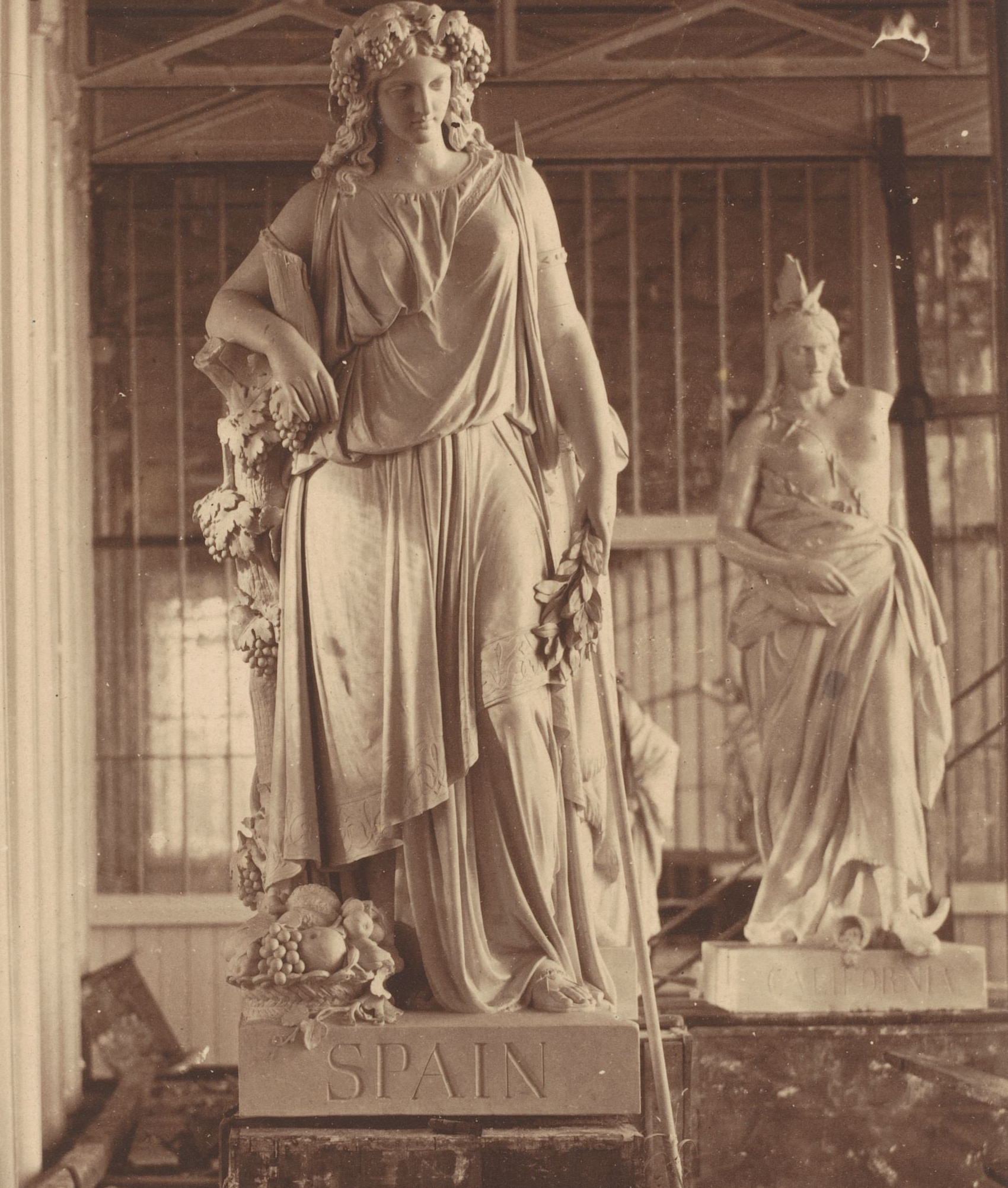
Sculpture made in the middle of the 19th century by the Italian sculptor Raffaelle Monti.

=== Statue of Raffaelle Monti ===
In the middle of the 19th century the Italian sculptor Raffaelle Monti sculpted an image of Hispania that he attributes as decoration on the terraces of the gardens of The Crystal Palace of the first Great World Exhibition of 1851 in London along with the personifications of other nations. The statue ended up in the Rijksmuseum in Amsterdam shortly thereafter and is likely lost.

This representation reflects how the author saw Spain in the 19th century. She holds a spear and a laurel branch in her left hand and leans with her right arm on a vine. Instead of a laurel wreath or a wall wreath, the Italian sculptor opted for a wreath of vine leaves and bunches of grapes. In the same way, more clusters hang from the vine and at its feet there is a basket with fruits and vegetables. It is possible that Spain was seen as an exporting country of fruit and wine. Precisely the German writer Goethe who was a contemporary of Monti although the writer was born quite a few years earlier, also referred to Spain as a wine country. In his work Faust Mephistopheles sings: Precisely we just come from Spain, the beautiful country of wine and songs.

Spain in the Alexander Hamilton building in New York City.

=== Seafaring Nations ===
Spain also has a statue made by the French sculptor Francois Michel Louis Tonetti in 1907 within the work called Seafaring Nations together with the personifications of eleven other nations of maritime tradition. These, apart from Spain, are: Greece, Rome, Phoenicia, Genoa, Venice, Netherlands, Portugal, Denmark, Germany, England and France.

The statue represents a Spain with the emblems of Castile and framed in the Age of Discoveries together with the sphere of a terrestrial globe and a shield where a carrack is represented. The group of sculptures is located on the facade of the former United States Custom House in New York City, now known as the Alexander Hamilton.

== Hispania in painting ==
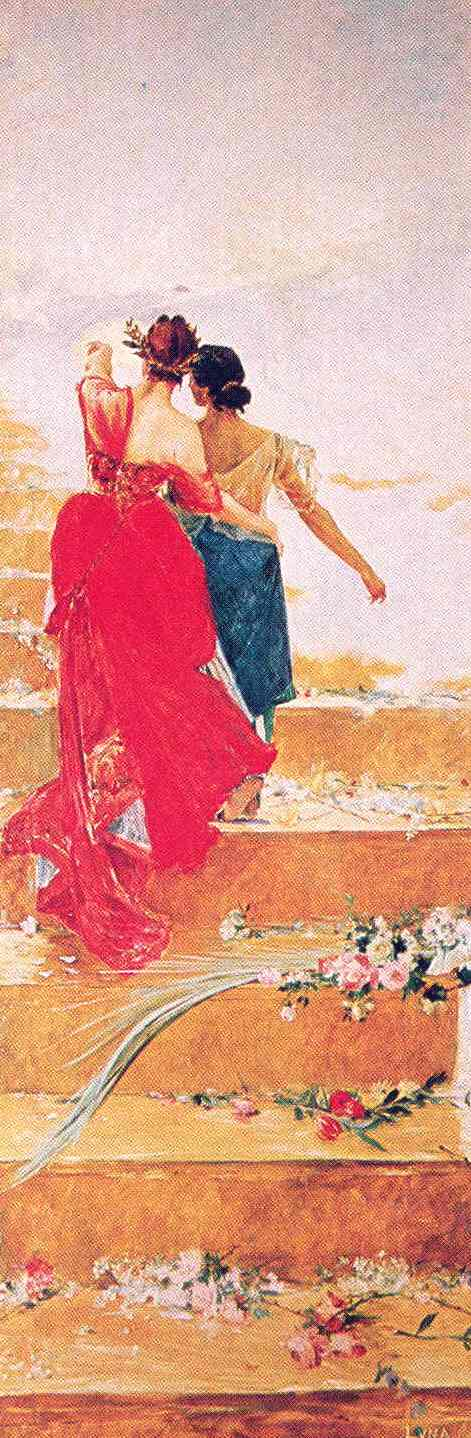
España y Filipinas.

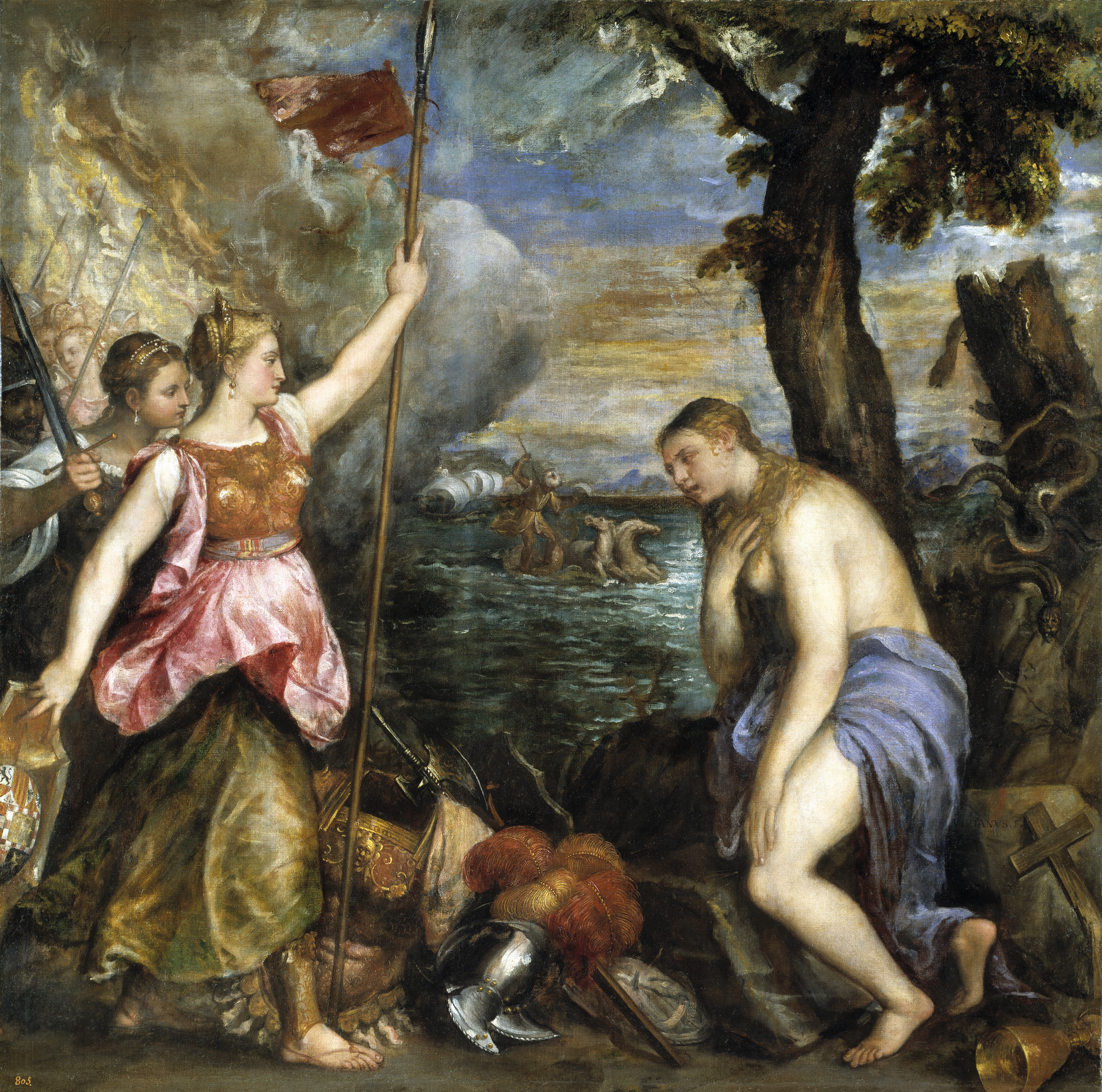
Religion saved by Spain, Tiziano.

Hispania or Spain has also been represented in painting from the 16th to the 19th century. Although in the medals that were made up to the 18th century with the allegory of Hispania the Latin name was preferred, in the painting the castilian name of Spain was preferred, to the detriment of Hispania.

=== Religion saved by Spain ===
In La Religión socorrida por España, a Spain appears as a matron with blonde hair, wearing a cuirass and armed with a spear from which a red banner of victory hangs, helping a helpless woman, an allegory of religion. In the background appears a Turk on a sinking Turkish galley representing the defeated Ottoman fleet.

This painting was painted by Titian without having been commissioned for Philip II after the Christian victory at the battle of Lepanto, in which although the Republic of Venice and the Papacy also participated, Spain had the greatest role.

=== The happy union of Spain and Parma together promote the sciences and the arts ===
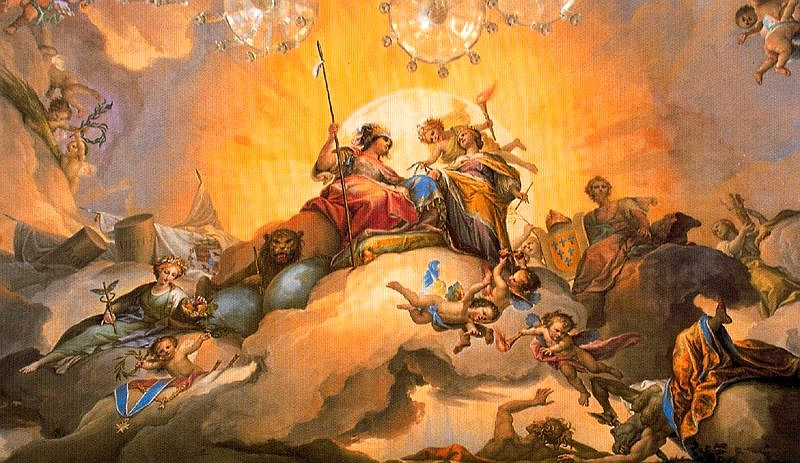
The happy union of Spain and Parma together promote the sciences and the arts.

Spain appears martial next to the lion of Castile and next to it its territory, Parma, and around it the allegories of the sciences and the arts in a fresco by Francisco Bayeu y Subías located in the little house of the prince of the Palacio del Pardo, in Madrid.

The Duchy of Parma became a territory of Spain because Philip V asserted the rights of his wife, Isabel de Farnesio over Parma, which would later be ceded to the Holy Roman Empire in exchange for the Kingdom of the Two Sicilies, although they would soon return because the Holy Roman Empire would return them to Philip I of Parma, son of Philip V, and infant of Spain, therefore Parma it returns to Spain and will remain under its dominion until 1801 when, through the Convention of Aranjuez, it was ceded by Carlos IV to France.

=== España y Filipinas ===
In Juan Luna's Spain and the Philippines, Spain is portrayed as white-skinned, brown-haired, and strongly built, guiding a young, slim, dark-skinned Philippines down the path of progress. It was painted by the Hispanophile Juan Luna as propaganda in favor of the metropolis in full 19th century. The painting occupies an important place in the López Museum of Pasig (Philippines).

=== The Spanish monarchy ===
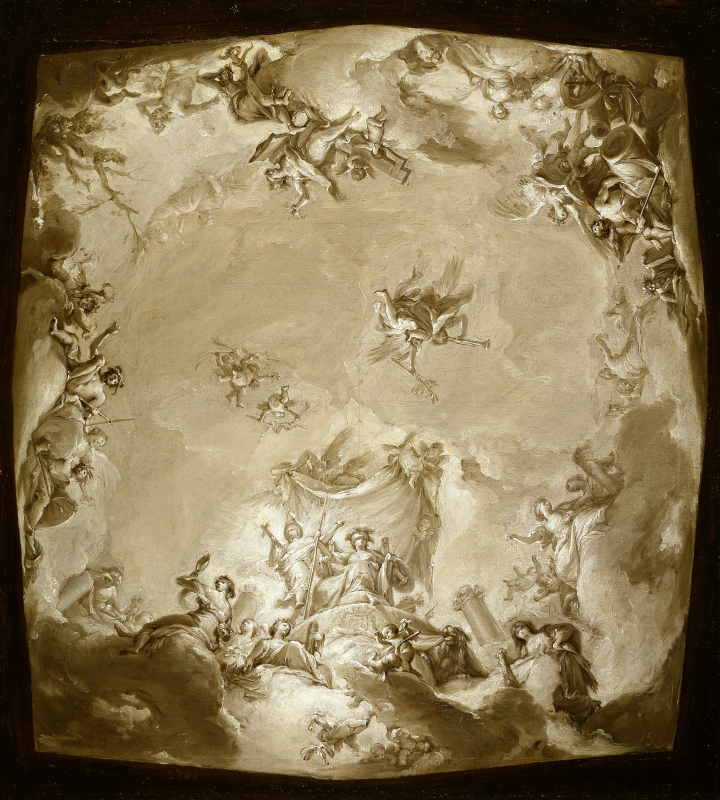
Sketch of The Spanish Monarchy by Francisco Bayeu y Subías.

Francisco Bayeu made a sketch of a fresco for the ceiling of the Queen's boudoir in the Palacio Real de Madrid that was never made. The painting seems to want to represent the Spanish monarchy in an allegorical way, this, due to the similarities seems to be inspired by Hispania in a martial way with Corinthian helmet and armor. She appears being covered by a mantle by the angels. Religion appears to the right of the allegory and among others appear "Authority, the Virtues of Prudence, Justice, Fortitude and Temperance, as well as Nobility, Constancy, Dominion, Honor, Prize, Abundance, Merit, Time or History".

=== Allegory of Spain and England victorious over Napoleon ===
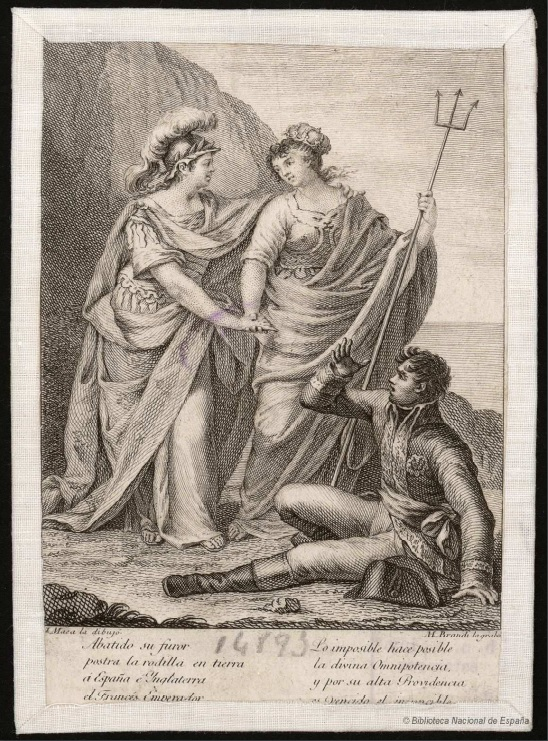
Allegory of Spain and England victorious over Napoleon, engraving by Mariano Brandi after a drawing by José Maea.

Hispania appears martial, Britannia armed with her trident, although she wears a crown very similar to the Crown of Saint Edward instead of her traditional Corinthian helmet. Hispania shows gratitude to Britannia while Napoleon is on the ground defeated and begging for mercy.

Due to the policy of Manuel Godoy, Spain decided to ally itself with revolutionary France, which led to the defeat of the Franco-Spanish fleet in Trafalgar. Shortly afterwards, under the guise of invading Portugal and having to cross Spain, Napoleon occupied Spain and overthrew its king, Charles IV crowning his brother Joseph Bonaparte in its place. Although many welcomed the French liberal reforms, the majority of the population would not forgive such betrayal, taking up arms against the French. This made Spain an ally of its old enemy, Great Britain until in 1814 they managed to expel the Napoleonic army from the country.

=== Other paintings and engravings ===
- Parnassus of the great men of Spain, fresco painted on the vault of one of the rooms of the Royal Palace of Madrid by Juan Antonio de Ribera where Hispania appears rewarding all the great heroes and artists of Spain throughout its history.
- Spain crowning the effigy of the Marquis of La Romana in the presence of Valencia drawing by Vicente López Portaña.
- Portrait of Ferdinand VI with allegories of Spain and America.
- La Antigua y la Nueva España, in 1820 representing Spain and Mexico before their independence.
- Spain presents the arts and sciences to Ferdinand VII.
- Constant Merit Award.
- Allegories of the King, Religion and the Country.
- Allegory of Ferdinand VII, Spain appears seated on the left armed with a spear.
- Patriotic loan.

== Hispania in satirical magazines ==
In the 19th century, Spain was represented allegorically in various humorous publications. Especially famous were the magazines La Flaca and Don Quijote, which often represented a Spain afflicted by the pressing problems of the country in that century. Although many caricatures seem to be linked to the allegory of Hispania or the allegory of the Republic, some do not seem to have any of the attributes used in art —except that they are female figures— such as the laurel wreath, the mural crown, the hispanic lion, a spear or a corinthian helmet.

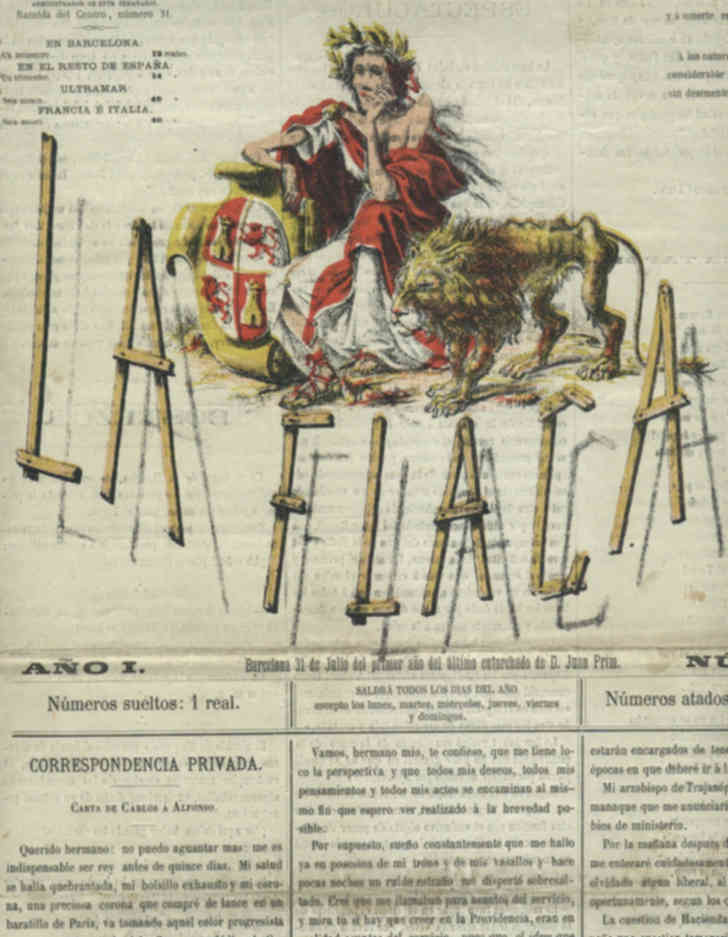
Cover of La Flaca with a humorous representation of a skinny Spain in keeping with the title of the publication.

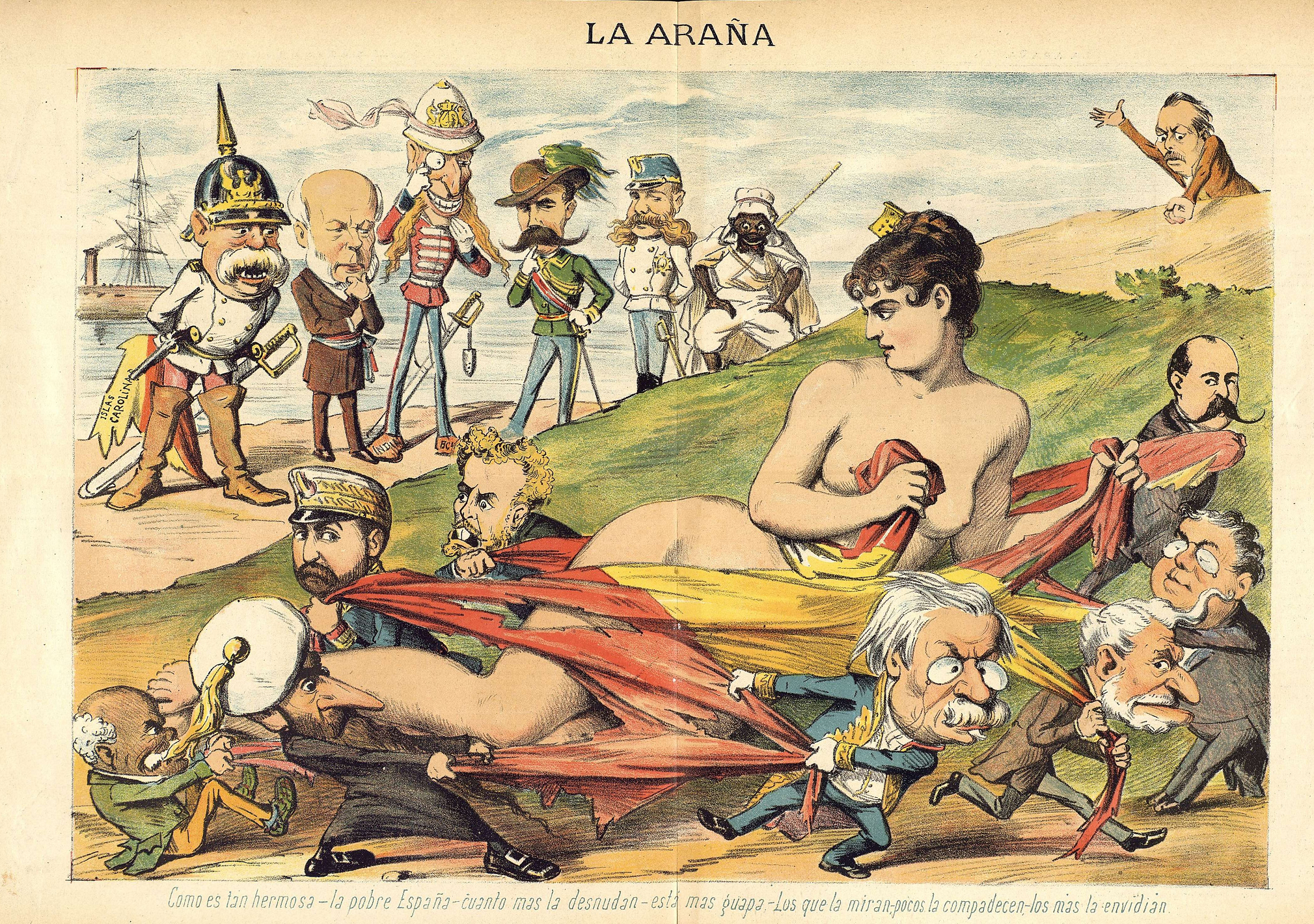
The dress of Spain being destroyed by its internal problems before the concupiscent gaze of the European powers.

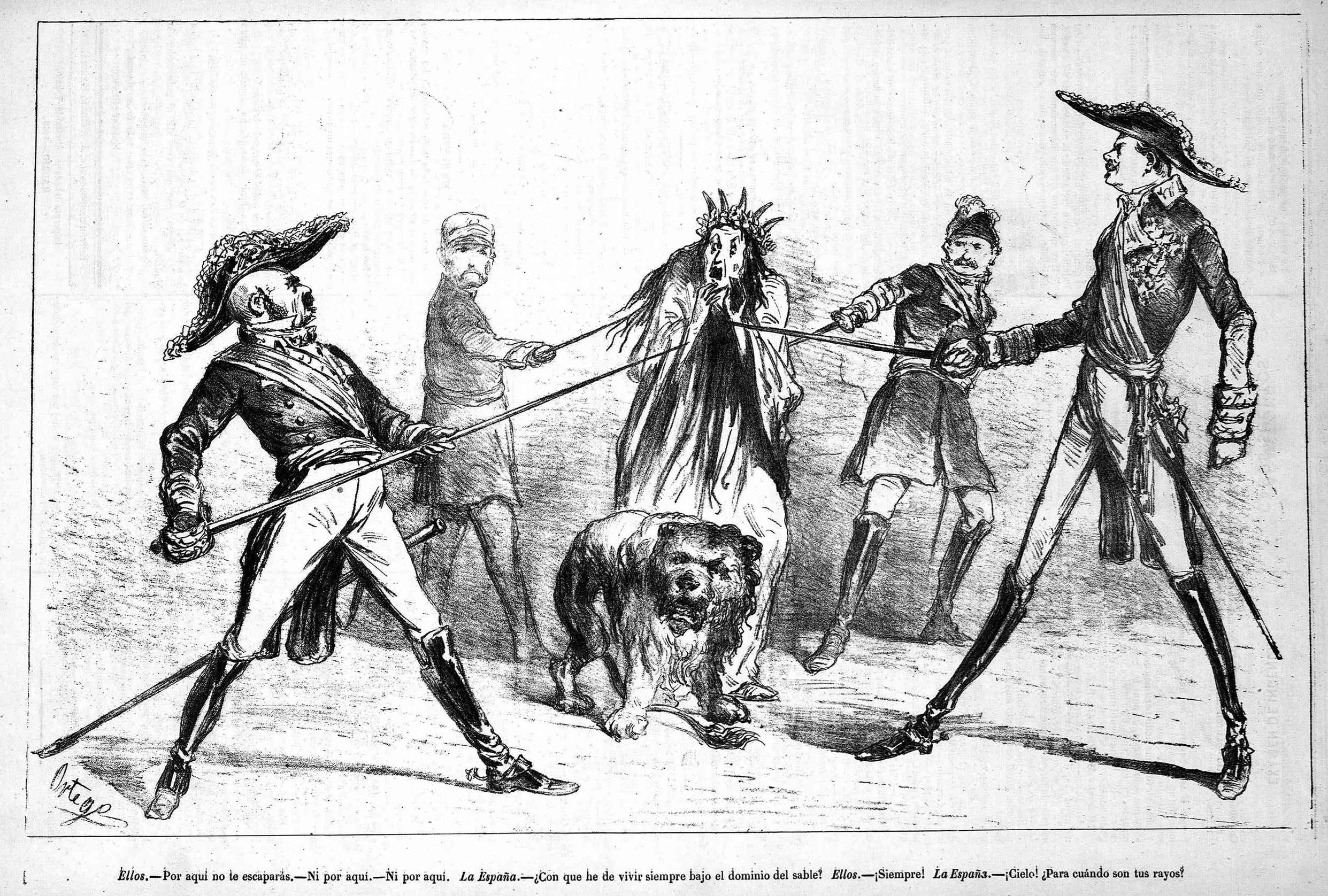
Spain cornered.

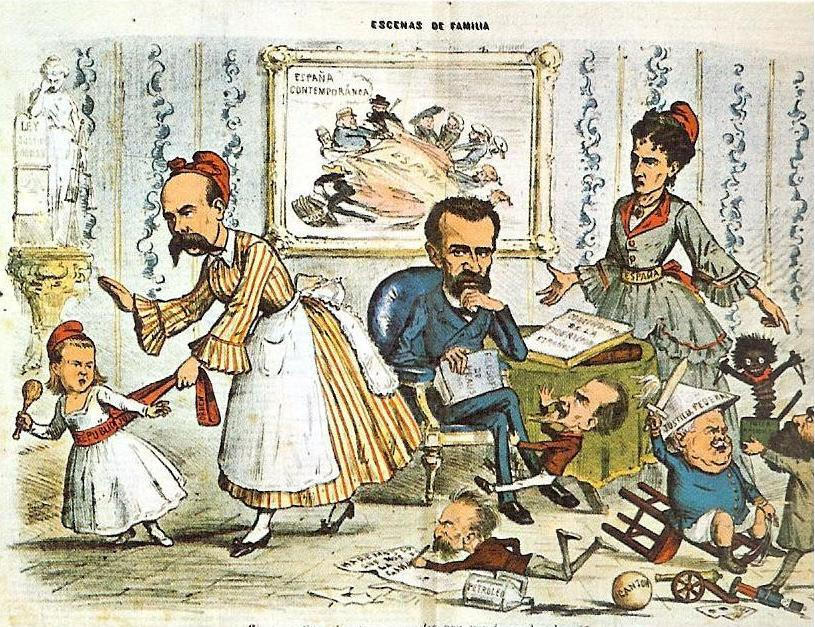
Caricature of La Flaca where Spain appears with a Phrygian cap, outraged by the attitude of Salmerón and Castelar.

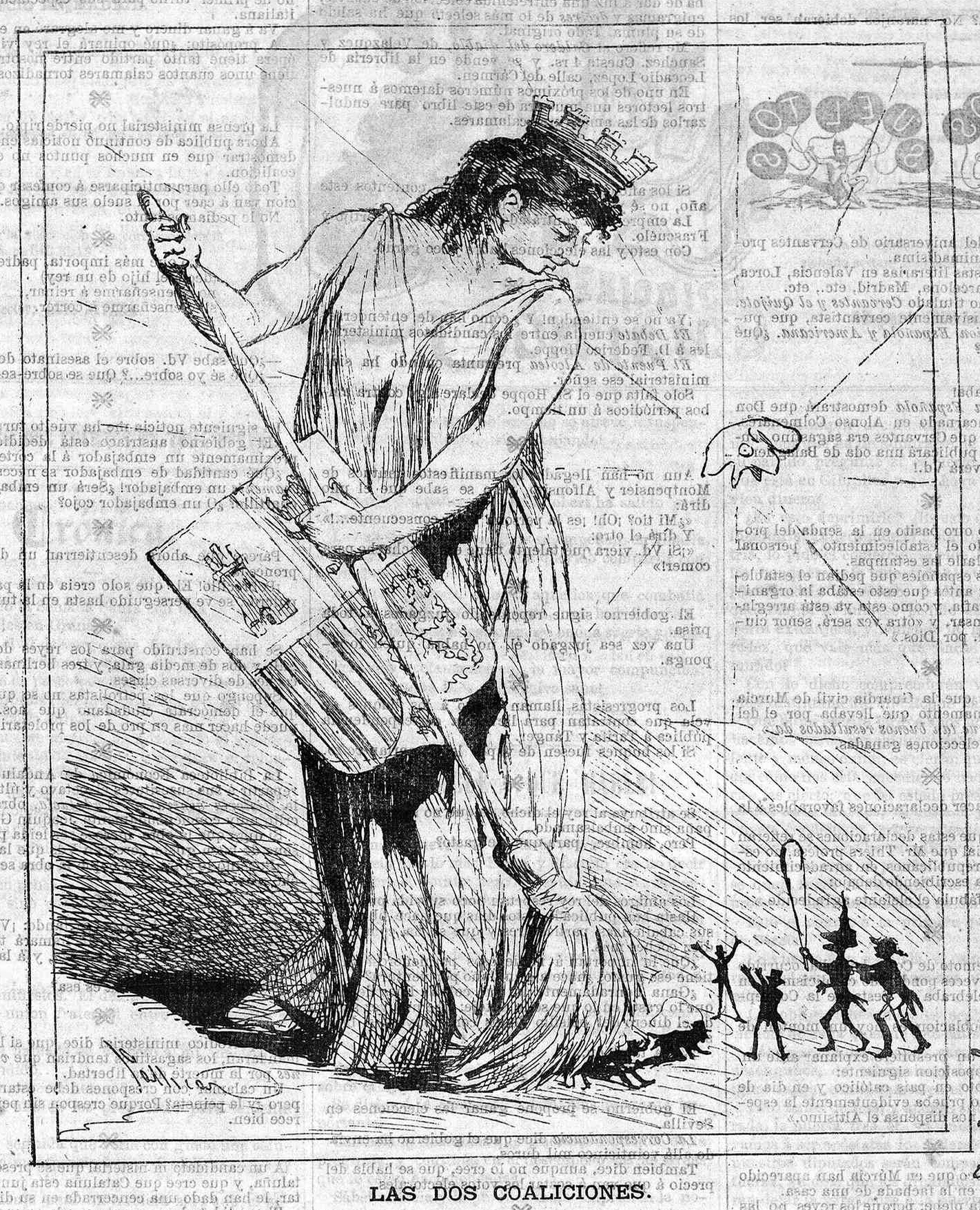
The two coalitions.

== Other uses ==
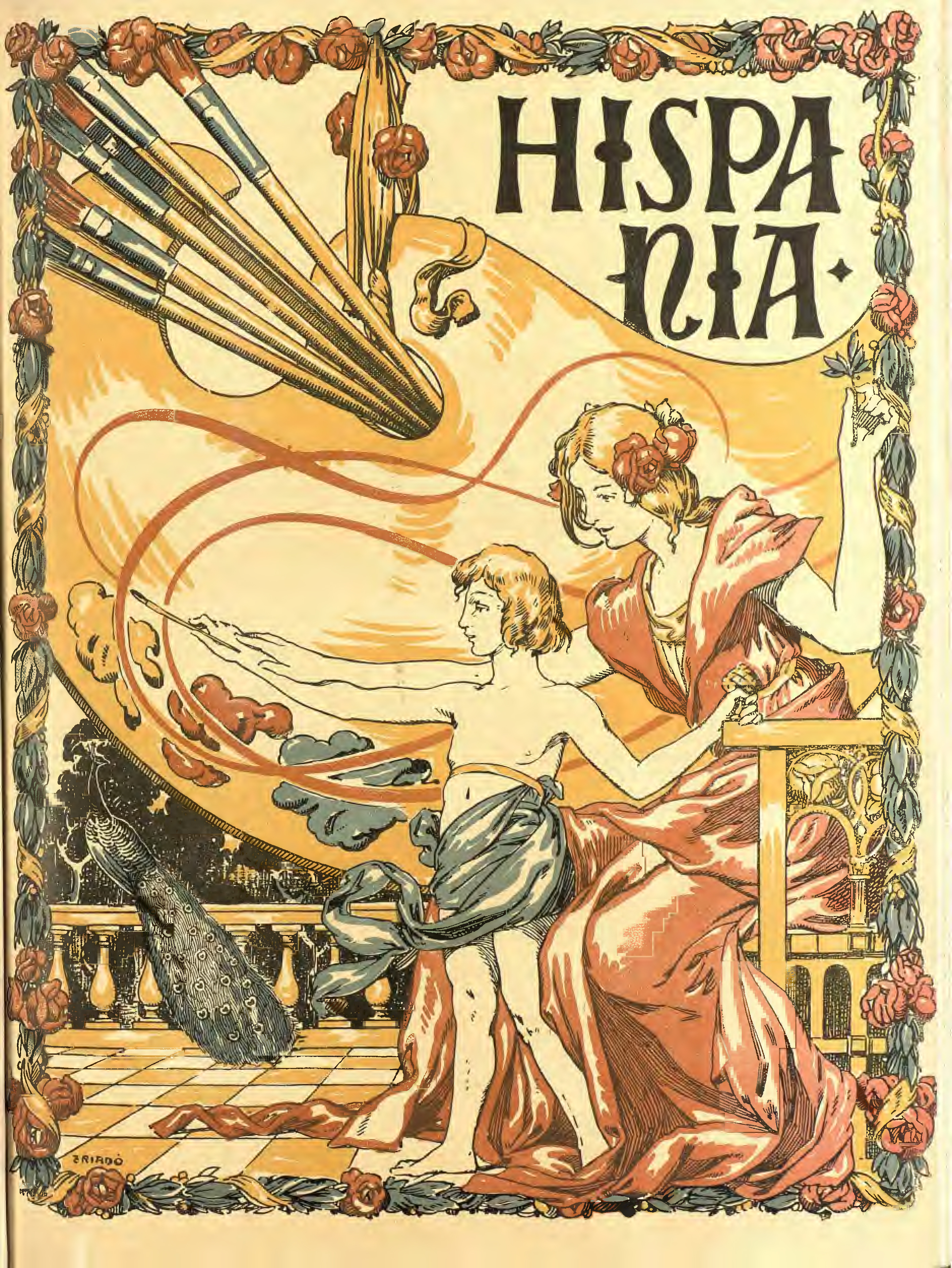
Cover of number 57 of the magazine Hispania.

Hispania has also been used to name publications, sports clubs or asteroids and its logo image for television programs or clothing brands. Some examples are the following:

- The magazine Hispania published in Barcelona between 1899 and 1903.
- The asteroid 804 Hispania.

== Bibliography ==
- Reyero, Carlos (2010). Alegoría, nación y libertad : el Olimpo constitucional de 1812. Tres Cantos, Madrid: Siglo XXI de España Editores. ISBN 978-84-323-1408-7.
- Álvarez Burgos, F.(1982). Catálogo General de la Moneda Hispánica. Madrid.
- Aledón, José María (2001). Historia de la Peseta. Madrid.
