= Religion saved by Spain =

Painting by Titian

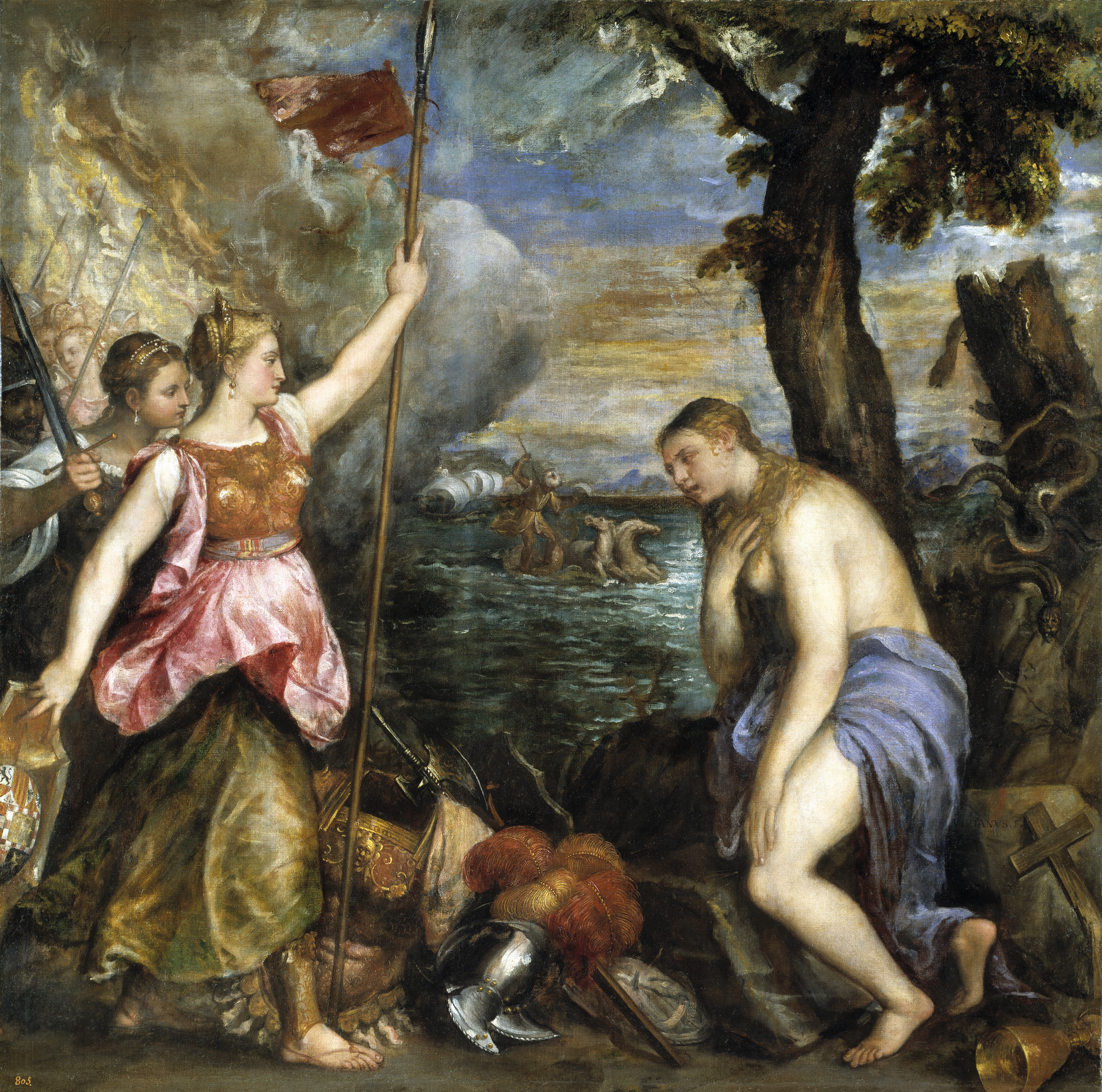
- Artist: Titian
- Year: 1572–1575
- Medium: Oil on canvas
- Dimensions: 168.5 cm × 168.5 cm (66.3 in × 66.3 in)
- Location: Museo del Prado; Madrid

Religion saved by Spain is an oil on canvas painting produced between 1572 and 1575 by Titian, an Italian master of the Venetian school, commemorating the Battle of Lepanto in 1571. It is one of his later works, and is considered to be an outstanding piece. Other titles are Spain succoring Religion or Religion assisted by Spain.

It was sent to Philip II of Spain in 1576, remained in the Spanish Royal Collection subsequently, and had been in the Prado Museum since the 19th century.

== Painting ==
Spain rescues Religion is an allegory mixed with political propaganda, portraying Spain as a woman in a dramatic landscape, with a shield in her right hand and a spear with the flag of Victory on it in her left hand. Moreover, both her left and right hand fingers make a symbolic V ("victory") gesture. The shield bears the coat of arms of Philip II, King of Spain from 1556 to 1598.

Behind her is a woman carrying a sword, representing Justice. The Turkish threat is shown by a man, perhaps Poseidon, wearing a turban in a chariot with two horses on the sea. The person symbolizing the Christian religion is depicted as a woman, to the right, falling on her knees, covered with a blue drapery, threatened not only by the Turks but also by Protestantism, represented by snakes. At the far left behind Justice is the head of man, perhaps Philip's half-brother Juan of Austria, commander of the Christian fleet at the Battle of Lepanto.

== History ==
In the Battle of Lepanto the troops of the Holy League defeated the Ottoman navy of Selim II (1524–1574). This Holy League was formed by an alliance of Spain, Venice and the Papal States. The battle halted the expansion of the Ottoman Empire further in Europe.

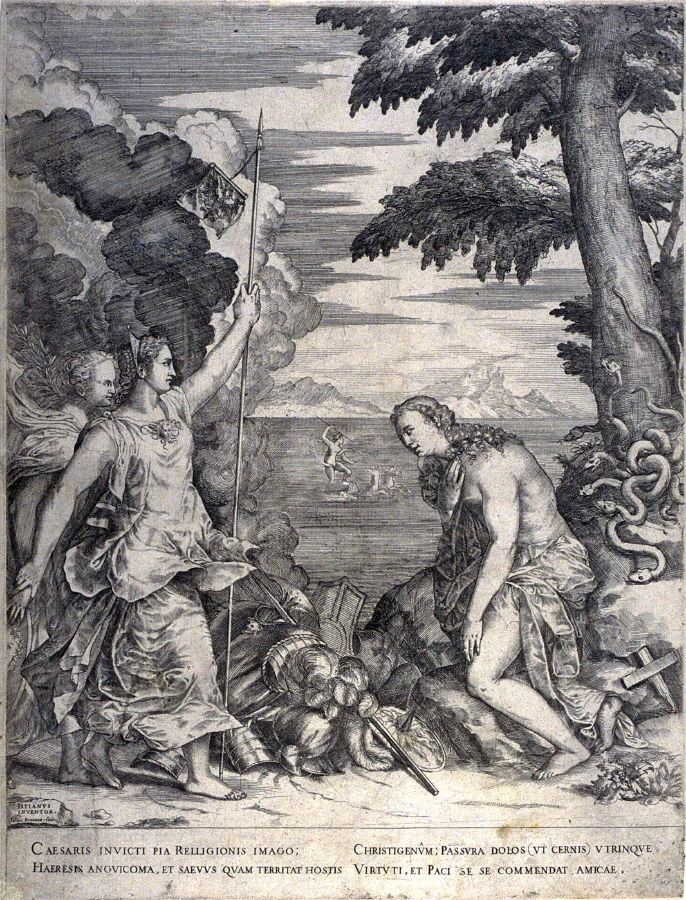
Giulio Fontana, after Titian: Religion saved by the Empire

The composition echoes a painting commenced by Titian for Alfonso d'Este, Duke of Ferrara (1486–1534), and left unfinished on the Duke's death; it was seen in Titian's studio in 1568 by Giorgio Vasari, still unfinished. It depicted a male nude bowing to Minerva and another woman with a laurel branch representing Peace, with Amphitrite in a chariot in the sea. It was modified and sent to Holy Roman Emperor Maximilian II before November 1568, to show a figure representing the Holy Roman Empire defending an allegorical figure representing Religion. It was engraved by Giulio Fontana c.1568, but the original oil painting is now lost.

== See also ==
- List of works by Titian
