= Church fan =

Type of hand fan

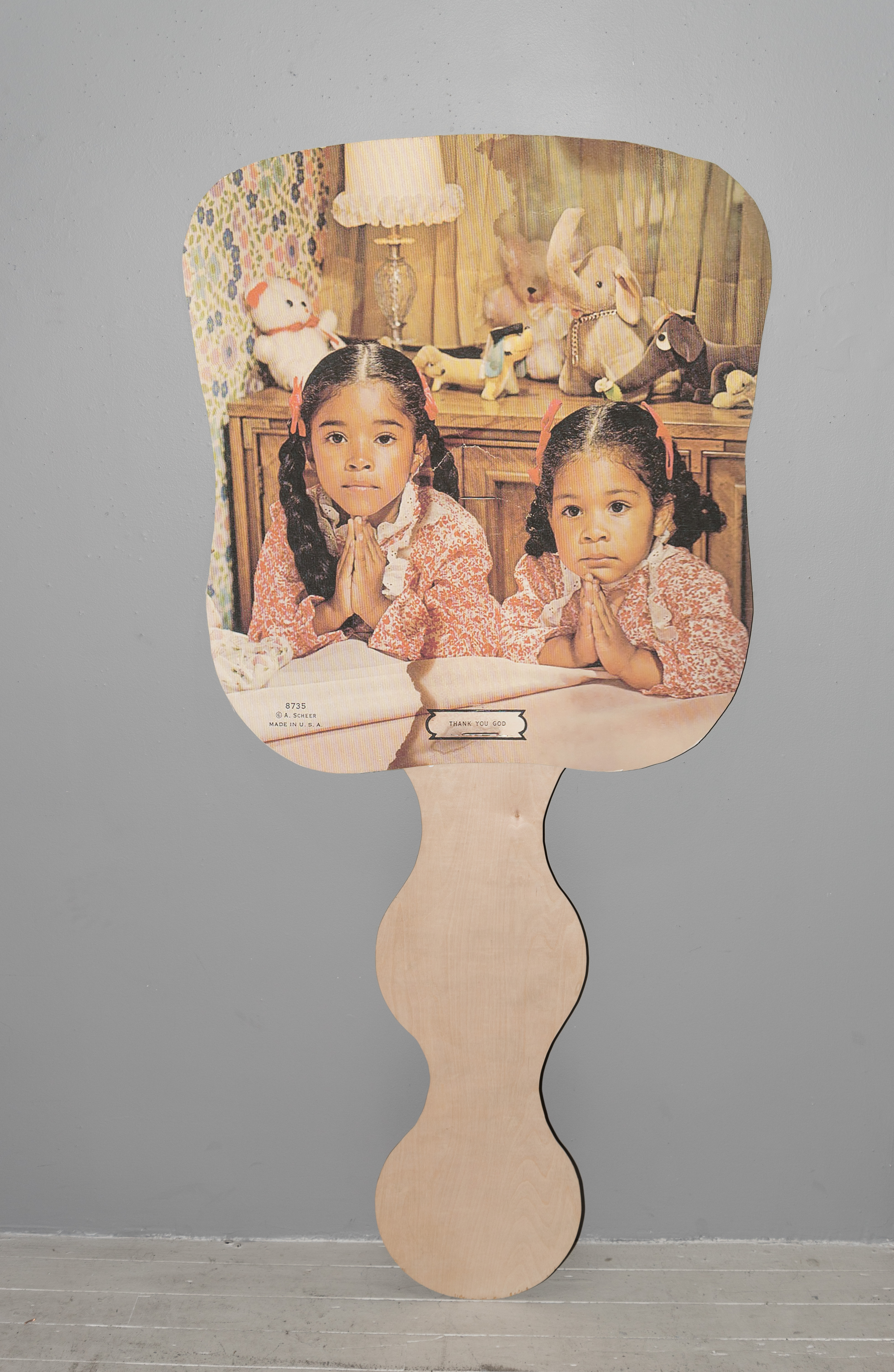
Church fan depicting two African-American girls praying

A church fan is a term used mainly in the United States for a hand fan used within a Christian church building to cool oneself off. The fan typically has a wooden handle and a fan blade made of hard stock paper (i.e. card-stock, 2-ply), often with a staple adjoining the two materials.

== History ==
Modern air-conditioning became widely available in America during the 1950s. However, many churches (primarily Black congregations) were unable to afford the cooling machines for their church buildings. In addition to their function of cooling, the paper blade of the fans would be used for printed illustrations with a variety of subject matter, from Jesus Christ to notable people within the local church community. The reverse side of the fan often served as space for community advertisements, especially advertising for local funeral homes.

== Contemporary use ==
With the spread of modern air-conditioning units within church buildings, church fans have become less popular. However, many churches still supply hand fans for their members.
